= Chlodwig, Landgrave of Hesse-Philippsthal-Barchfeld =

Landgrave of Hesse

Chlodwig
- Landgrave of Hesse-Philippsthal-Barchfeld
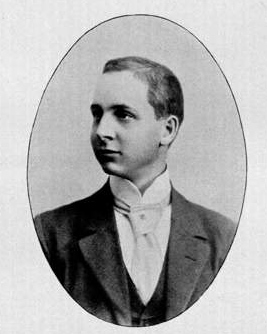
- Chlodwig in 1899
- Born: 30 July 1876; Burgsteinfurt
- Died: 17 November 1954 (aged 78); Bad Hersfeld
- Spouse: Princess Caroline of Solms-Hohensolms-Lich (m. 1904)
- Issue: Wilhelm, Hereditary Prince of Hesse-Philippsthal-Barchfeld; Prince Ernst Ludwig; Princess Irene; Prince Alexander Friedrich; Princess Viktoria Cäcilie
- House: House of Hesse
- Father: Prince William of Hesse-Philippsthal-Barchfeld
- Mother: Princess Juliane of Bentheim and Steinfurt

Chlodwig, Landgrave of Hesse-Philippsthal-Barchfeld (Chlodwig Alexis Ernst; 30 July 1876 – 17 November 1954) was an officer in the Prussian Army and head of the Hesse-Philippsthal line of the House of Hesse.

As head of the house he was styled His Highness the Landgrave of Hesse-Philippsthal-Barchfeld.

== Early life ==
Landgrave Chlodwig, the seventh of ten children of Prince William of Hesse-Philippsthal-Barchfeld, was born at Burgsteinfurt. He was the only surviving son from his father's second marriage with Princess Juliane of Bentheim and Steinfurt; his only surviving full sibling, Princess Bertha, was married to Leopold IV, Prince of Lippe.

Although the third son Landgrave Chlodwig became heir to the headship of the House of Hesse-Philippsthal-Barchfeld upon the death of his uncle in 1905 due to his elder half brothers Prince Friedrich Wilhelm and Prince Carl Wilhelm von Ardeck's exclusion from the succession on account of their parents morganatic marriage.

Landgrave Chlodwig served in the Prussian Army reaching the rank of lieutenant colonel. On 26 May 1904 he married Princess Caroline of Solms-Hohensolms-Lich, the daughter of Hermann of Solms-Hohensolms-Lich and Countess Agnes of Stolberg-Wernigerode, in her home town of Lich. The couple had five children: Wilhelm Ernst Alexis Hermann (1905-1942) who married Princess Marianne of Prussia, Ernst Ludwig (1906-1934), Irene (1907-1980), Alexander Friedrich (1911-1939) and Viktoria Cäcilie (1914-1998).

== Landgrave ==
On 16 August 1905, Chlodwig succeeded his uncle Landgrave Alexis as head of the House of Hesse-Philippsthal-Barchfeld, giving him a seat in the House of Lords of Prussia. On 22 December 1925 he inherited the assets and headship of the House of Hesse-Philippsthal following the death of Landgrave Ernst.

In the early 1930s three of Landgrave Chlodwig's children (Wilhelm, Alexander Friedrich and Viktoria Cäcilie) joined the Nazi party. His third son Prince Alexander Friedrich, who suffered from epilepsy, was sterilised by the Nazis on 27 September 1938, he died a year later. The landgrave's eldest son Prince Wilhelm, an SS-Hauptsturmführer, was killed in action during World War II.

Landgrave Chlodwig died aged 78 in Bad Hersfeld, he was survived by his wife and daughters, his three sons having predeceased him. His grandson Wilhelm succeeded him as head of the House of Hesse-Philippsthal.

== Honours ==
- Knight of the House Order of the Golden Lion of Hesse, 21 December 1898
- Grand Cross of the Order of Ludwig of Hesse, 14 May 1910
- Grand Cross of the Princely House Order of Lippe
- Grand Cross of the Order of the Red Eagle of Prussia
- Knight of the Order of St. John of Prussia
- Grand Cross of the Ducal Saxe-Ernestine House Order
- Grand Cross of the Princely House Order of Schaumburg-Lippe
- Cross of Merit of Waldeck and Pyrmont

== Ancestry ==
Ancestors of Chlodwig, Landgrave of Hesse-Philippsthal-Barchfeld

16. William, Landgrave of Hesse-Philippsthal-Barchfeld
8. Adolph, Landgrave of Hesse-Philippsthal-Barchfeld
17. Princess Charlotte Wilhelmine of Anhalt-Bernburg-Schaumburg-Hoym
4. Charles, Landgrave of Hesse-Philippsthal-Barchfeld
18. Anton Ulrich, Duke of Saxe-Meiningen
9. Princess Louise of Saxe-Meiningen
19. Princess Charlotte Amalie of Hesse-Philippsthal
2. Prince William of Hesse-Philippsthal-Barchfeld
20. Charles Paul Ernest, Count of Bentheim-Steinfurt
10. Louis William Geldricus Ernest, Prince of Bentheim and Steinfurt
21. Princess Sophie Charlotte of Nassau-Siegen
5. Princess Sophie of Bentheim and Steinfurt
22. Friedrich, Duke of Schleswig-Holstein-Glücksburg
11. Princess Juliane Wilhelmine of Schleswig-Holstein-Glücksburg
23. Countess Auguste of Lippe-Detmold
1. Chlodwig, Landgrave of Hesse-Philippsthal-Barchfeld
24. Louis William Geldricus Ernest, Prince of Bentheim and Steinfurt (= 10)
12. Alexius, Prince of Bentheim and Steinfurt
25. Princess Juliane Wilhelmine of Schleswig-Holstein-Glücksburg (= 11)
6. Ludwig Wilhelm, Prince of Bentheim and Steinfurt
26. Wilhelm, Prince of Solms-Braunfels
13. Countess Wilhelmine of Solms-Braunfels
27. Wild- and Rhinegravine Auguste of Grumbach
3. Princess Juliane of Bentheim and Steinfurt
28. Adolph, Landgrave of Hesse-Philippsthal-Barchfeld (= 8)
14. Charles, Landgrave of Hesse-Philippsthal-Barchfeld (= 4)
29. Princess Louise of Saxe-Meiningen (= 9)
7. Princess Bertha of Hesse-Philippsthal-Barchfeld
30. Frederick Louis, Prince of Hohenlohe-Ingelfingen
15. Princess Auguste of Hohenlohe-Ingelfingen
31. Countess Marianne von Hoym, Heiress of Slawentzitz

Chlodwig, Landgrave of Hesse-Philippsthal-Barchfeld House of Hesse Born: 30 July 1876 Died: 17 November 1954
Titles in pretence
| Preceded by Alexis | — TITULAR — Landgrave of Hesse-Philippsthal-Barchfeld; 16 August 1905 – 17 November 1954; Reason for succession failure: Landgraviate annexed by Prussia in 1866 | Succeeded by Wilhelm |
| Preceded by Ernst | — TITULAR — Landgrave of Hesse-Philippsthal; 22 December 1925 – 17 November 1954; Reason for succession failure: Landgraviate annexed by Prussia in 1866 | Succeeded by Wilhelm |
