= Prince Christian of Hesse-Philippsthal-Barchfeld =

German noble (1887–1971)

Prince Christian
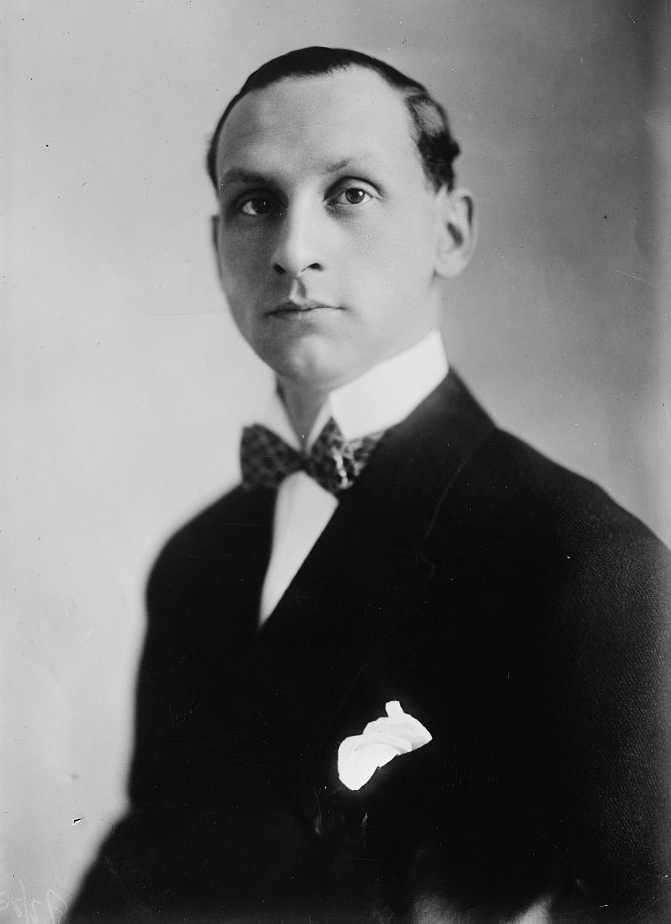
- Born: 16 June 1887; Louisenlund Castle
- Died: 19 October 1971 (aged 84); Geneva
- Spouse: Elizabeth Reid Rogers (m. 1915; died 1957) Ann Pearl Everett (m. 1958)
- Issue: Princess Elisabeth Auguste; Prince Richard Christian; Prince Waldemar; Princess Marie Louise
- House: House of Hesse
- Father: Prince William of Hesse-Philippsthal-Barchfeld
- Mother: Princess Auguste of Schleswig-Holstein-Sonderburg-Glücksburg

Prince Christian of Hesse-Philippsthal-Barchfeld (Christian Ludwig Friedrich Adolf Alexis Wilhelm Ferdinand; 16 June 1887 – 19 October 1971) was a member of the House of Hesse-Philippsthal-Barchfeld and a German naval officer until he resigned his commission during the First World War in protest at Germany's policy of unrestricted submarine warfare.

As a member of the House of Hesse, he was styled His Highness Prince Christian of Hesse-Philippsthal-Barchfeld. To distinguish between the various branches of the house, the designation -Philippsthal-Barchfeld was sometimes added to the end of the princely title.

== Early life ==
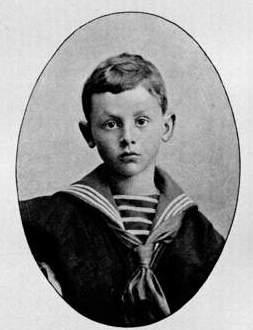
Prince Christian c. 1899

Prince Christian, the youngest of Prince Wilhelm of Hesse's ten children, was born at Louisenlund Castle in Güby, Schleswig-Holstein. He was the only child from his father's fourth marriage with Princess Auguste of Schleswig-Holstein-Sonderburg-Glücksburg, the eldest daughter of Duke Friedrich. Prince Christian was closely related to the British, Danish, Greek and Russian royal families through his mother, who was a first cousin of Queen Alexandra, King Frederik VIII, King George I and Empress Maria Feodorovna. His half-sister Princess Bertha was married to Leopold IV, Prince of Lippe.

In 1905, Prince Christian's elder half brother Prince Chlodwig inherited the family's wealth and assets when he succeeded their uncle Landgrave Alexis as head of the House of Hesse-Philippsthal-Barchfeld because the children of their father's first morganatic marriage, the Princes and Princesses von Ardeck, were excluded from the succession. As a younger son, Prince Christian was not particularly wealthy and had to live off the money that his family granted him.

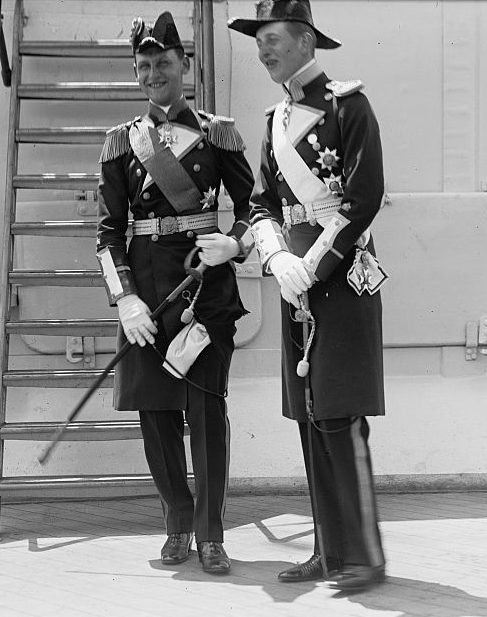
Prince Christian (on the left) during SMS Stettin's 1912 visit to the United States

Prince Christian joined the Imperial German Navy on 20 March 1905. In the summer of 1912, he was a Lieutenant Commander on the SMS Stettin when the ship made an official visit to the United States as part of a squadron, commanded by Admiral Hubert von Rebeur-Paschwitz.

During the First World War, Prince Christian wrote an open letter to Emperor Wilhelm II that criticised Germany's campaign of unrestricted submarine warfare. He then resigned his commission in protest.

== First marriage ==
Prince Christian was a relative of Emperor Nicholas II of Russia, their mothers being first cousins, and before the outbreak of the war, a marriage between the prince and the Emperor's oldest daughter Grand Duchess Olga Nikolaevna had been speculated on, the match being seen as a way to increase German influence in Russia. However, nothing came of that, and in December 1914, Prince Christian's engagement with Elizabeth Reid Rogers, the daughter of prominent United States lawyer Richard Reid Rogers, was announced. The couple had first met about a year earlier at a ball in Cairo after which her family travelled to Berlin for an extended stay and enabled the prince to renew his courtship. Unlike other American society girls who had married European royalty and nobility in the 19th and 20th centuries, Prince Christian's fiancée was not particularly wealthy but was born of an influential father.

Prince Christian and Elizabeth were married on 14 January 1915 at the Holy Trinity Church in Berlin. As Elizabeth was not of equal birth, the marriage was morganatic and so she and any future children would be unable to share Prince Christian's title and rank. To compensate, on the day of the wedding Prince Christian's kinsman the reigning Grand Duke of Hesse bestowed the title Baroness von Barchfeld on Elizabeth.

Prince Christian and Elizabeth went on to have four children: Elisabeth Auguste (1915–2003), married in 1949 with Jacques Olivgetti (div. in 1956); Richard Christian (1917–1985), married in 1953 with Maria Lafontaine; Waldemar (1919–2002), married in 1952 with Ellen Hamilton (two sons : Alexander, born in 1956, and Heinrich, born in 1963) and Marie Louise Olga (1921–1999), married in 1952 with Michel Savich. With the permission of his brother Landgrave Chlodwig, on 14 November 1921 it was declared that Prince Christian's wife and children were permitted to title themselves Prinz/Prinzessin von Hessen-Philippsthal-Barchfeld (Prince/Princess of Hesse-Philippsthal-Barchfeld).

== Later life ==
After the war, Prince Christian and his family lived for a time in Switzerland and the United States before they acquired a villa in Cannes. The prince was close to the British royal family both before and after the First World War. In 1925, after attending the funeral of his cousin Queen Alexandra, he became the first person of German origin to dine after the war with King George V and Queen Mary at Buckingham Palace.

With Adolf Hitler's rise to power in Germany, a number of Prince Christian's Hessian relatives, including various nephews and nieces, joined the Nazi Party. However, the prince and his family were not among them, and in 1941, the Nazis stripped Prince Christian, his wife and their children of their German citizenship although no reason was given in the announcement. Prince Christian would later acquire Swiss nationality.

On 2 February 1957, Prince Christian's wife, Elizabeth, died at Cannes. He was married for a second time in Cannes on 25 June 1958 to a fellow widow, Ann Pearl Field, née Everett (1906-1972), the civil wedding having taken place 15 days earlier in Geneva. His second marriage was childless.

Prince Christian spent his last years travelling and visited his second wife's native Australia in 1962. He died at 84 while he was holidaying with his wife in Geneva.

== Honours ==
- Knight of the House Order of the Golden Lion of Hesse
- Grand Cross of the Princely House Order of Lippe

== Ancestry ==
Ancestors of Prince Christian of Hesse-Philippsthal-Barchfeld

16. William, Landgrave of Hesse-Philippsthal-Barchfeld
8. Adolph, Landgrave of Hesse-Philippsthal-Barchfeld
17. Princess Charlotte Wilhelmine of Anhalt-Bernburg-Schaumburg-Hoym
4. Charles, Landgrave of Hesse-Philippsthal-Barchfeld
18. Anton Ulrich, Duke of Saxe-Meiningen
9. Princess Louise of Saxe-Meiningen
19. Princess Charlotte Amalie of Hesse-Philippsthal
2. Prince William of Hesse-Philippsthal-Barchfeld
20. Charles Paul Ernest, Count of Bentheim-Steinfurt
10. Louis William Geldricus Ernest, Prince of Bentheim and Steinfurt
21. Princess Charlotte Sophie of Nassau-Siegen
5. Princess Sophie of Bentheim and Steinfurt
22. Friedrich, Duke of Schleswig-Holstein-Sonderburg-Glücksburg
11. Princess Juliane Wilhelmine of Schleswig-Holstein-Sonderburg-Glücksburg
23. Countess Henriette Auguste of Lippe-Detmold
1. Prince Christian of Hesse-Philippsthal-Barchfeld
24. Friedrich Karl Ludwig, Duke of Schleswig-Holstein-Sonderburg-Beck
12. Friedrich Wilhelm, Duke of Schleswig-Holstein-Sonderburg-Glücksburg
25. Countess Friederike of Schlieben
6. Friedrich, Duke of Schleswig-Holstein-Sonderburg-Glücksburg
26. Prince Charles of Hesse-Kassel
13. Princess Louise Caroline of Hesse-Kassel
27. Princess Louise of Denmark
3. Princess Auguste of Schleswig-Holstein-Sonderburg-Glücksburg
28. Philip II, Count of Schaumburg-Lippe
14. George William, Prince of Schaumburg-Lippe
29. Princess Juliane of Hesse-Philippsthal
7. Princess Adelheid of Schaumburg-Lippe
30. George I, Prince of Waldeck and Pyrmont
15. Princess Ida of Waldeck and Pyrmont
31. Princess Auguste of Schwarzburg-Sondershausen
