= Alexis, Landgrave of Hesse-Philippsthal-Barchfeld =

Alexis
- Landgrave of Hesse-Philippsthal-Barchfeld
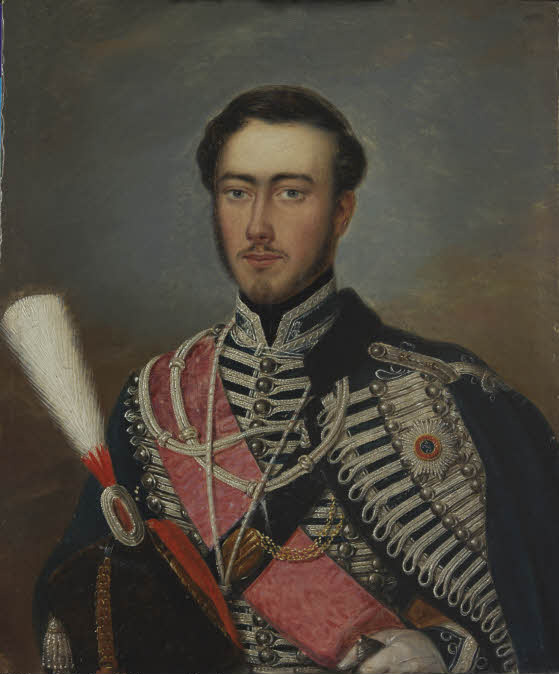
- Portrait by an unknown artist, c. 1850–1860
- Born: 13 September 1829; Burgsteinfurt
- Died: 16 August 1905 (aged 75); Herleshausen
- Spouse: Princess Louise of Prussia (m. 1854; div. 1861)
- House: Hesse
- Father: Charles, Landgrave of Hesse-Philippsthal-Barchfeld
- Mother: Princess Sophie of Bentheim and Steinfurt

Alexis William Ernest Philip of Hesse-Philippsthal-Barchfeld (German: Alexis Wilhelm Ernst von Hessen-Philippsthal-Barchfeld; 13 September 1829 in Burgsteinfurt – 16 August 1905 in Herleshausen) was the last ruling Landgrave of Hesse-Philippsthal-Barchfeld.

== Life ==
Alexis was a son of the Landgrave Charles of Hesse-Philippsthal-Barchfeld (1784–1854) from his second marriage to Sophie (1794–1873), the daughter of Louis William Geldricus Ernest, Prince of Bentheim and Steinfurt. He succeeded his father in 1854 as Landgrave of Hesse-Philippsthal-Barchfeld.

Alexis was a Prussian General of the Cavalry à la suite. From 1866, he was a member of the Prussian House of Lords and a Knight of the Prussian Order of the Black Eagle.

Prussia annexed the Electorate of Hesse, including Hesse-Philippsthal-Barchfeld, in 1866. From 1880, Alexis and Ernest of Hesse-Philippsthal together received, as heirs of the Landgraves of Philippsthal, a pension of 300000Mark from the Electorate of Hesse Trust Fund. They were also given three castles: the City Castle in Hanau, Rotenburg Castle and Schönfeld Castle in Kassel.

On 17 June 1854, Alexis married at Charlottenburg Palace to Princess Louise of Prussia (1829–1901), the elder daughter of Prince Charles of Prussia and his wife, Princess Marie of Saxe-Weimar-Eisenach. The marriage remained childless and ended with a divorce on 6 March 1861.

== Death ==
Wilhelm died on 16 August 1905 in Herleshausen, Hesse, Germany. He was succeeded as titular Landgrave of Hesse-Philippsthal-Barchfeld by his nephew Chlodwig (1876–1954), the son of his brother William (1831–1890).

== Ancestors ==
Ancestors of Alexis, Landgrave of Hesse-Philippsthal-Barchfeld

8. William, Landgrave of Hesse-Philippsthal-Barchfeld
4. Adolph, Landgrave of Hesse-Philippsthal-Barchfeld
9. Charlotte Wilhelmine of Anhalt-Bernburg-Schaumburg-Hoym
2. Charles, Landgrave of Hesse-Philippsthal-Barchfeld
10. Anton Ulrich, Duke of Saxe-Meiningen
5. Princess Louise of Saxe-Meiningen
11. Charlotte Amalie of Hesse-Philippsthal
1. Alexis, Landgrave of Hesse-Philippsthal-Barchfeld
12. Charles Paul Ernest, Count of Bentheim-Steinfurt
6. Louis William Geldricus Ernest of Bentheim and Steinfurt
13. Charlotte Sophie of Nassau-Siegen
3. Sophie of Bentheim-Steinfurt
14. Frederick of Schleswig-Holstein-Sonderburg-Glücksburg
7. Juliane Wilhelmine of Schleswig-Holstein-Glücksburg
15. Henriette Auguste of Lippe-Detmold

Alexis, Landgrave of Hesse-Philippsthal-Barchfeld House of Hesse Born: 13 September 1829 Died: 16 August 1905
German nobility
Preceded by Charles	Landgrave of Hesse-Philippsthal-Barchfeld; 1854–1866	Hesse-Kassel annexed by Prussia
Titles in pretence
Loss of title Hesse-Kassel annexed by Prussia	— TITULAR — Landgrave of Hesse-Philippsthal-Barchfeld; 1866–1905	Succeeded by Chlodwig
