= Prince William of Hesse-Philippsthal-Barchfeld =

German counter admiral (1831–1890)

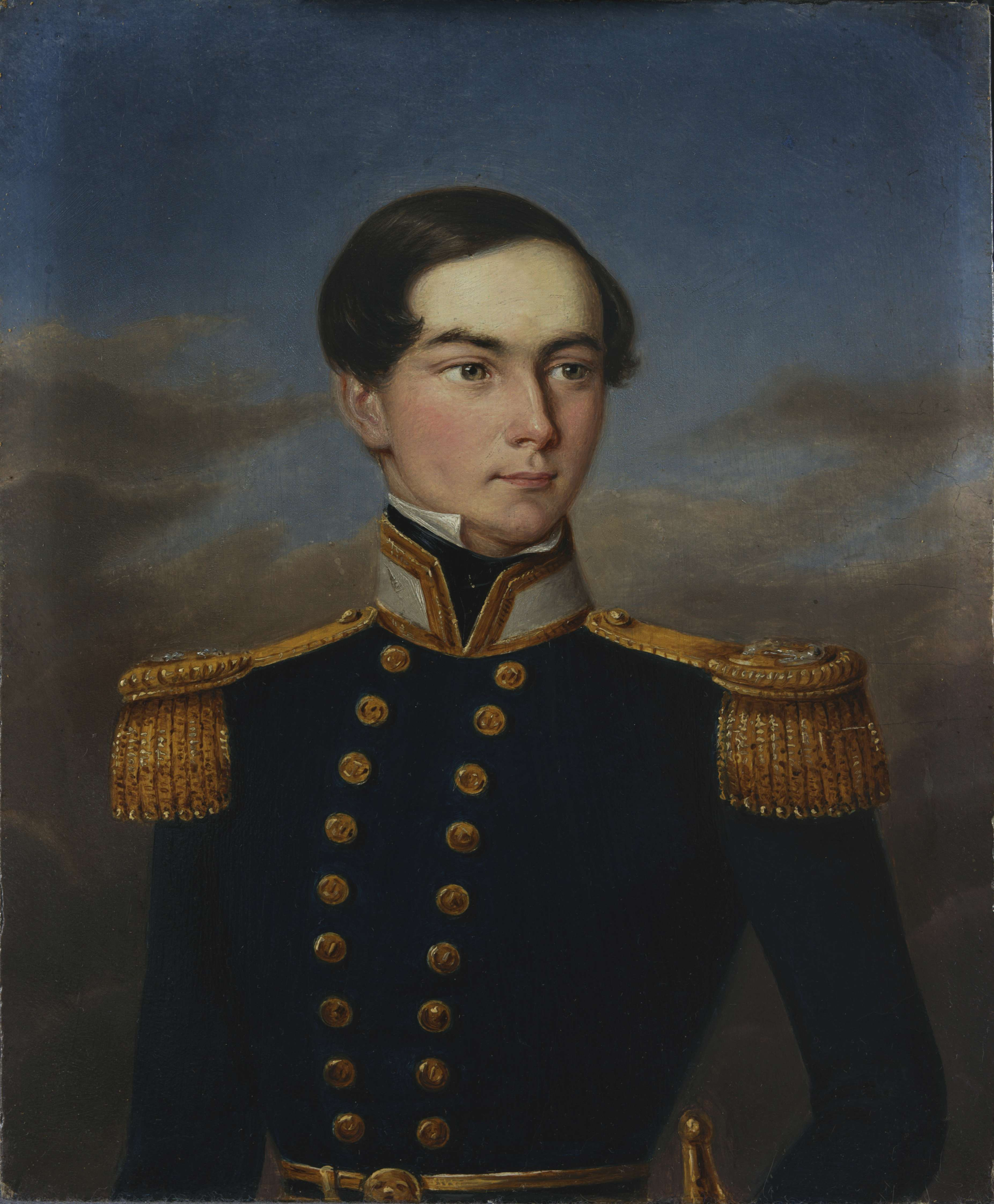
- Portrait, 1850s
- Born: 30 October 1831; Burgsteinfurt
- Died: 17 January 1890 (aged 58); Rotenburg an der Fulda
- Spouse: Princess Maria von Hanau-Hořowitz (m. 1857; div. 1872) Princess Juliane of Bentheim and Steinfurt (m. 1873; died 1878) Princess Adelaide of Bentheim and Steinfurt (m. 1879; died 1880) Princess Augusta of Schleswig-Holstein (m. 1884)
- Issue: Chlodwig, Landgrave of Hesse-Philippsthal-Barchfeld; Prince Christian
Names
- Wilhelm Friedrich Ernst
- House: House of Hesse
- Father: Charles, Landgrave of Hesse-Philippsthal-Barchfeld
- Mother: Sophie of Bentheim and Steinfurt

William of Hesse-Philippsthal-Barchfeld (3 October 1831 – 17 January 1890), was a German prince of the Hesse-Philippsthal-Barchfeld branch of the House of Hesse, and Konteradmiral (counter admiral) of the Prussian and Imperial German Navy.

== Early life ==
Born in Burgsteinfurt, he was the fourth son of Charles, Landgrave of Hesse-Philippsthal-Barchfeld and his second wife Princess Sophie of Bentheim und Steinfurt, daughter of Prince Louis William Geldricus Ernest of Bentheim and Steinfurt.

== Career ==
After serving as cadet and watch officer in the Royal Danish Navy and the British Royal Navy, William joined the Prussian Navy on 29 January 1854 as Lieutenant 1st Class, (captain lieutenant). In the summer of 1854, he served as commanding officer of the corvette Amazone. On 15 October 1854 he was promoted to the rank of Korvettenkapitän (corvette captain). In the winter of 1855/56, he served as Director of the 2nd Division of the Admiralty.

At the same time he took command of the corvette Danzig, a post which he held until November 1856. In this ship he participated in an expedition under the command of Admiral Prince Adalbert to Africa. During the trip, William came into conflict with the Admiral for his punitive actions against the Riffians. Adalbert released William from active service for about a month until the Battle of Tres Forcas on 7 August 1856. After returning home, William was again released from active duty from November 1856 to April 1859. During this time, he was promoted to the rank of Kapitän zur See (captain at sea) on 24 October 1857.

After his return to active service, William took the command of the frigate Thetis from May to September 1859. In April 1860, he asked his release from active service duty, and on 22 March 1864 was appointed Konteradmiral (counter admiral).

During the Franco-Prussian War William was under the service of the General Governor of the German Coastal Lands (Generalgouverneur der deutschen Küstenlande) and General of the Infantry Eduard Vogel von Falckenstein. He sent him to the armed steamer St. George on negotiations with the commander of the French Armed Forces, Vice admiral Martin Fourichon to tell it that shelling the German coast could lead to reprisals in occupied France. Due to the course of the war, the French blockade in the North Sea was canceled after a short time.

On 30 May 1872, William was appointed Konteradmiral à la suite of the Imperial Navy.

== Personal life ==
=== First marriage ===
In Kassel on 27 December 1857, William married firstly Princess Maria of Hanau and Hořowitz (1839–1917), daughter of Frederick William, Elector of Hesse-Kassel and his wife, Gertrude von Hanau; however, the Grand Duke of Hesse-Darmstadt regarded William's marriage as morganatic and refused to recognize their offspring as legitimate Hessian princes. They had five children:

- Frederick William (1858–1902), who married an American heiress, Anne Hollingsworth Price, in 1890. No issue.
- Charles William (1861–1938), who married to Anne Elise Strehlow in 1891. No issue.
- Sophie Auguste Elisabeth (1864–1919), who married Count Ferdinand of Ysenburg-Büdingen-Philippseich in 1886.
- Alice Marie (1867–1868), who died in infancy.
- Caroline Louise (1868–1959), who married Prince Rudolph of Lippe-Biesterfeld (1856-1931), a son of Julius, Count of Lippe-Biesterfeld, in 1889.

William and Maria divorced on 18 March 1872, and she lost the right of use the title of Princess of Hesse. Four years later, on 28 July 1876, she and her surviving children were styled Princes and Princesses of Ardeck by William I.

=== Second marriage ===
In Burgsteinfurt on 16 August 1873, William married, secondly, Princess Juliane of Bentheim and Steinfurt (1842–1878), his niece (daughter of his older half-sister Bertha and her husband, Ludwig Wilhelm, Prince of Bentheim and Steinfurt). Before her death on 29 April 1878 in Burgsteinfurt, they were the parents of four children:

- Bertha Louise Ottilie Auguste Adelheid Marie (1874–1919), who married Leopold IV, Prince of Lippe in 1901.
- Chlodwig Alexis Ernest (1876–1954), who became Landgrave of Hesse-Philippsthal-Barchfeld in 1905 and head of the entire Hesse-Philippsthal branch in 1925.
- Edward Ernest Alexis Hermann Philipp (1878–1879), a twin who died young.
- Julian Charles George William (1878–1878), a twin who died young.

=== Third marriage ===
In Burgsteinfurt on 23 August 1879, William married, thirdly, Princess Adelaide of Bentheim and Steinfurt (1840–1880), the older sister of his second wife. The union, who lasted only five months, was childless, before she died in Bingen on 31 January 1880. Her brother, Alexis, Prince of Bentheim and Steinfurt married Princess Pauline of Waldeck and Pyrmont, the elder sister of Marie, Crown Princess of Württemberg, Emma, Queen of the Netherlands, Helena, Duchess of Albany, Friedrich, Prince of Waldeck and Pyrmont, and Elisabeth, Princess of Erbach-Schönberg.

=== Fourth marriage ===
In Louisenlund Castle on 6 December 1884, William married, fourthly, Princess Auguste of Schleswig-Holstein-Sonderburg-Glücksburg (1844–1932), a daughter of Friedrich, Duke of Schleswig-Holstein-Sonderburg-Glücksburg and niece of King Christian IX of Denmark. They had one son:

- Christian Louis Frederick Adolph Alexis William Ferdinand (1887–1971), who married an American, Elizabeth Reid Rogers, the daughter of Richard Reid Rogers, in 1915. After her death he married the widow Ann Pearl Field (née Everett) in 1958.

He died in Rotenburg an der Fulda on 17 January 1890, aged 59. His widow lived another forty years until her death in Rotenburg an der Fulda on 16 September 1932.

== Honours ==
He received the following orders and decorations:

- Grand Duchy of Hesse: Grand Cross of the Ludwig Order, 26 December 1858
- Electorate of Hesse:
  - Knight of the Golden Lion, 1 March 1857
  - Member of the Wilhelmsorden, 4th Class
- (Saxe-Coburg and Gotha) (Duchy of Saxe-Altenburg) (Saxe-Meiningen) Ernestine duchies: Grand Cross of the Saxe-Ernestine House Order, May 1849
- Oldenburg: Grand Cross of the Order of Duke Peter Friedrich Ludwig, with Golden Crown, 25 November 1854
- Kingdom of Prussia: Knight of the Red Eagle, 1st Class, 5 April 1860
- Sweden-Norway: Commander Grand Cross of the Sword, 14 September 1855
- United Kingdom: India General Service Medal with Pegu Clasp

== Ancestry ==
Ancestors of Prince William of Hesse-Philippsthal-Barchfeld

8. William, Landgrave of Hesse-Philippsthal-Barchfeld
4. Adolph, Landgrave of Hesse-Philippsthal-Barchfeld
9. Princess Charlotte Wilhelmine of Anhalt-Bernburg-Schaumburg-Hoym
2. Charles, Landgrave of Hesse-Philippsthal-Barchfeld
10. Anton Ulrich, Duke of Saxe-Meiningen
5. Princess Louise of Saxe-Meiningen
11. Princess Charlotte Amalie of Hesse-Philippsthal
1. Prince William of Hesse-Philippsthal-Barchfeld
12. Charles Paul Ernest, Count of Bentheim-Steinfurt
6. Louis William Geldricus Ernest, Prince of Bentheim and Steinfurt
13. Princess Sophie Charlotte of Nassau-Siegen
3. Princess Sophie of Bentheim and Steinfurt
14. Friedrich, Duke of Schleswig-Holstein-Glücksburg
7. Princess Juliane Wilhelmine of Schleswig-Holstein-Glücksburg
15. Countess Auguste of Lippe-Detmold
