= Princess Marie Adelheid of Lippe =

German Nazi socialite and writer (1895–1993)

Marie Adelheid of Lippe
- Princess Heinrich XXXII Reuss of Köstritz; Princess Heinrich XXXV Reuss of Köstritz
- Born: 30 August 1895; Drogelwitz, Glogau, Province of Silesia, Kingdom of Prussia, German Empire
- Died: 25 December 1993 (aged 98); Tangstedt, Schleswig-Holstein, Germany
- Spouse: Prince Heinrich XXXII Reuss of Köstritz (m. 1920; div. 1921) Prince Heinrich XXXV Reuss of Köstritz (m. 1921; div. 1923) Hanno Konopath (m. 1927; div. 1936)
- Issue: Prince Heinrich V Reuss of Köstritz
Names
- German: Marie Adelheid Mathilde Karoline Elise Alexe Auguste Albertine
- House: Lippe
- Father: Count Rudolf of Lippe-Biesterfeld
- Mother: Princess Caroline Luise of Ardeck

Princess Marie Adelheid of Lippe (30 August 1895 – 25 December 1993) was a socialite and writer who was active in Nazi Germany. As the wife of Friedrich Kurt "Hanno" Konopacki-Konopath (1882–1962), a prominent DNVP, later NSDAP official (Ministerial Councillor and State Finance Councillor in the Reich Debt Administration), Marie Adelheid was a well known and ardent supporter of the Nazi regime. She was instrumental in the Nordic Ring, a forum for the discussion of issues concerning race and eugenics.

Marie Adelheid also served as an aide to Minister of Food and Agriculture Richard Walther Darré, and produced numerous works of fiction, poetry, translations, and other books. After the end of World War II, she published translations of prominent Holocaust-denying works, such as Paul Rassinier's Le Drame des Juifs européens (The Drama of European Jews) into German in 1964.

== Family ==
Countess Marie Adelheid was born the youngest child and only daughter of Count Rudolf of Lippe-Biesterfeld (1856-1931), later Prince Rudolf of Lippe and his wife, Princess Caroline Luise of Ardeck (a morganatic granddaughter of Frederick William, Elector of Hesse). Her father, a son of Count Julius Peter of Lippe-Biesterfeld (1812-1884) and Countess Adelheid zu Castell-Castell (1818-1900), was an uncle of Prince Leopold IV, who ruled the small principality of Lippe from 1905 until the 1918 collapse of the German Empire in World War I. Marie Adelheid was also a first cousin once-removed of Prince Bernhard of Lippe-Biesterfeld (1911-2004) who, in 1937 became the prince consort of Juliana, future Queen of the Netherlands. Marie Adelheid's family could be traced back to the twelfth century and were reigning monarchs until she was 23 years old. In 1905, her branch of the House of Lippe inherited one of the two thrones held by the family (the other was the Principality of Schaumburg-Lippe, also within the German Empire) and Marie Adelheid became a princess of Lippe, dropping the suffix "Biesterfeld". When Germany's various kingdoms and principalities were abolished, the dynasty lost its throne and rank as royalty, but the republic allowed them to retain much of their property, as well as their princely title in the form of a surname.

== Marriages ==
At the age of 24, Marie Adelheid wed, in the castle in which she was born at Drogelwitz, Prince Heinrich XXXII Reuss, J(unior) L(ine), a man seventeen years her senior, who was her cousin in the fourth degree (their shared ancestor being King Frederick William II of Prussia) and in the sixth degree (both being descendants of George II of Great Britain). He belonged to a dynasty which reigned over two German principalities (Reuss) until abdication in 1918 of the one reigning Prince over both principalities. By tradition, the princes of his house used "Reuss" as a surname without any nobiliary particle such as "von" (of) or "zu" (at), and all the males bore the sole given name of Henry (Heinrich), distinguished each from the other by Roman numerals.

Heinrich XXXII was a son of Prince Heinrich VII Reuss J.L. (1825-1906) and his wife, Princess Marie of Saxe-Weimar, through whom he had, between 1894 and 1909, been near in the order of succession to the Dutch throne that was occupied by Queen Wilhelmina since 1890.

Soon after the wedding on 19 May 1920 the marriage began to break down: Marie Adelheid would give birth to a son, Prince Heinrich V, on 26 May 1921 and, in order to marry the father before she delivered the child, she divorced Heinrich XXXII at Guben on 18 February and on 12 April married his younger brother, Heinrich XXXV Reuss J.L. (1887-1936) who, to be eligible for the elopement to Bremen, had divorced his wife of 10 years, Princess Maria of Saxe-Altenburg (1888-1947), on 4 March. When Heinrich V was two years old, on 23 June 1923, his parents obtained a divorce in Berlin. Thereafter, Marie Adelheid used the title Princess Reuss zur Lippe.

Marie Adelheid married a third and final time to commoner Hanno Konopath (born surnamed "Konopacki"), a Nazi government official, on 24 February 1927. This marriage also ended in divorce nine years later in 1936, but not before it generated important contacts for her in the German regime.

== Issue ==
- Prince Heinrich V Reuss of Köstritz (b. 26 May 1921, d. 28 Oct 1980), married morganatically on 22 June 1961 with Ingrid Jobst. They had three children:
  - Marie Alexandra Luise Hermine Dora Helene Reuss of Köstritz (b. 1 September 1963), married on 13 July 1985 to Eberhard, Count of Erbach-Erbach (b. 2 June 1958), grandson of Josias, Hereditary Prince of Waldeck and Pyrmont. They had three children:
    - Countess Felicitas Alexandra Magita Elena of Erbach-Erbach (b. 27 June 1987).
    - Franz Georg Albrecht Wittekind Karl-Emich Raimund Kraft Carl, Hereditary Count of Erbach-Erbach (b. 6 June 1989).
    - Count Franz Konrad Ludwig Heinrich Gustav of Erbach-Erbach (b. 12 December 1991).
  - Heinrich Ico Reuss of Köstritz (b. 18 October 1964), married on 17 July 1999 to Baroness Corinna von Elmendorff. They had one daughter:
    - Henriette Josephine Viktoria Luise Reuss of Köstritz (b. 16 November 2000).
  - Caroline Marie Adelheid Freia Gabriele Elisabeth Reuss of Köstritz (b. 30 December 1968), married on 25 October 1995 to Sebastian Papst.

== Nazi Germany ==
=== Early years ===
Alarmed by the failure of their class to respond to the troubles occurring in Germany, many younger members of royal families joined the emerging Nazi Party and other radical right-wing groups. In the beginning, many of them were women. Like the Hesse family, the Lippe dynasty joined the Nazi Party in great numbers (ultimately eighteen members would eventually join). Some German states provided a proportionally higher number of SS officers, including Hesse-Nassau and Lippe, Marie Adelheid's birthplace. As an ardent believer of the party's views, Marie Adelheid developed strong connections to the emerging Nazi regime, and became a leading socialite during that time.

She embraced "blood and soil" notions with great enthusiasm, and belonged to the paganist sect of Nazism. In 1921, the same year of her divorce, Marie Adelheid published Gott in mir (God In Me) in Bremen. A small work of forty-one pages, its spacious layout and the exceptional quality of its paper is evidence that while Germany was suffering from an economic depression, the book was distributed in small quantities to a select, wealthy clientele. It is likely that soon after producing this work, Marie Adelheid was already moving in far-right circles or on the verge of becoming an ardent Nazi; she became employed as an aide to the Nazi Minister of Food and Agriculture, Richard Walther Darré (a friend of her third husband's). Her cousin Ernst, Hereditary Prince of Lippe (son of Leopold IV, Prince of Lippe) was also employed under Darré. As he was her mentor (and referred to her as "little sister"), Marie Adelheid devoted her writing talent to promoting Nazi ideals, in particular those of Darré. These essays included Nordische Frau und Nordischer Glaube [Nordic Women and Nordic Religion] (1934), Deutscher Hausrat [Setting up the German Household] (1936), two edited collections of writings by Darre, and two novels, Mutter Erde [Mother Earth] (1935), and Die Overbroocks [The Overbroocks] (1942).

=== Nordic Faith Movement ===
In the late 1920s, Marie Adelheid regularly attended meetings for the paganist Nordic Ring, which was a forum for the discussion of issues concerning race and eugenics. Her third husband was a leader of this group. Konopath was a member of the Race and Culture Division in the Reich Leadership Office. The group was a great proponent of the "Nordic idea", in which they believed that the Occidental and Germanic cultures were a creation of the Nordic race. To them, the Nordic race had been "losing ground rapidly" in the new industrial age due to an influx of "inferior" races to the enlarging cities; their goal was thus to reverse this trend before Germany followed France, Italy, and Spain in racial decline. Through these meetings, Marie Adelheid emerged as a leader of the Nordic Faith Movement. At one meeting she presided over in March 1935, she stated that children should be forbidden from reading the Old Testament and asserted that there was not much sense in reading the New Testament.

"In the Old Testament, the greatest and most sacred things are treated as a variety of sin. One should not, therefore, place in children's hands the sort of tales of which the Old Testament is made up. However, the new Testament is not much better. Throughout the Old Testament woman is treated as something shameful. We read there that a woman who has borne a child should make a sacrifice".

In the same meeting, Marie Adelheid also called on other Nordic pagans to remember that "thousands of blond-haired, blue-eyed women" had been burned as witches during the Middle Ages, a fact, she declared, that meant they should be avenged by bringing back to life the old Nordic faith.

The Nordic Faith professed by Konopath and Marie Adelheid soon declined in importance. Wilhelm Kube, the leader of the Nazi Party in the Prussian parliament and a fervent Christian, soon discovered that Konopath belonged to "a school of thought that even the most radical of Kube's group could no longer consider Christian". Soon afterwards, Kube had Konopath ejected from his DC responsibilities; he was additionally deprived of all his party offices on "grounds of immorality".

=== Fall of Darré ===
As the war caused unwelcome developments, Darré's romantic "blood and soil" views suffered as new and more efficient plans were produced by important Nazi officials Heinrich Himmler and Hermann Göring. As Darré's influence declined, so did that of Marie Adelheid and her cousin, as their family lacked a viable power base. While Darré retired to his hunting lodge outside Berlin, she and Ernst continued their activities under the Nazi regime until the end of the war.

== Post-World War II ==
After World War II ended, Marie Adelheid continued her extreme right-wing activities, working as an author and translator, as well as being active in various neo-Nazi organizations. She translated Paul Rassinier's Holocaust-denying work, Le Drame des Juifs européens (The Drama of European Jews), into German in 1964, and also published two more volumes of poetry.

She gave financial support to Die Bauernschaft, a periodical launched by neo-Nazi Thies Christophersen in 1969. As a result of his publications, Christophersen was threatened with imprisonment for spreading Nazi propaganda, and finally had to leave Germany for Denmark. In 1971, Marie Adelheid assumed the editorship and continued to keep the "blood and soil" ideas that had been so cherished under her and Darré in circulation.

== Death ==
Marie Adelheid died on Christmas Day 25 December 1993 in Tangstedt, Schleswig-Holstein, Germany, aged 98.

== List of works ==
Marie Adelheid produced and published many different works under the names Marie Adelheid Prinzessin Reuss-zur Lippe and Marie Adelheid Konopath throughout her life. All of these original works contained right-wing propaganda, both during and after the fall of the Nazi regime.

=== Novels ===
- Mutter Erde [Mother Earth] (1935)
- Die Overbroocks [The Overbroocks] (1942)

=== Poetry ===
- Gott in Mir [God in Me] (1921)
- Weltfrommigkeit (1960)
- Freundesgruss (1978)

=== Essays ===
- Das bist du [That is you] (1924)
- Deutscher Hausrat [Setting up the German Household] (1936)
- Nordische Frau und Nordischer Glaube [Nordic Women and Nordic Religion] (1934)
- Feiern im Jahresring (1968)
- Small contributions to the monthly magazine Odal. Monatsschrift für Blut und Boden (1932–1942)

=== Translations ===
As a speaker of French, English, and German, Marie Adelheid produced translations of various works after the end of World War II. Along with Paul Rassinier's Holocaust-denying work The Drama of the European Jews, Marie Adelheid also translated Lenora Mattingly Weber's work My True Love Waits from French into German and Harry Elmer Barnes' Perpetual War For Perpetual Peace: A Critical Examination of the Foreign Policy of Franklin Delano Roosevelt from English into German, among others.

== Ancestry ==
Ancestors of Princess Marie Adelheid of Lippe

16. Count Karl of Lippe-Biesterfeld
8. Count Ernst of Lippe-Biesterfeld
17. Countess Ferdinande of Bentheim-Tecklenburg-Rheda
4. Julius, Count of Lippe-Biesterfeld
18. Karl Philipp von Unruh
9. Modeste von Unruh
19. Elisabeth Henriette Dorothea von Kameke
2. Prince Rudolf of Lippe
20. Count Friedrich Carl of Castell-Castell
10. Friedrich, Count of Castell-Castell
21. Countess Amalie of Löwenstein-Wertheim-Virneburg
5. Countess Adelheid of Castell-Castell
22. Karl Ludwig, Prince of Hohenlohe-Langenburg
11. Princess Emilie of Hohenlohe-Langenburg
23. Countess Amalie Henriette of Solms-Baruth
1. Princess Marie Adelheid of Lippe
24. Adolf, Landgrave of Hesse-Philippsthal-Barchfeld
12. Charles, Landgrave of Hesse-Philippsthal-Barchfeld
25. Princess Louise of Saxe-Meiningen
6. Prince William of Hesse-Philippsthal-Barchfeld
26. Louis William Geldricus Ernest, Prince of Bentheim and Steinfurt
13. Princess Sophie of Bentheim and Steinfurt
27. Princess Juliane of Schleswig-Holstein-Sonderburg-Glücksburg
3. Princess Luise of Ardeck
28. William II, Elector of Hesse
14. Frederick William, Elector of Hesse
29. Princess Augusta of Prussia
7. Princess Marie of Hanau and Horowitz
30. Johann Gottfried Falkenstein
15. Gertrude Falkenstein, Princess of Hanau
31. Magdalena Schulz

== Sources ==
- Gossman, Lionel (2009). Brownshirt Princess: A Study of the "Nazi Conscience". Cambridge: OpenBook Publishers. p. 1. "adelheid."
- Petropoulos, Jonathan (2006). Royals and the Reich: The Princes von Hessen in Nazi Germany. New York: Oxford University Press. ISBN 9780199796076.
- Steigmann-Gall, Richard (2003). The Holy Reich: Nazi Conceptions of Christianity, 1919-1945. New York: Cambridge University Press. ISBN 9780521823715.
