= County of Steinfurt =

County of Steinfurt Grafschaft Steinfurt
- c. 1100–1806
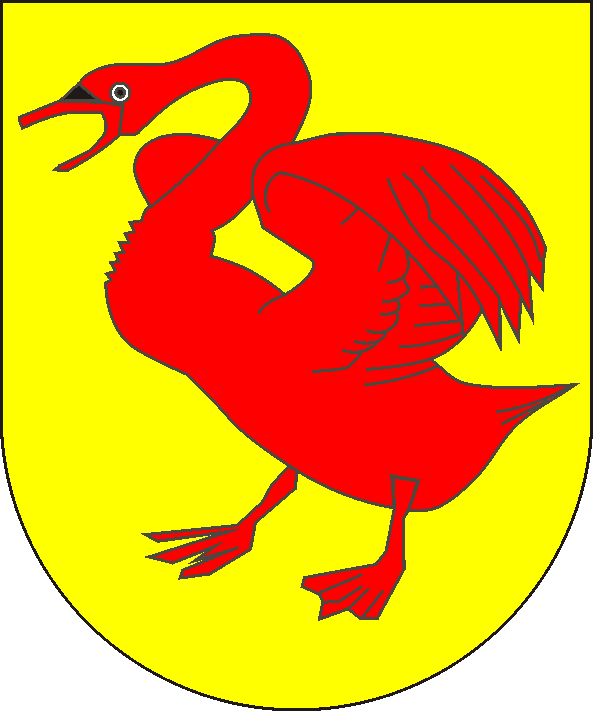
- Coat of arms

- Map of the Lower Rhenish–Westphalian Circle around 1560, County of Steinfurt highlighted in red
- Status: County
- Capital: Steinfurt
- Common languages: German
- Religion: Roman Catholicism; Lutheranism; (Majority from 1544)
- Type: County
- Historical era: Middle Ages, Early modern period
  - Established: c. 1100
  - Disestablished: 1806
Succeeded by
Berg (state)
- Today part of: North Rhine-Westphalia

The County of Steinfurt (German: Grafschaft Steinfurt), originally the Lordship of Steinfurt (Herrschaft Steinfurt), was a historic territory of the Holy Roman Empire in the Münsterland. It existed from roughly 1100 until 1806.

== History ==
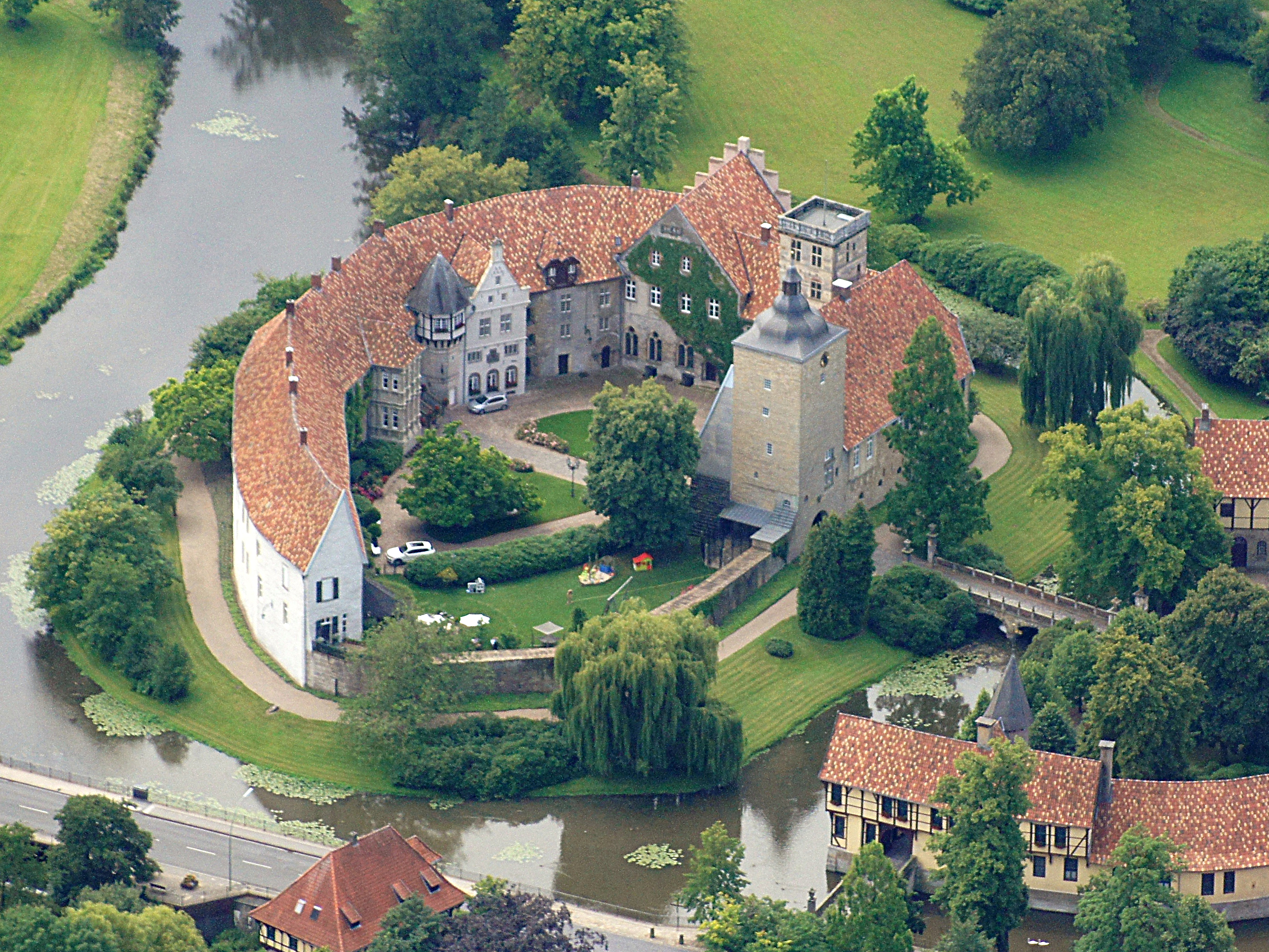
Steinfurt Castle

The Lordship of Steinfurt developed around Steinfurt Castle, first mentioned in 1129 but destroyed in feuds several times over the centuries. The name was originally Stenvorde, referencing a stone ford on the nearby river Aa. In 1357, the lords of Steinfurt became immediate Imperial Counts when they acquired the County of Laer. Still, in 1396, they had to recognize the Prince-Bishop of Münster as the sovereign over Steinfurt.

The House of Bentheim came into possession of the Lordship of Steinfurt through marriage in 1421. In 1454, the various Bentheim lands were separated, with Count Arnold I zu Bentheim-Steinfurt taking the Lordship of Steinfurt. In 1495, Steinfurt was raised to the status of an immediate Imperial County by Maximilian I, removing Münster as overlord. Like the County of Bentheim, Steinfurt belonged to the Lower Rhenish–Westphalian Circle.

In 1544, Count Arnold II converted the county to Lutheranism, introducing the Augsburg Confession. Three years later, Münster questioned Steinfurt's imperial immediacy in the Imperial Chamber Court; the case would take hundreds of years. Count Arnold IV invited Lutheran preachers to his lands, including Steinfurt, to help correctly convert the people to Protestantism. He established an academy in Steinfurt for teaching theology, law, philosophy, and medicine in 1590. In 1606, he died, leading to another splitting of the Bentheim lands.

In 1660, Münster invaded again, taking control of Steinfurt. In 1688, Count Ernst Wilhelm converted back to Catholicism and expelled the Protestant preachers. This status lasted until 1701, when his son, also named Count Ernst, converted back to Lutheranism.

In 1806, with the dissolution of the Holy Roman Empire, the county was absorbed by the Grand Duchy of Berg over the protestations of the Bentheim-Steinfurt family, then led by Count Louis William Geldricus Ernest. In 1810, the county became part of France, although they were driven out by the Prussians following the Battle of Leipzig in 1813. In 1815, following the Congress of Vienna, Steinfurt became part of the Kingdom of Prussia. Count Louis and his descendants were recognised as mediatised princes.

Today, it is part of North Rhine-Westphalia. The castle itself is still owned by the princes of Bentheim-Steinfurt.

== Counts of Bentheim-Steinfurt (1454–1806) ==
- Arnold I (1454–1466)
- Eberwin II (1466–1498)
- Arnold II (1498–1544)
- Eberwin III (1544–1562)
- Arnold III (1562–1606)
- Anna of Tecklenburg (1562–1577) (regent)
- Arnold Jobst (1606–1643) with
  - William Henry (1606–1632) and
  - Frederick Ludolph (1606–1629) and
  - Conrad Gumbert (1606–1618)
- Ernest William (1643–1693)
- Ernest (1693–1713)
- Charles Frederick (1713–1733)
- Charles Paul Ernest (1733–1780)
- Louis William (1780–1806) raised to Prince in 1817

== (Mediatised) Princes of Bentheim and Steinfurt (1866–) ==
- Louis William, 1st prince of Bentheim-Steinfurt (1817)
- Alexius Frederick, 2nd prince of Bentheim-Steinfurt (1817–1866)
- Louis William, 3rd prince of Bentheim Steinfurt (1866–1890)
- Alexis, 4th prince of Bentheim-Steinfurt (1890–1919)
- Viktor Adolf, 5th prince of Bentheim-Steinfurt (1919–1961)
- Christian, 6th prince of Bentheim-Steinfurt (1961–)

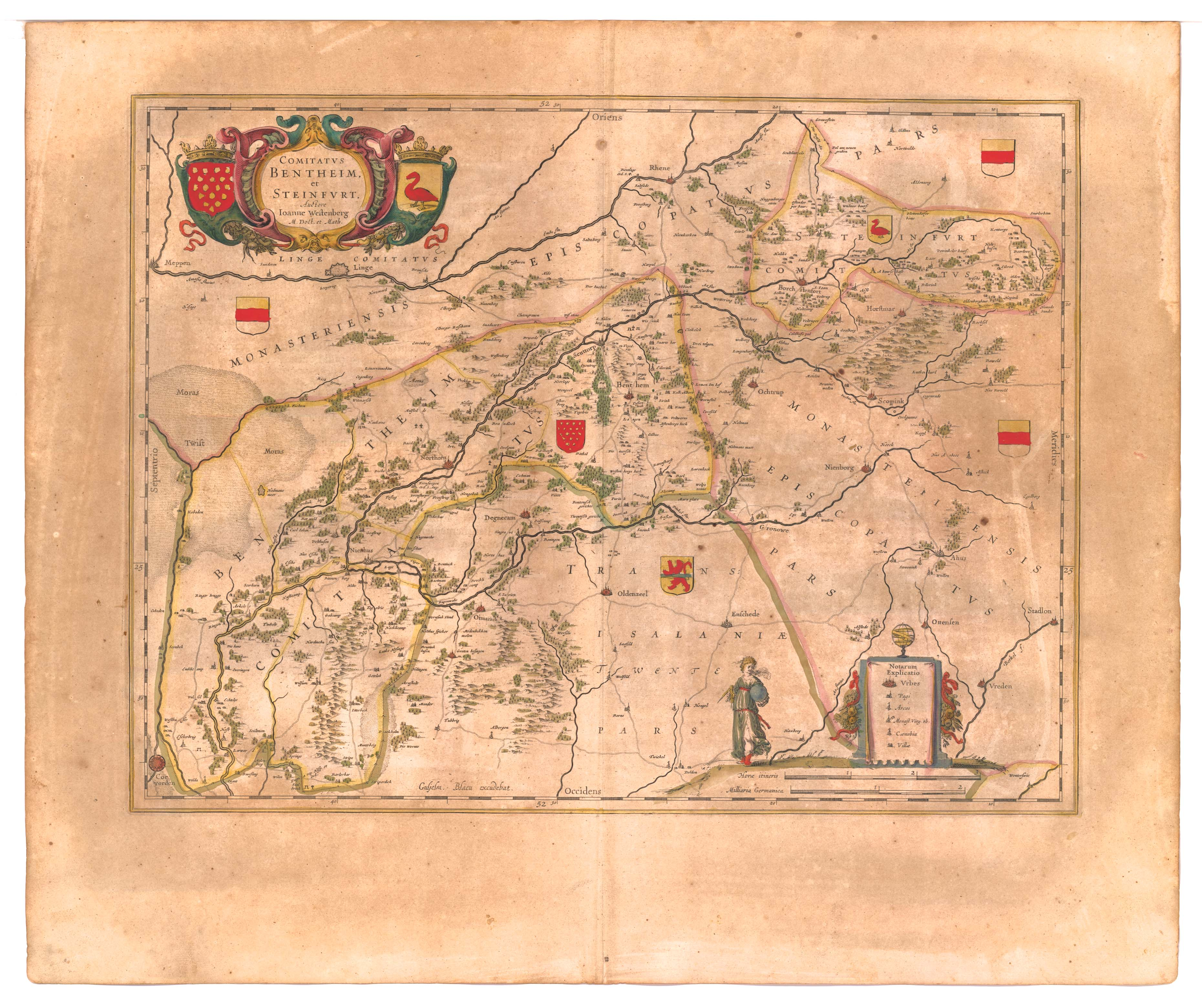
1645 map of the counties of Bentheim and Steinfurt

== Bibliography ==
Primary sources

- Gesetz-Sammlung für die Königlichen Preußischen Staaten. Berlin. 1815.
- Joseph Niesert. Codex diplomaticus Steinfordiensis oder Urkundensammlung zur Geschichte der Herrschaft Steinford. Volume 1. Coesfeld, 1834.
- Joseph Niesert. Codex diplomaticus Steinfordiensis oder Urkundensammlung zur Geschichte der Herrschaft Steinford. Volume 2. Coesfeld, 1835.
- Sammlung der Gesetze und Verordnungen, welche in dem Königlich Preußischen Erbfürstenthume Münster : und in den standesherrlichen Gebieten Horstmar, Rheina-Wolbeck, Dülmen und Ahaus-Bocholt-Werth; über Gegenstände der Landeshoheit, Verfassung, Verwaltung und Rechtspflege vom Jahre 1359 bis zur französischen Militair-Occupation und zur Vereinigung mit Frankreich und dem Großherzogthume Berg in den Jahren 1806 und resp. 1811 ergangen sind / Im Auftrage des Königlichen Preußischen Hohen Staats-Ministeriums gesammelt und herausgegeben [von Johann Josef Scotti]. Münster: Aschendorff, 1842.
- Inventare der nichtstaatlichen Archive Westfalens: Neue Folge / Im Auftrage des Landschaftsverbandes Westfalen-Lippe herausgegeben vom Landesamt für Archivpflege. Münster, Aschendorff.
- Inventare der nichtstaatlichen Archive des Kreises Steinfurt / bearb. unter Mitw. v. [Karl Georg] Döhmann von L[udwig] Schmitz-Kallenberg. Münster: Aschendorff, 1907.
- Inventar des Fürstlichen Archivs zu Burgsteinfurt : Allgemeine Regierungssachen der Grafschaften Bentheim und Steinfurt; Bestand A / bearb. von Alfred Bruns, Wilhelm Kohl; hrsg. von Alfred Bruns. Münster: Aschendorff, 1971.
- Inventar des Fürstlichen Archivs zu Burgsteinfurt : Regierungssachen der Grafschaften Bentheim und Steinfurt; Bestände A Bentheim; A Steinfurt; G / bearb. von Alfred Bruns, Hans-Joachim Behr; hrsg. von Alfred Bruns. Münster: Aschendorff, 1976.
- Inventar des Fürstlichen Archivs zu Burgsteinfurt : Schuldensachen, Familiensachen (Teilbestand); Reichs- und Kreissachen; Bestände C, D (Teilbestand), E; beab. von Alfred Bruns. Münster: Aschendorff, 1983.

Secondary sources

- Casser, Paul. 'Der Niederrheinisch-Westfälische Reichskreis.' In Der Raum Westfalen II, 2 (1934): 33–70.
- Karl Georg Döhmann (Hrsg.): Das Leben des Grafen Arnold von Bentheim 1554–1606. Nach den Handschriften herausgegeben. Winter, Burgsteinfurt 1903.
- Höting, Ingeborg. Studien zur Geschichte der Herrschaft Steinfurt : vornehmlich um 1500. Münster, 1985. Münster Univ., Magisterarbeit.
- Junk, Heinz-K. 'Das Großherzogtum Berg : Zur Territorialgeschichte des Rheinlandes und Westfalens in napoleonischer Zeit.' In Westfälische Forschungen 33 (1983): 29–83.
- Kohl, Wilhelm. 150 Jahre Landkreis Steinfurt : 1816-1966; Geschichte d. Kreisverwaltung. Steinfurt, 1966.
- Loewe, Walther. Das Gerichtswesen der Grafschaft Steinfurt. Münster 1913. Diss. Münster Univ.
- Stephanie Marra. Allianzen des Adels. Dynastisches Handeln im Grafenhaus Bentheim im 16. und 17. Jahrhundert. Böhlau, Köln 2007.
- Raet von Bögelscamp, Friedrich Freiherr von. Bentheim-Steinfurtische, Lagische, Oberysselsche und sonstige Beyträge : zur Geschichte Westphalens; zugleich ein Versuch einer Provinzial-Geschichte der merkwürdigen Grafschaft Bentheim; Aus Urkunden und gleichartigen Nachrichten. Burgsteinfurt: Denhard 1805. 2 volumes.
- Rudolf Rübel. 'Graf Arnold von Bentheim-Steinfurt 1554–1606.' In Westfälische Lebensbilder 9, Münster 1962: 18–33.
- Möller, Johann Caspar. Geschichte der vormaligen Grafschaft Bentheim : von den ältesten Zeiten bis auf unsere Tage. Lingen an d. Ems 1879.
- Nerlich, Otto. Der Streit um die Reichsunmittelbarkeit der ehemaligen Herrschaft und späteren Grafschaft Steinfurt : bis zum Flinteringischen Vertrag (1569). Hildesheim : Lax, 1913.
- Christof Spannhoff. 'Von Fakten und Fiktionen: Die Ursprünge der Edelherren von Steinfurt.' In Nordmünsterland. Forschungen und Funde 3 (2016): 220–243.
- Peter Veddeler. 'Das Testament des Grafen Arnold von Bentheim vom Jahre 1591.' In Das Bentheimer Land 76, 1973: 71–88.
- Veddeler, P[eter]. Politische Geschichte der Grafschaft Bentheim von 1421 bis 1701.In Reform. Bekenntnis Bentheim 1988: 9-60.
