= Alexis, Prince of Bentheim and Steinfurt =

Alexis
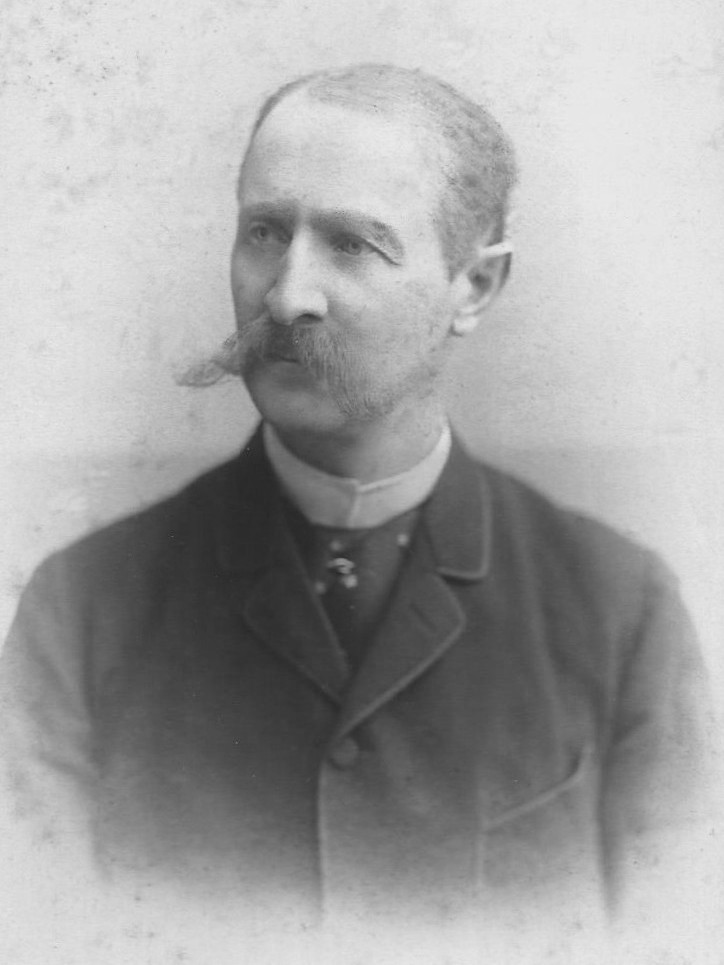

Prince of Bentheim and Steinfurt
- Reign: 28 September 1890 –21 January 1919
- Predecessor: Ludwig Wilhelm
- Successor: Viktor Adolf
- Born: 17 November 1845; Burgsteinfurt, Kingdom of Prussia
- Died: 21 January 1919 (aged 73); Burgsteinfurt, Weimar Republic
- Spouse: Pauline of Waldeck and Pyrmont (m. 1881)
- Issue: Prince Eberwyn; Victor Adolf, Prince of Bentheim and Steinfurt; Prince Karl Georg; Princess Elisabeth; Princess Viktoria; Princess Emma; Prince Alexis Rainer; Prince Friedrich
Names
- Alexis Carl Ernst Louis Ferdinand Eugen Bernhard; German: Alexis Carl Ernst Louis Ferdinand Eugen Bernhard
- House: Bentheim-Steinfurt
- Father: Ludwig Wilhelm, Prince of Bentheim and Steinfurt
- Mother: Landgravine Bertha of Hesse-Philippsthal-Barchfeld

Alexis (Alexis Carl Ernst Louis Ferdinand Eugen Bernhard; 17 November 1845 – 21 January 1919) was a lieutenant general, statesman, and the Prince of Bentheim and Steinfurt from 28 September 1890 to 21 January 1919.

== Biography ==
=== Early life ===
Alexis was born in Burgsteinfurt, Kingdom of Prussia on 17 November 1845 and was the fourth child and eldest son of Ludwig Wilhelm, Prince of Bentheim and Steinfurt (1812–1890) and his wife Landgravine Bertha of Hesse-Philippsthal-Barchfeld (1818–1888).

Alexis was a brother of Adelheid, Landgravine Wilhelm of Hesse-Philippsthal-Barchfeld (1840–1880), Juliane, Landgravine Wilhelm of Hesse-Philippsthal-Barchfeld (1842–1878), Marie, Princess of Sayn-Wittgenstein-Hohenstein (1843–1931), Prince Karl of Bentheim and Steinfurt (1848–1854), and Prince Georg of Bentheim and Steinfurt (1851–1939).

=== Education and military career ===
Alexis attended high school in Burgsteinfurt and attended university at the University of Bonn, where he was a member of the Corps Borussia Bonn. In 1866, Alexis was a lieutenant in the Hanoverian Guards Hussars Regiment and in 1868, he was transferred to the Hussars Regiment No. 7.

In 1873, he advanced to first lieutenant and then to Rittmeister in the Regiment der Gardes du Corps in 1875. In 1884, Alexis advanced to major à la suite in the army. In 1892 Alexis was made lieutenant colonel, then colonel in 1895, and major general in 1899. In 1902, he was awarded the uniform of the Regiment der Garde du Corps Lieutenant General.

=== Political career ===
Alexis succeeded his father Ludwig Wilhelm to the headship of the Princely House of Bentheim and Steinfurt. As such, he became a member of the Prussian House of Lords.

== Marriage and issue ==
Alexis married Princess Pauline of Waldeck and Pyrmont, second child and daughter of George Victor, Prince of Waldeck and Pyrmont and his first wife Princess Helena of Nassau, on 7 May 1881 in Arolsen, Principality of Waldeck and Pyrmont. Alexis and Pauline had eight children:

- Prince Eberwyn of Bentheim and Steinfurt (10 April 1882 – 31 July 1949)

∞ 1906–1914 Pauline Langenfeld (1884–1970)
∞ 1918–1919 Ellen Bischoff-Korthaus (1894–1936), who later remarried Adolf II, Prince of Schaumburg-Lippe
∞ 1920 Anne-Louise Husser (1891–1951)

- Victor Adolf, Prince of Bentheim and Steinfurt (18 July 1883 – 4 June 1961)

∞ 1920 Princess Stephanie of Schaumburg-Lippe (1899–1925), daughter of Princess Louise of Denmark.
∞ 1931 Princess Rosa Helene of Solms-Hohensolms-Lich (1901–1963)

- Prince Karl Georg of Bentheim and Steinfurt (10 December 1884 – 14 February 1951)

∞ 1914 Princess Margarete of Schönaich-Carolath (1888–1980)

- Princess Elisabeth of Bentheim and Steinfurt (12 July 1886 – 8 May 1959)
- Princess Viktoria of Bentheim and Steinfurt (18 August 1887 – 30 January 1961)
- Princess Emma of Bentheim and Steinfurt (19 February 1889 – 25 April 1905)
- Prince Alexis Rainer of Bentheim and Steinfurt (16 December 1891 – 30 June 1923)
- Prince Friedrich of Bentheim and Steinfurt (27 May 1894 – 17 May 1981)

∞ 1934 Louise von Gülich (1893-1949)

== Honours ==
He received the following orders and decorations:

- Kingdom of Prussia:
  - Knight of the Royal Crown Order, 1st Class
  - Iron Cross, 2nd Class
  - Knight of Honour of the Johanniter Order, 13 February 1893; Commander
- (Principality of Schaumburg-Lippe) Lippe: Cross of Honour of the House Order of Lippe, 1st Class with Swords
- Luxembourg: Grand Cross of the Oak Crown
- Mecklenburg: Grand Cross of the Wendish Crown, with Crown in Ore
- Netherlands: Grand Cross of the Netherlands Lion
- Sweden-Norway: Commander Grand Cross of the Polar Star, 7 May 1881
- United Kingdom: Honorary Grand Cross of the Royal Victorian Order, 10 February 1904
- Principality of Waldeck and Pyrmont: Order of Merit, 1st Class
- Württemberg:
  - Grand Cross of the Friedrich Order, 1884
  - Grand Cross of the Württemberg Crown, 1891

== Ancestry ==
Ancestors of Alexis, Prince of Bentheim and Steinfurt

8. Louis William Geldricus Ernest, Prince of Bentheim and Steinfurt
4. Alexius, Prince of Bentheim and Steinfurt
9. Princess Juliane Wilhelmine of Schleswig-Holstein-Sonderburg-Glücksburg
2. Ludwig Wilhelm, Prince of Bentheim and Steinfurt
10. Wilhelm, Prince of Solms-Braunfels
5. Princess Wilhelmine of Solms-Braunfels
11. Countess Auguste Franziska of Salm-Grumbach
1. Alexis, Prince of Bentheim and Steinfurt
12. Adolph, Landgrave of Hesse-Philippsthal-Barchfeld
6. Charles, Landgrave of Hesse-Philippsthal-Barchfeld
13. Princess Luise of Saxe-Meiningen
3. Landgravine Bertha of Hesse-Philippsthal-Barchfeld
14. Friedrich Ludwig, Prince of Hohenlohe-Ingelfingen
7. Princess Auguste of Hohenlohe-Ingelfingen
15. Countess Marianne Amalie of Hoym

== Bibliography ==
- Hermann A. L. Degener: Wer ist's?, V, Leipzig 1911, S. 89

Alexis, Prince of Bentheim and Steinfurt House of Bentheim and Steinfurt Cadet branch of the House of Bentheim Born: 17 November 1845 Died: 21 January 1919
German royalty
| Preceded by Ludwig Wilhelm | Prince of Bentheim and Steinfurt; 28 September 1890 – 21 January 1919 | Succeeded by Viktor Adolf |
