= Maria von Hanau-Hořowitz =

Maria of Hanau-Hořowitz
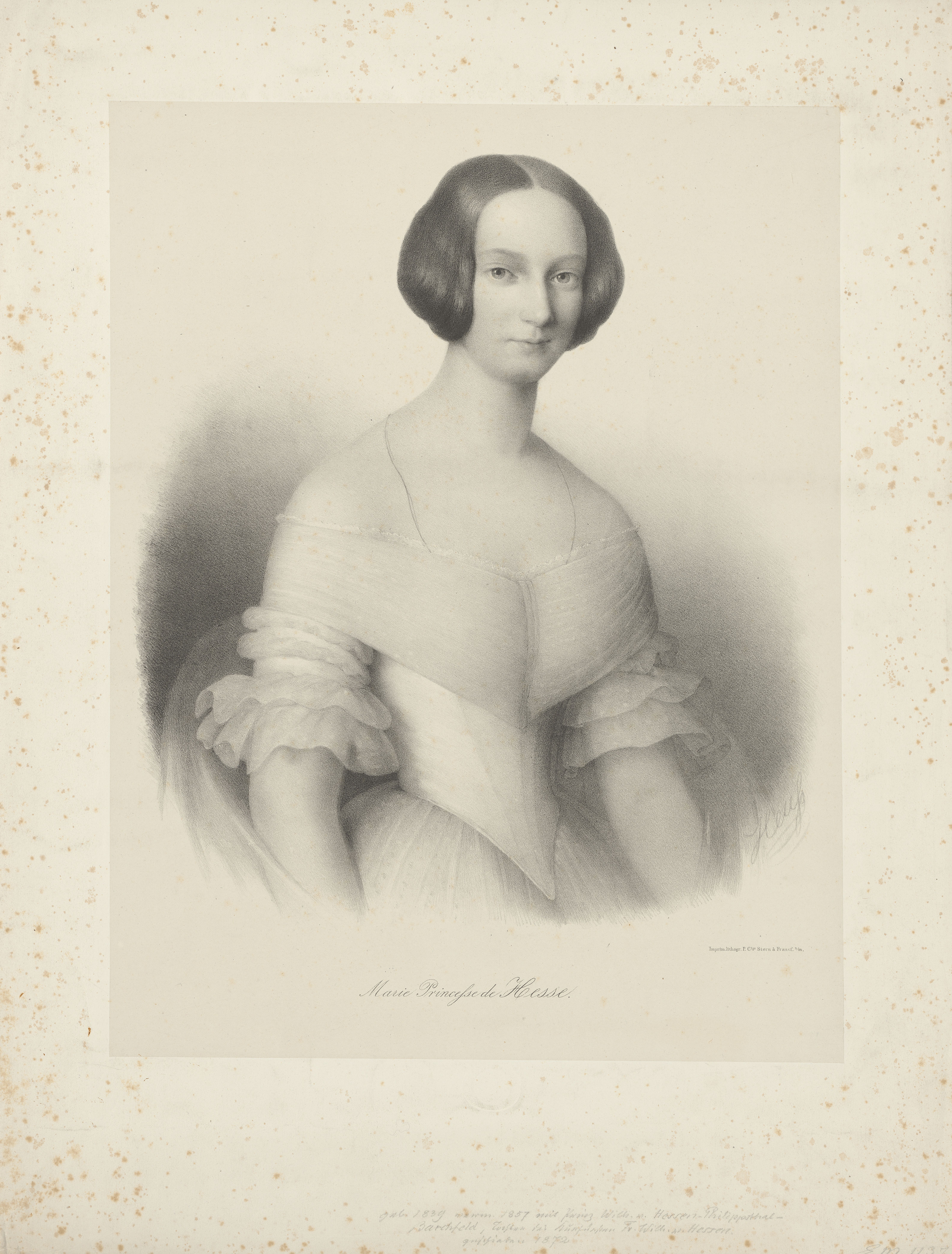
- Born: 22 August 1839; Schloss Wilhelmshöhe
- Died: 26 March 1917 (aged 77); Bonn
- Spouse: Prince William of Hesse-Philippsthal-Barchfeld (m. 1857; div. 1872)
- Issue Detail: Prince Friedrich; Prince Carl; Princess Elisabeth; Princess Marie; Princess Luise
- House: House of Hesse
- Father: Frederick William I, Elector of Hesse
- Mother: Gertrude von Hanau

Princess Maria of Hanau and Hořowitz (22 August 1839 – 26 March 1917) was a German aristocrat.

== Early life ==
Princess Maria was the youngest daughter of Frederick William, Elector of Hesse (1802–1875), and his morganatic wife, Gertrude Falkenstein (1803–1882), whom he later elevated to Princess of Hanau and Hořowitz (German: Fürstin von Hanau und zu Hořowitz).

Her paternal grandparents were Prince William, later William II, Elector of Hesse, and Princess Augusta of Prussia (a daughter of King Frederick William II of Prussia). Her maternal grandparents were Johann Gottfried Falkenstein and his wife, Magdalena Schulz.

== Personal life ==
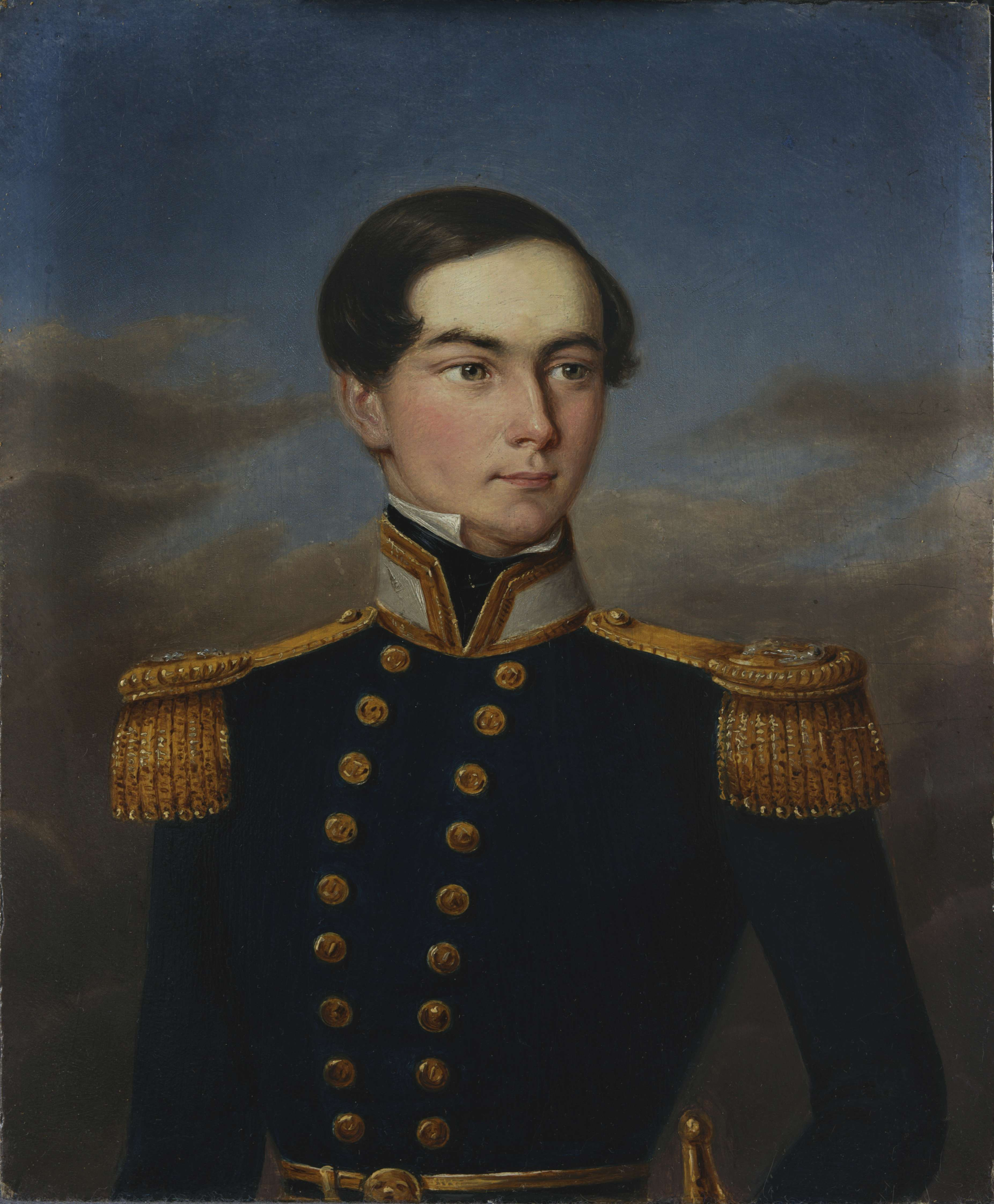
Her husband, Prince William of Hesse-Philippsthal-Barchfeld, c. 1850–1860.

Prince Frederick of Holstein (later the pretender to the throne of Schleswig-Holstein) asked for Princess Maria's hand, but he was rejected. He eventually married Princess Adelheid of Hohenlohe-Langenburg (the second daughter of Ernst I, Prince of Hohenlohe-Langenburg and Princess Feodora of Leiningen, who was the older, maternal half-sister of the British Queen Victoria) on 11 September 1856.

On 27 December 1857, Maria married Prince William of Hesse-Philippsthal-Barchfeld (1831–1890), son of Landgrave Charles. With this marriage, her mother hoped to bind her family closer to the House of Hesse; the Grand Duke of Hesse-Darmstadt; however, regarded William's marriage as morganatic and refused to acknowledge the five children from this marriage as Hessian princes. The children nevertheless used their father's style and title until 1876, when they were made Princes/ses of Ardeck. They were:

- Friedrich Wilhelm, Prince of Ardeck (1858–1902), who married American heiress Anne Hollingsworth Price, on 17 December 1890.
- Carl, Prince of Ardeck (1861–1938), who married in 1891 Anne Elise Strehlow.
- Elisabeth, Princess of Ardeck (1864–1919), who married in 1886 Count Ferdinand of Ysenburg-Büdingen in Philippseich.
- Alice, Princess of Hesse-Philippsthal-Barchfeld (1867–1868), who died in infancy and before receiving the title of Princess of Ardeck.
- Luise, Princess of Ardeck (1868–1959), who married in 1889 Prince Rudolf of Lippe (1856–1931), a son of Julius, Count of Lippe-Biesterfeld. Her daughter was Princess Marie Adelheid of Lippe.

Maria and Prince William were divorced on 18 March 1872. In August 1873, William married his niece, Princess Juliane of Bentheim and Steinfurt (daughter of his older half-sister Bertha and her husband, Prince Ludwig of Bentheim and Steinfurt). His third marriage was to Princess Juliane's older sister Adelheid and his fourth marriage was to Princess Auguste of Schleswig-Holstein-Sonderburg-Glücksburg, a daughter of Friedrich, Duke of Schleswig-Holstein-Sonderburg-Glücksburg and niece of King Christian IX of Denmark. They were the parents of Prince Christian of Hesse-Philippsthal-Barchfeld. Prince William died at Rotenburg on 17 January 1890.

=== Later life ===
She and her two surviving daughters, Elisabeth and Luise, moved to Wiesbaden. She continued to style herself Princess of Hesse, and got into a dispute about her title with Frederick William (not to be confused with her father), the former heir presumptive of Hesse-Kassel, who held that she had lost the right to use that title due to her divorce. After she lost the court case, she asked Emperor William I to provide her with a new title. The imperial court sent her a list of castles in Nassau to choose from — apparently court officials in Berlin were confused about the various former principalities that made the new Hesse-Nassau province — and she chose Ardeck. Ardeck Castle is a ruin near Holzheim, which is situated in today's Rhein-Lahn-Kreis. From 28 July 1876, she and her children were styled Princes of Ardeck and Princesses of Ardeck.

She later moved to Bonn, where she died in 1917.

== Ancestry ==
Ancestors of Maria von Hanau-Hořowitz

8. William I, Elector of Hesse
4. William II, Elector of Hesse
9. Princess Wilhelmina Caroline of Denmark
2. Frederick William, Elector of Hesse
10. Frederick William II of Prussia
5. Princess Augusta of Prussia
11. Frederika Louisa of Hesse-Darmstadt
1. Maria, Princess of Ardeck
12. Nikolaus Falkenstein
6. Gottfried Falkenstein
13. Margarete Heyss
3. Gertrude Falkenstein, Princess of Hanau
14. Johann Ludwig Albert Schulz
7. Marie Magdalene Schulz
15. Sophie Krups
