= Charles, Landgrave of Hesse-Philippsthal-Barchfeld =

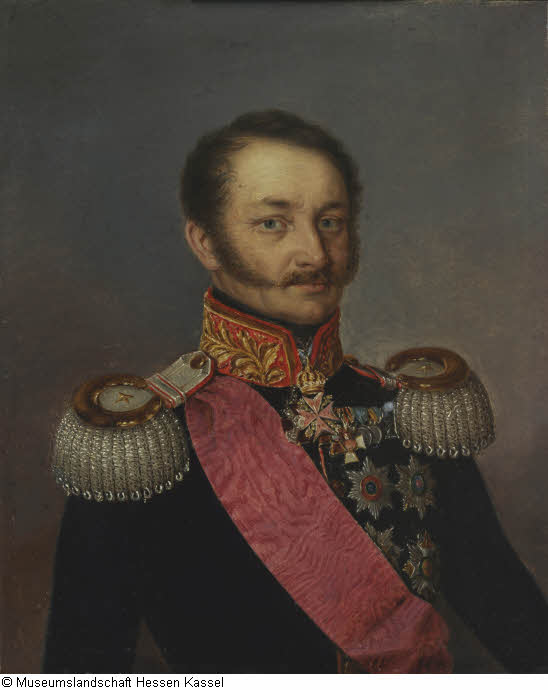
- Portrait by an unknown artist, c. 1850
- Born: 27 June 1784; Barchfeld
- Died: 17 July 1854 (aged 70); Philippsthal
- Spouse: Auguste of Hohenlohe-Ingelfingen (m. 1816; died 1821) Sophie of Bentheim and Steinfurt (m. 1823)
- Issue: Alexis, Landgrave of Hesse-Philippsthal-Barchfeld; Prince William
- House: House of Hesse
- Father: Adolph, Landgrave of Hesse-Philippsthal-Barchfeld
- Mother: Princess Louise of Saxe-Meiningen

Landgrave Charles August Ludwig Philip of Hesse-Philippsthal-Barchfeld (27 June 1784 in Barchfeld – 17 July 1854 in Philippsthal) was a member of the House of Hesse and was the ruling Landgrave of Hesse-Philippsthal-Barchfeld from 1803 to 1806 and from 1813 until his death.

== Life ==
Charles was a son of the Landgrave Adolph of Hesse-Philippsthal-Barchfeld (1743-1803) from his marriage to Princess Louise of Saxe-Meiningen (1752-1805 ), the daughter of the Duke Anton Ulrich of Saxe-Meiningen. In 1803, he succeeded his father as Landgrave of Hesse-Philippsthal-Barchfeld.

In 1806, Hesse-Philippsthal-Barchfeld was annexed by the Kingdom of Westphalia. After Napoleon had been defeated in the Battle of Leipzig, Charles was restored as Landgrave of Hesse-Philippsthal-Barchfeld under the supremacy of the Electorate of Hesse.

Charles served in the Prussian and later joined the Russian army. He fought on the Russian side in the Napoleonic Wars, in particular in the Battle of Borodino. After he retired from the Russian military service, he joined the Hessian army, where he was promoted to lieutenant general in 1836.

He later lived at Augustenau Castle in Herleshausen.

== Marriage and issue ==
Charles first married on 19 Jul 1816, in Öhringen, to Auguste of Hohenlohe-Ingelfingen (1793-1821), the daughter of Prince Frederick Louis, Prince of Hohenlohe-Ingelfingen, with whom he had the following children:

- Bertha (1818-1888), married in 1839 Prince Louis of Bentheim and Steinfurt (1812-1890)
- Emily (1821-1836)

He married his second wife on 10 September 1823 in Steinfurt. She was Princess Sophie of Bentheim-Steinfurt (1794-1873), the daughter of Prince Louis William Geldricus Ernest of Bentheim and Steinfurt, with whom he had the following children:

- Victor (1824-1846)
- Alexander (1826-1841)
- Alexis (1829-1905), Landgrave of Hesse-Philippsthal-Barchfeld

married in 1854 to Princess Louise of Prussia (1829-1901), divorced in 1861

- William (1831-1890), married:
  1. in 1857 morganatically to Princess Maria of Hanau-Hořowitz (1839-1917), divorced in 1872
  2. in 1873 to Princess Juliane of Bentheim and Steinfurt (1842-1878), had issue including Chlodwig, Landgrave of Hesse-Philippsthal-Barchfeld
  3. in 1879 to Princess Adelheid of Bentheim and Steinfurt (1840-1880)
  4. in 1884 to Princess Augusta of Schleswig-Holstein-Sonderburg-Glücksburg (1844-1932), they were the parents of Prince Christian of Hesse-Philippsthal-Barchfeld

== Ancestors ==
Ancestors of Charles, Landgrave of Hesse-Philippsthal-Barchfeld

8. Philip, Landgrave of Hesse-Philippsthal
4. William, Landgrave of Hesse-Philippsthal-Barchfeld
9. Countess Catherine Amalie of Solms-Laubach
2. Adolph, Landgrave of Hesse-Philippsthal-Barchfeld
10. Lebrecht, Prince of Anhalt-Zeitz-Hoym
5. Princess Charlotte Wilhelmine of Anhalt-Bernburg-Schaumburg-Hoym
11. Baroness Eberhardine Jacobine Wilhelmine of Weede
1. Charles, Landgrave of Hesse-Philippsthal-Barchfeld
12. Bernhard I, Duke of Saxe-Meiningen
6. Anton Ulrich, Duke of Saxe-Meiningen
13. Elisabeth Eleonore of Brunswick-Wolfenbüttel
3. Princess Louise of Saxe-Meiningen
14. Charles I, Landgrave of Hesse-Philippsthal
7. Charlotte Amalie of Hesse-Philippsthal
15. Duchess Christina of Saxe-Eisenach

Charles, Landgrave of Hesse-Philippsthal-Barchfeld House of Hesse Born: 27 June 1784 Died: 17 July 1854
Preceded by Adolph	Landgrave of Hesse-Philippsthal-Barchfeld; 1803-1854	Succeeded by Alexis
