= Prince Ernest Frederick of Hesse-Philippsthal-Barchfeld =

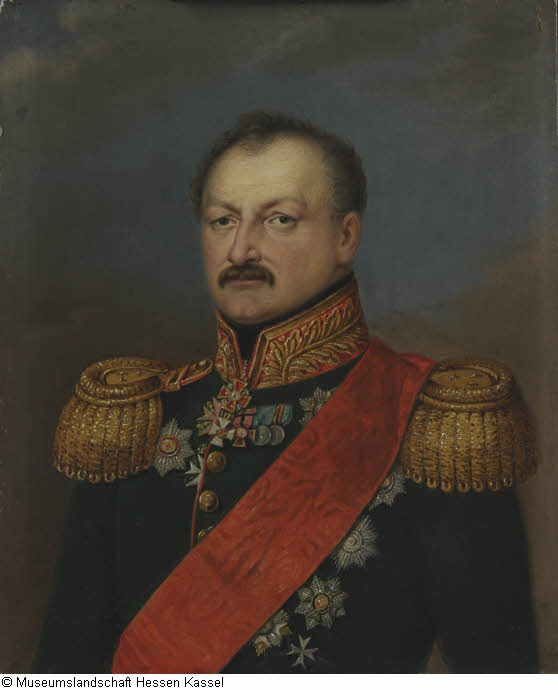
Prince Ernest Frederick of Hesse-Philippsthal-Barchfeld around 1845

Ernst von Hessen-Philippsthal-Barchfeld (28 January 1789, Barchfeld – 19 April 1850, Castle Augustenau in Herleshausen) was a member of the German House of Hesse and a military officer of the Imperial Russian Army.

== Biography ==
Ernst von Hesse-Filipsthal-Barchfeld was born on January 28, 1789, in Barchfeld in Thuringia (Germany), as son of Landgrave Adolph (1742-1803) by marriage to Princess Louise of Saxe-Meiningen (1752-1805).

When his homeland was overrun by the French, he fled to Russia and was admitted into Russian service as lieutenant colonel in the 6th Jaeger Regiment on May 29, 1808.

On October 23, 1811, Hesse-Filipstal-Barchfeld was dismissed from service for health reasons but re-admitted on June 23, 1812, with the promotion to colonel and the appointment in the cavalry. He took part in the Patriotic War of 1812. He was seriously wounded on August 29, 1812, at the Battle of Borodino when his leg was torn off by a cannonball.

On August 22, 1826, he was promoted to lieutenant general.

On September 9, 1836, at his own request, he was released from service with the rank of general from cavalry and with the right to wear a uniform; in addition, as a sign of the special favor of Tsar Nicholas I, he was awarded the Order of St. Alexander Nevsky for excellent service.

He travelled to Great Britain, where his cousin, Queen Adelaide of Saxe-Meiningen, supported him in finding a good craftsman for an artificial leg. Ernst von Hessen became an Honorary Knight Grand Cross in the Order of Bath and after King William IV died, he was present at the Coronation of Queen Victoria.

Ernst von Hesse-Philipsthal-Barchfeld died on April 19, 1850, in Herleshausen.
