= Ludwig Wilhelm, Prince of Bentheim and Steinfurt =

Ludwig Wilhelm
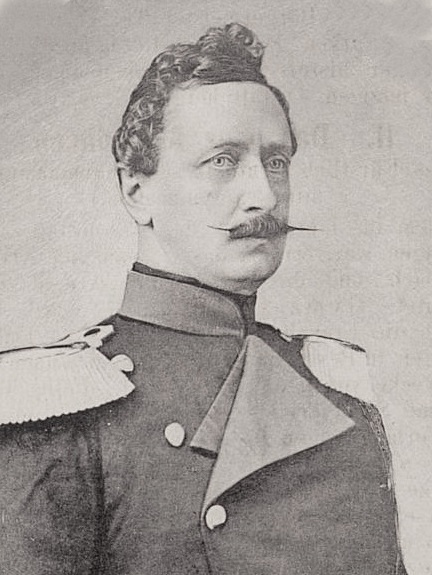

Prince of Bentheim and Steinfurt
- Reign: 3 November 1866 – 28 September 1890
- Predecessor: Alexius
- Successor: Alexis
- Born: 1 August 1812; Burgsteinfurt, Kingdom of Hanover
- Died: 28 September 1890 (aged 78); Burgsteinfurt, Kingdom of Prussia, German Empire
- Spouse: Landgravine Bertha of Hesse-Philippsthal-Barchfeld (m. 1839; died 1888)
- Issue: Adelheid, Landgravine Wilhelm of Hesse-Philippsthal-Barchfeld; Juliane, Landgravine Wilhelm of Hesse-Philippsthal-Barchfeld; Marie, Princess of Sayn-Wittgenstein-Hohenstein; Alexis, Prince of Bentheim and Steinfurt; Prince Karl; Prince Georg
Names
- German: Ludwig Wilhelm; Louis William
- House: House of Bentheim and Steinfurt
- Father: Alexius, Prince of Bentheim and Steinfurt
- Mother: Countess Wilhelmine of Solms-Braunfels

Ludwig Wilhelm, Prince of Bentheim and Steinfurt (German: Ludwig Wilhelm Fürst zu Bentheim und Steinfurt; 1 August 1812 – 28 September 1890) was a Royal Hanoverian and Prussian Lieutenant General and the Prince of Bentheim and Steinfurt from 3 November 1866 to 28 September 1890.

== Early life ==
Ludwig Wilhelm was born in Burgsteinfurt, Electorate of Hanover on 1 August 1812 and was the eldest son and child of Alexius, Prince of Bentheim and Steinfurt (1781–1866) and his wife Princess Wilhelmine of Solms-Braunfels (1793–1865). Ludwig Wilhelm was an elder brother of Prince Wilhelm Ferdinand of Bentheim and Steinfurt (1814–1849), Prince Julius Arnold of Bentheim and Steinfurt (1815–1857), Prince Karl Everwin of Bentheim and Steinfurt (1816–1854), Princess Augusta Juliana of Bentheim and Steinfurt (1817–1880), and Prince Ferdinand Otto of Bentheim and Steinfurt (1819–1889).

== Military career ==
From 1844, Ludwig Wilhelm was made Rittmeister à la suite of the Royal Hanoverian Regiments Garde du Corps and rose to major in 1849. In 1855, Ludwig Wilhelm was made lieutenant colonel, colonel in 1859, major general in 1862, and lieutenant general in 1879.

== Political career ==
In 1866, Ludwig Wilhelm succeeded his father as head of the Princely House of Bentheim and Steinfurt. As such, he became a hereditary member of the Prussian House of Lords and the First Chamber of the Diet of the Kingdom of Hanover. Following Hanover's annexation by Prussia, Ludwig Wilhelm served as a member of Westphalian Provincial Council.

Beginning in 1875, Ludwig Wilhelm became a member of the Württembergian Chamber of Lords. He inherited the seat from his childless uncle Prince Ferdinand of Solms-Braunfels who died in 1873. After 1884, Ludwig Wilhelm was represented at the Württembergian Chamber of Lords in Stuttgart by his son, Alexis.

== Marriage and issue ==
Ludwig Wilhelm married Landgravine Bertha of Hesse-Philippsthal-Barchfeld, eldest child and daughter of Charles, Landgrave of Hesse-Philippsthal-Barchfeld and his first wife Princess Augusta of Hohenlohe-Ingelfingen, on 27 June 1839 at Schloss Barchfeld, Barchfeld. Ludwig Wilhelm and Bertha had six children:

- Princess Adelheid of Bentheim and Steinfurt (17 May 1840 – 31 January 1880)

∞ 1879 Prince William of Hesse-Philippsthal-Barchfeld (1831–1890)

- Princess Juliane of Bentheim and Steinfurt (5 January 1842 – 29 April 1878)

∞ 1873 Prince William of Hesse-Philippsthal-Barchfeld (1831–1890)

- Princess Marie of Bentheim and Steinfurt (26 October 1843 – 22 January 1931)

∞ 1867 Ludwig, Prince of Sayn-Wittgenstein-Hohenstein (1831–1912)

- Alexis, Prince of Bentheim and Steinfurt (17 November 1845 – 21 January 1919)

∞ 1881 Princess Pauline of Waldeck and Pyrmont (1855–1925)

- Prince Karl of Bentheim and Steinfurt (21 February 1848 – 15 March 1900)
- Prince Georg of Bentheim and Steinfurt (28 June 1851 – 28 April 1939)

∞ 1889 Gertrud Porth (1866–1942), created Freifrau von Althaus by Ernest II, Duke of Saxe-Coburg and Gotha

== Honours and awards ==
He received the following orders and decorations:

- Kingdom of Hanover:
  - Grand Cross of the Royal Guelphic Order, 1841
  - Grand Cross of the Order of Ernst August
- Saxe-Weimar-Eisenach: Grand Cross of the White Falcon, 12 February 1847
- Electorate of Hesse: Grand Cross of the Golden Lion, 23 December 1848
- Denmark: Grand Cross of the Dannebrog, 6 June 1867
- Kingdom of Prussia:
  - Knight of Honour of the Johanniter Order, 28 May 1836
  - Grand Cross of the Red Eagle, 6 September 1877
- Luxembourg: Grand Cross of the Oak Crown

== Ancestry ==
Ancestors of Ludwig Wilhelm, Prince of Bentheim and Steinfurt

8. Charles Paul Ernest, Count of Bentheim-Steinfurt
4. Ludwig, Prince of Bentheim and Steinfurt
9. Princess Charlotte of Nassau-Siegen
2. Alexius, Prince of Bentheim and Steinfurt
10. Friedrich, Duke of Schleswig-Holstein-Sonderburg-Glücksburg
5. Princess Juliane Wilhelmine of Schleswig-Holstein-Sonderburg-Glücksburg
11. Princess Henriette Auguste of Lippe-Detmold
1. Ludwig Wilhelm, Prince of Bentheim and Steinfurt
12. Ferdinand, Prince of Solms-Braunfels
6. William, Prince of Solms-Braunfels
13. Countess Sophie of Solms-Laubach
3. Princess Wilhelmine of Solms-Braunfels
14. Karl, Count of Salm-Grumbach
7. Countess Auguste Franziska of Salm-Grumbach
15. Princess Elisabeth Christiane of Leiningen

== Literature ==
- Frank Raberg: Biographisches Handbuch der württembergischen Landtagsabgeordneten 1815–1933. Kohlhammer Verlag, Stuttgart 2001

Ludwig Wilhelm, Prince of Bentheim and Steinfurt House of Bentheim and Steinfurt Cadet branch of the House of Bentheim Born: 1 August 1812 Died: 28 September 1890
German royalty
| Preceded by Alexius | Prince of Bentheim and Steinfurt; 3 November 1866 – 28 September 1890 | Succeeded by Alexis |
