= Princess Louise of Prussia (1829–1901) =

Louise of Prussia
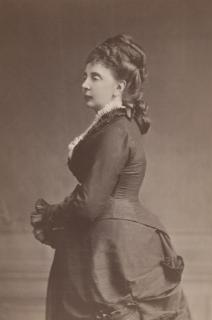
- Princess Louise c. 1860

Landgravine consort of Hesse-Philippsthal-Barchfeld
- Tenure: 17 July 1854 – 6 March 1861
- Born: 1 March 1829; Berlin
- Died: 10 May 1901 (aged 72); Frankfurt
- Spouse: Alexis, Landgrave of Hesse-Philippsthal-Barchfeld (m. 1854; div. 1861)
Names
- German: Maria Louise Anna
- House: Hohenzollern
- Father: Prince Charles of Prussia
- Mother: Princess Marie of Saxe-Weimar-Eisenach

Marie Louise Anna of Prussia (1 March 1829, Berlin – 10 May 1901, Frankfurt am Main) was a Prussian princess and member of the House of Hohenzollern.

== Early life ==
She was the second child and eldest daughter of Prince Charles of Prussia and his wife, Princess Marie of Saxe-Weimar-Eisenach. Her grandfather was King Frederick William III of Prussia, her paternal uncle William I, German Emperor, while her maternal aunt was Empress Augusta.

== Marriage ==
There were failed negotiations for a marriage between her and King Charles XV of Sweden. On 27 June 1854 she married Alexis, Landgrave of Hesse-Philippsthal-Barchfeld, head of the cadet branch of the House of Hesse, at Charlottenburg Palace. The marriage remained childless and ended with a divorce on 6 March 1861.

== Death ==
Louise died on 10 May 1901 in Frankfurt am Main, predeceasing Landgrave Alexis, her former husband by four years.

== Ancestry ==
Ancestors of Princess Louise of Prussia (1829–1901)

8. Frederick William II of Prussia
4. Frederick William III of Prussia
9. Princess Frederica Louisa of Hesse-Darmstadt
2. Prince Charles of Prussia
10. Charles II of Mecklenburg-Strelitz
5. Duchess Louise of Mecklenburg-Strelitz
11. Princess Friederike of Hesse-Darmstadt
1. Princess Louise of Prussia
12. Karl August, Grand Duke of Saxe-Weimar-Eisenach
6. Charles Frederick, Grand Duke of Saxe-Weimar-Eisenach
13. Princess Louise of Hesse-Darmstadt
3. Princess Marie of Saxe-Weimar-Eisenach
14. Paul I of Russia
7. Grand Duchess Maria Pavlovna of Russia
15. Duchess Sophie Dorothea of Württemburg
