= Barchfeld =

- Ortsteil of Barchfeld-Immelborn
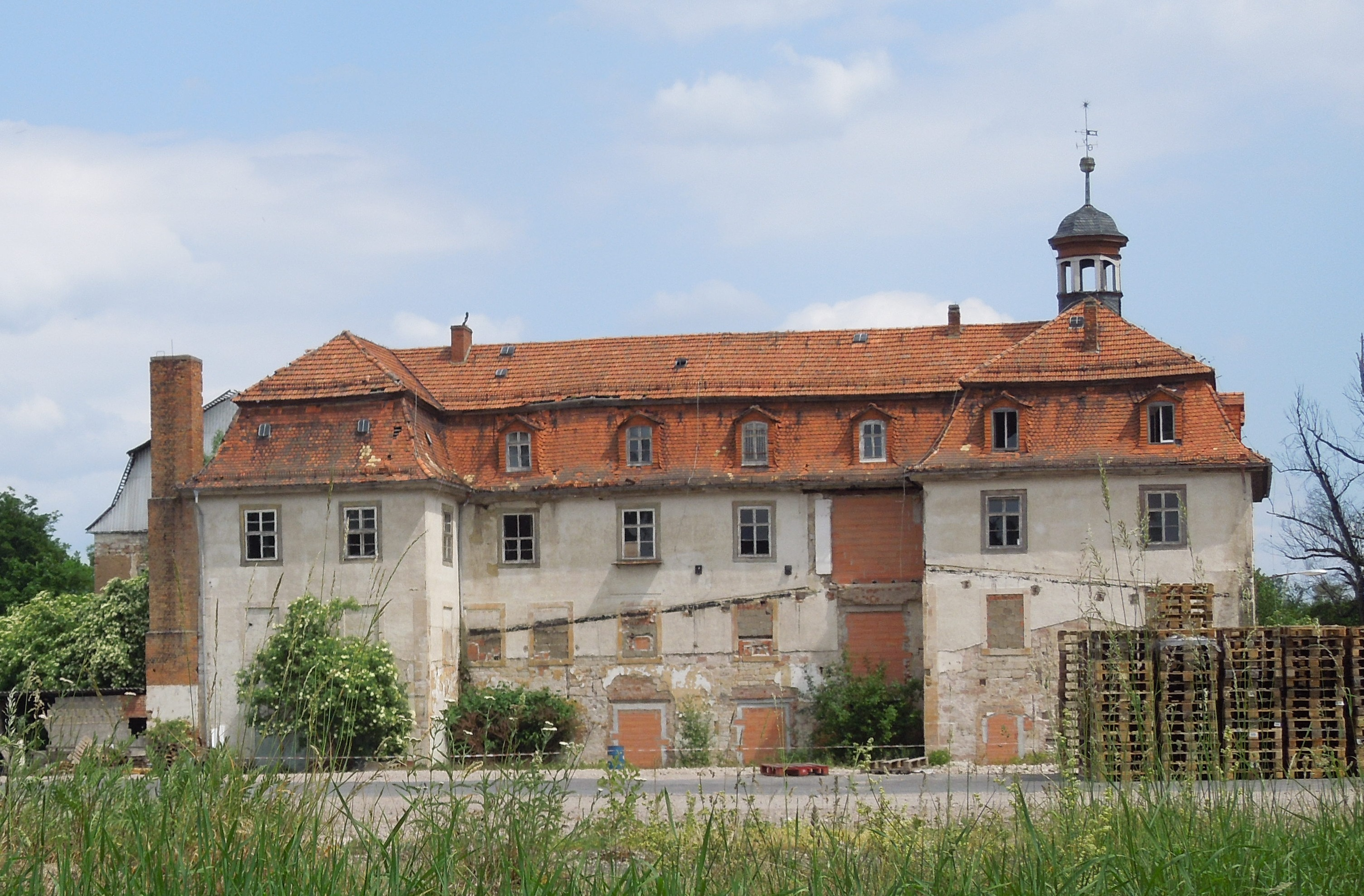

- Coat of arms
- Interactive map of Barchfeld
- Location within Germany Location within Thuringia
- Coordinates: 50°48′2″N 10°18′14″E
- Country: Germany
- State: Thuringia
- District: Wartburgkreis
- Municipality: Barchfeld-Immelborn

Area
  - Total: 11.34 km^{2} (4.38 sq mi)
- Elevation: 254 m (833 ft)

Population (2011-12-31)
  - Total: 3,144
  - Density: 277.2/km^{2} (718.1/sq mi)
- Time zone: UTC+01:00 (CET)
  - Summer (DST): UTC+02:00 (CEST)
- Postal codes: 36456
- Dialling codes: 036961
- Vehicle registration: WAK

Barchfeld (German pronunciation: [ˈbaʁçfɛlt]) is a village and a former municipality in the Wartburgkreis district of Thuringia, Germany. Since 31 December 2012, it is part of the municipality Barchfeld-Immelborn.

== Geography ==
The village lies in the southwest of Thuringia in the valley of the Werra between the Thüringer Wald and the Rhön. In Barchfeld the Schweina flows into the Werra.

Neighbouring villages are Immelborn in the west, Bad Salzungen in the north-west, Witzelroda (municipality of Moorgrund) in the north, the town of Bad Liebenstein and its Schweina district in the north-west and Breitungen/Werra (district of Schmalkalden - Meiningen) in the south.

== History ==
The oldest evidence of the settlement of Barchfeld dates back to the Bronze Age. During work in a gravel pit at the Linsenkopf, shattered urns and grave goods were uncovered, a bronze clasp was given to the priest of the time, and other finds ended up in the local museum of Bad Liebenstein. With the extension of Frankish rule under Charlemagne to Saxon-Thuringian tribal territory, the first Christian missionaries also came to the Werratal. Following the establishment of the Bistum Erfurt and the monastery of Fulda by the Anglo-Saxon papal authorised bishop Winfrid, better known as Boniface, the uninterrupted work of the church began in the 8th century. Barchfeld initially received a small wooden church, which was followed by several subsequent buildings. They were probably consecrated to the Virgin Mary.

High Middle Ages: The present-day village of Barchfeld arose on the right bank of the Werra and lay under the protection of a lowland castle, which was located in the floodplain of the Werra and whose main task was the protection of the neighbouring royal estate Königsbreitungen to the east. Its possessions were transferred to the Premonstratensian double monastery Herrenbreitungen and Frauenbreitungen around 1250. Around 915, the royal Palatinate Breitungen was destroyed by the Hungarians during their invasions into the Frankish Empire. In the year 933 Barchfeld and Breitungen were mentioned for the first time in the so-called royal charter of Henry I. as "Barcuelda" and "Bretinga". The document, which was reproduced in the Royal Chancellery, describes the boundaries of the Mark Breitungen, which were located at an important Werra ford and covered an area of about 280 square kilometres.

Old-Barchfeld: According to the evaluation of archival documents (cadastral map from 1772), the original settlement of Barchfeld was located in the area of the later castle park and around the church of Barchfeld. A major fire in 1749 destroyed large parts of this village, including the church and rectory. The original village was surrounded by a fortification of ramparts, fences and ditches and had two gates - the Schenkentor was located next to the inn "Zur Sonne", through the Fischertor one reached the Nürnberger Straße, the old army road in the Werratal. In the village there was a brewery, the village school and two outdoor courts. The farms which could be proven by feudal contracts with the landlords were Hopfen Gut, Witzels Gut, Perlets Gut, Hünisches Gut, Schmidts Gut, Stockhauser Gut, Vintzen Gut, Heringer Gut and Langen Gut. There were also farms and mills outside the village: The "Gehöft Grimmelbach" (farm Grimmelbach) and the "Scherfstedter Hof" (farm Scherfstedt), which was already mentioned in 1330, existed until the 16th century, the corridors of the two deserts were later divided. At times there was a ferry house on the banks of the Werra, and near the village there were two cutting yards - probably used as sawmills.

Late Middle Ages: Barely five kilometres to the west of Barchfeld, Frankenstein Castle was situated on a steeply sloping spur of the Werra, the ancestral seat of the Frankenstein dynasts, who also acted as protectors of the neighbouring monasteries. The Frankensteins' attempts to assert themselves against the strongest powers in the region - the Fulda monastery and the Thuringian landgraves - led to their decline. In 1265 Frankenstein Castle was besieged and partially destroyed by Abbot Bertho II. of Fulda. In 1295, King Adolf also succeeded in doing so, although the castle was probably badly damaged again. As a direct consequence, Barchfeld Castle gained further importance and was expanded. The Frankensteins, financially ruined by fighting, sold most of their possessions to their cousins, the Counts of Henneberg, in 1330.

The family of the lords of Stein-Liebenstein zu Barchfeld were active as castle men of the Barchfeld moated castle. From 1318 to 1387 at the latest, the lords of Stein received the castle and village of Barchfeld as a fief of the Hennebergs and initially became the sole lords of Barchfeld. The pledge to the monastery of Fulda in 1350 was only of short duration, as the monastery was at that time in feud with the landgraves of Hesse: with the support of the landgraves of Thuringia, many of the monastery estates were militarily conquered, including the splinter property of Barchfeld. The Burgmannen von Stein succeeded in changing the fronts in time and therefore managed to keep the castle estate.

As part of the dominion of Schmalkalden, Barchfeld belonged partly to the Landgraviate of Hesse from 1360 and completely from 1583. In 1387, Wetzel von Stein the Elder and his son Wetzel the Younger, who were in financial difficulties, sold three quarters of their property in Barchfeld to the Landgrave Hermann von Hessen. A truce was made with the Hennebergers to regulate the administration of Barchfeld, now under divided rule. As a result of the Hessian partial takeover, the Lords of Stein had to hand over parts of their castle to Hessian castle men (von Buchenau, von Herda). Through marriage and inheritance in 1527, Ludwig von Boyneburg zu Gerstungen, the court judge of Hesse, came into the possession of the lords of Herda. Two castles were subsequently built in the place of the already very dilapidated moated castle. The Lords of Stein-Liebenstein zu Barchfeld had the Steinsche Schloss built between 1571 and 1581 in the Stylish Renaissance style; it was located directly next to the former moat. By this time, the Boyneburgers had already completed their castles in Stadtlengsfeld and Weilar, where they performed the necessary official duties; in Barchfeld, only a manor house served as their official residence.

Apparently during this time the first wooden bridge over the Werra was built, but its existence was short-lived due to flooding and ice. Only in 1738 a new construction of the Werra bridge was commissioned.

The Jewish community of Barchfeld was founded in the 16th century and formed a centre of Jewish life in the region. The Reformation was introduced in the 16th century. During the Thirty Years' War, the population of the Barchfeld area, which is part of Hesse-Darmstadt by inheritance, suffered particularly in 1634 and 1635 from attacks by both warring parties. As a result of the plague and other introduced diseases, only six families in the village survived. In 1640, the writer of the church chronicle noted that many of the survivors had gone abroad.

In 1721 Barchfeld became the seat of the Landgraves of Hesse-Philippsthal-Barchfeld, a branch of the Hessian princes, which emerged in 1721 from the branch of Hesse-Philippsthal, who built Wilhelmsburg Castle between 1690 and 1732, directly adjacent to Steinschs Schloss, as a three-winged baroque castle. Hessen-Philippsthal-Barchfeld is one of the two remaining lines of the former Hessian princely house.

A large fire caused by a bell caster in September 1753 destroyed almost all the courtyards and buildings of the village, including the church and the rectory. The church was rebuilt within three years in the style of the late Baroque. The Evangelical Lutheran congregation later changed its name to an evangelical congregation.

Reconstruction and industrialisation: During the reconstruction after the Great Fire, the Seven Years' War broke out and inhibited the economic development of the village. With the construction of the stone Werra Bridge in 1739, the traffic volume around Barchfeld had increased enormously.

Foreign haulers needed pre-tensioning services and provisions, so the Barchfeld population also received work and earning opportunities. In the first third of the 19th century, the country roads were gradually expanded as cobbled chausseen: in 1828, the Nürnberger Straße was expanded in several construction lots from Eisenach to Meiningen, from 1836 to 1837 the Chaussee was built from Immelborn to Bad Salzungen, in 1845 the gap was closed to the road to Schweina, in 1858 the newly planned Liebensteiner Straße was built. In 1865, all Chausseen and overland roads were taken over by the state and thus the Chausseegeld was abolished as a usage levy. In the inner city, bridges and footbridges were built, water ditches and back alleys were fortified with gravel. The large-scale project of pavement and sewerage was only completed in Barchfeld in the 1920s as an emergency work. The extension of the rail network from Bad Salzungen to Breitungen and Meiningen was carried out via Immelborn. In order to develop the area around Schweina and Steinbach, which is also important for mining, the Immelborn-Barchfeld-Liebenstein-Schweina railway line was built in three years and inaugurated in 1889.

The attempts of Prince Ernst of Hesse-Philippsthal in the 19th century to set up a tobacco factory were unsuccessful. Industrial development began at the end of the 19th century, and at the beginning of the 20th century Barchfeld developed into a centre of bicycle accessories production through the business idea of Eduard Reum. After 1917, the Pallas-Werk. Im First World War, 101 inhabitants had to be mourned, a memorial to the fallen in the village reminds them of them.

In 1944 Barchfeld was incorporated by the Nazi government into the administrative district of Erfurt under the administration of the Reichsstatthalter for Thuringia in Weimar.

In October 1944, an American Boeing B-17 ("Flying Fortress") was shot down at an altitude of about 7000m during the air battles over Thuringia. The nine-strong crew managed to get out of the plane over the Eichsfeld, which now reached Barchfeld without a pilot and descended on the meadows at the Werraufer. The aircraft wreckage was immediately dismantled and probably transferred to The AirMan's Shipyard in Dessau.

20th and 21st centuries: In 1994, Barchfeld and the neighbouring municipality of Immelborn (with the districts of Übelroda, Ettmarshausen and Hauenhof) formed the administrative community of Barchfeld. On 3 November 2011, the mayors of immelborn and Barchfeld signed a contract for the integration of Immelborn into Barchfeld and the formation of the municipality of Barchfeld-Immelborn in 2012.

On 31 December 2012, the municipalities of Barchfeld and Immelborn merged to become the new municipality of Barchfeld-Immelborn. At the same time, the administrative community of Barchfeld was dissolved
