= Alexius, Prince of Bentheim and Steinfurt =

- Born: 20 January 1781
- Died: 3 November 1866 (aged 85)
- Noble family: Bentheim-Steinfurt
- Spouse: Wilhelmina of Solms-Braunfels (m. 1811; died 1865)
- Issue: Ludwig Wilhelm, Prince of Bentheim and Steinfurt; Prince Wilhelm Ferdinand; Prince Julius Arnold; Prince Karl Everwin; Princess Augusta Juliana; Prince Ferdinand Otto
- Father: Louis William Geldricus Ernest of Bentheim and Steinfurt
- Mother: Juliane Wilhelmine of Schleswig-Holstein-Sonderburg-Glücksburg

Alexius Frederick, Prince of Bentheim and Steinfurt (20 January 1781 – 3 November 1866) was a German nobleman.

== Life ==
He descended from the younger branch of the House of Bentheim-Steinfurt. His father was Prince Louis William Geldricus Ernest of Bentheim and Steinfurt; his mother was Juliane Wilhelmine of Schleswig-Holstein-Sonderburg-Glücksburg

He studied in Marburg under Johann Stephan Pütter. In 1817, he succeeded his father as Prince of Bentheim and Steinfurt. In 1821, the Bentheim-Tecklenburg-Rheda line of the family sued him, claiming to have better rights to the counties of Bentheim and Steinfurt. The court case about the parts of the counties in Prussia lasted until 1829; the trial about the parts in Hanover lasted even longer. Prince Alexius ultimately won both court cases.

Incidentally, the County of Bentheim had been pledged to Hanover long before his reign. In 1823, Alexius redeemed this loan. He began the restoration of the run-down Bentheim Castle. He built a spa around the sulphur-rich springs in the town of Bentheim. The town would change its name to Bad Bentheim in 1979, to reflect its status as a spa town.

Alexius was a member of the provincial parliament of the Prussian province of Westphalia. In 1847, he became a member of the short-lived United Parliament. In 1854, he officially became a member of the Prussian House of Lords; however he was never an active member.

== Marriage and issue ==
In 1811, he married Wilhelmina of Solms-Braunfels, first daughter and child of William Christian Carl, 3rd Prince of Solms-Braunfels. They had six children, including his heir Louis William.
