= Princess Charlotte Amalie of Hesse-Philippsthal =

Duchess consort of Saxe-Meiningen from 1763 to 1782

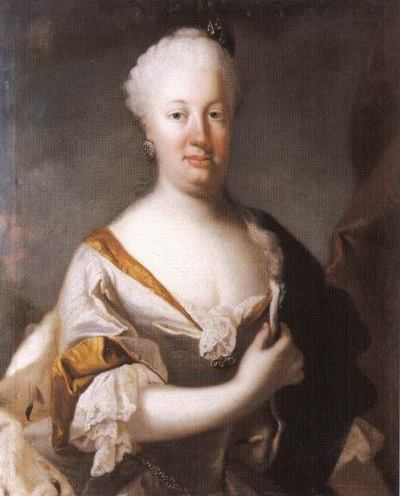
- Portrait of Charlotte Amalie, 18th century

Duchess consort of Saxe-Meiningen
- Tenure: 26 September 1750 – 27 January 1763
- Born: 11 August 1730; Philippsthal
- Died: 7 September 1801 (aged 71); Meiningen
- Spouse: Anton Ulrich, Duke of Saxe-Meiningen (m. 1750; died 1763)
- Issue: Charlotte, Duchess of Saxe-Gotha-Altenburg; Louise, Landgravine of Hesse-Philippsthal-Barchfeld; Princess Elisabeth; Karl Wilhelm, Duke of Saxe-Meiningen; Prince Friedrich Franz; Prince Friedrich Wilhelm; Georg I, Duke of Saxe-Meiningen; Princess Amalie
- House: Hesse
- Father: Charles I, Landgrave of Hesse-Philippsthal
- Mother: Christina of Saxe-Eisenach

Charlotte Amalie of Hesse-Philippsthal (11 August 1730, Philippsthal – 7 September 1801, Meiningen), was Duchess and regent of Saxe-Meiningen from 1763 to 1782.

== Life ==
Charlotte Amalie was a daughter of Landgrave Charles I of Hesse-Philippsthal and his wife, Princess Christine of Saxe-Eisenach. In 1750, when she was 20 years old, she married the 63-year-old Duke Anton Ulrich of Saxe-Meiningen to whom she gave eight children.

The Duke stipulated in his last will and testament that Charlotte Amalie would act as the sole guardian of their sons and regent of Saxe-Meiningen. Anton Ulrich had retired to Frankfurt, away from the family squabbles, and lived there with his family. After her husband's death Charlotte Amalie first travelled to Philippsthal to await an imperial decision confirming her as guardian and regent. Relatives from Gotha travelled to Meiningen in anticipation of the inheritance. After the imperial decision confirmed her as regent and first guardian, she moved to Meiningen.

When she took over the regency in 1763, the state was financially and economically ruined. With strict austerity measures and reforms, economic reconstruction and promotion of spiritual life, she is considered the "saviour of the Duchy". The appointment of new ministers, such as Adolph Gottlieb von Eyben, allowed the government to effectively function again within one year. With her adoption of a sophisticated system of savings and financial analysis at her court Charlotte Amalie attracted the attention of Emperor Joseph II, who appointed her as Director of the Commission to save the even more hopelessly indebted Duchy of Saxe-Hildburghausen.

Since her sons were entitled to rule jointly, she ruled jointly with her eldest son Charles from 1775 to 1782, when George I was still a minor.

Her reign represented the breakthrough of enlightened absolutism in Saxe-Meiningen, and she raised her sons to continue that policy. She founded the masonic lodge Charlotte zu den drei Nelken ("Charlotte and the three carnations"). In accordance with her last wishes, she was not buried in the royal crypt, but in the town cemetery.

== Issue ==
Charlotte Amalie gave birth to:

- Charlotte (1751–1827)

married Duke Ernest II of Saxe-Gotha-Altenburg (1745-1804)

- Louise (1752–1805)

married in 1781 Landgrave Adolph of Hesse-Philippsthal-Barchfeld (1743-1803)

- Elizabeth (1753–1754)
- Charles (1754–1782), Duke of Saxe-Meiningen

married in 1780 Princess Louise of Stolberg-Gedern (1764-1834)

- Frederick Francis (1756–1761)
- Frederick William (1757–1758)
- George I (1761–1803), Duke of Saxe-Meiningen

married in 1782 Princess Louise Eleanore of Hohenlohe-Langenburg (1763-1837)

- Amalie (1762–1798)

married in 1783 Prince Charles Henry Erdmann of Carolath-Beuthen (1759-1817)
