= Anton Ulrich, Duke of Saxe-Meiningen =

Duke of Saxe-Meiningen from 1746 to 1763

Anton Ulrich
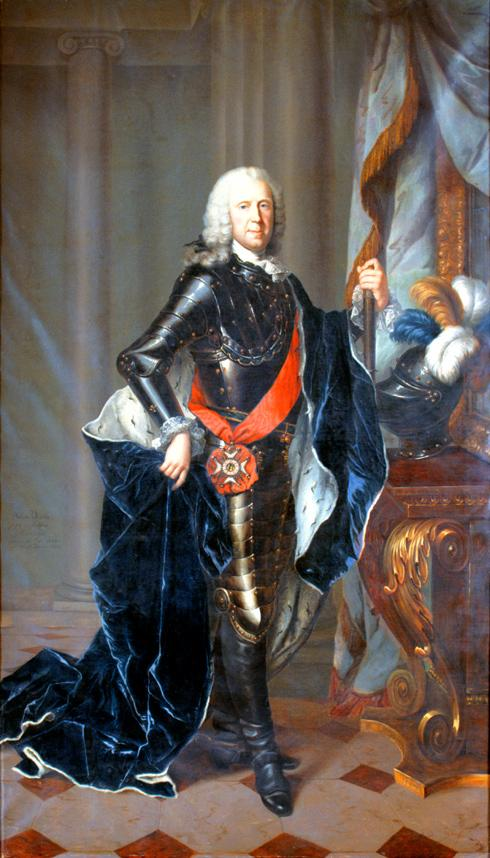
- Portrait, c. 1745

Duke of Saxe-Meiningen
- Reign: 10 March 1746 - 27 January 1763
- Predecessor: Friedrich Wilhelm
- Successor: Karl Wilhelm
- Born: 22 October 1687; Meiningen
- Died: 27 January 1763 (aged 75); Frankfurt
- Spouses: Philippine Elisabeth Caesar (m. 1711; died 1744) Princess Charlotte Amalie of Hesse-Philippsthal (m. 1750)
- Issue: Charlotte, Duchess of Saxe-Gotha-Altenburg; Louise, Landgravine of Hesse-Philippsthal-Barchfeld; Karl Wilhelm, Duke of Saxe-Meiningen; Georg I, Duke of Saxe-Meiningen
- House: Saxe-Meiningen
- Father: Bernhard I, Duke of Saxe-Meiningen
- Mother: Elisabeth Eleonore of Brunswick-Wolfenbüttel
- Religion: Lutheranism

Anton Ulrich (22 October 1687 – 27 January 1763) was Duke of Saxe-Meiningen from 1746 to 1763.

== Life ==
Anton Ulrich was born on 22 October 1687 at Meiningen. He was the second but first surviving son (in order of birth he was the eighth) of Bernhard I, Duke of Saxe-Meiningen and his second wife, Elisabeth Eleonore of Brunswick-Wolfenbüttel.

When his father died in 1706, according to his will the duchy was not supposed to be divided among his heirs. However, due to the lack of a primogeniture rule, his three sons had to govern jointly: Anton Ulrich and his two older half-brothers, Ernst Ludwig and Friedrich Wilhelm. This resulted in conflict between Ernst Ludwig I and Anton Ulrich until the former died in 1724. Chaos continued, though, as now Friedrich Wilhelm and Anton Ulrich issued conflicting decrees.

Anton Ulrich had secretly married morganatically in the Netherlands in 1711 and lived in Amsterdam for much of the time. Since Anton Ulrich's cousin on his mother's side was the wife of Emperor Karl VI he made some progress in his attempts to make his offspring entitled to inherit. After Karl VI died, under Charles VII Anton Ulrich's ten children were found to be disqualified to succeed in 1744. Earlier that year, Philippine Elisabeth Caesar, Anton Ulrich's wife, had died. In 1746, Friedrich Wilhelm died, and Anton Ulrich was now the only Duke of Saxe-Meiningen. Although his relatives at Weimar and Gotha were already discussing the division of Saxe-Meiningen after his death, Anton Ulrich married again and succeeded in fathering another eight children - all of them eligible for inheritance.

Immediately after he inherited the duchy, Anton Ulrich left Meiningen and established his official residence at Frankfurt, where he lived until his death on 27 January 1763.

== Marriages ==
In January 1711, Anton Ulrich secretly married Philippine Elisabeth Caesar, the lady-in-waiting of his favourite sister, Elisabeth Ernestine. This marriage was unequal, but she was created Princess (German: Fürstin) in 1727. They had ten children, all created Prince/Princess of Saxe-Meiningen:

- Princess Philippine Antoinette of Saxe-Meiningen (b.1 August 1712 – d. Meiningen, 21 January 1785) never married or had issue.
- Princess Philippine Elisabeth of Saxe-Meiningen (b. 10 September 1713 – d. Meiningen, 18 March 1781) never married or had issue.
- Princess Philippine Louise of Saxe-Meiningen (b. 10 October 1714 – d. Meiningen, 25 October 1771) never married or had issue.
- Princess Philippine Wilhelmine of Saxe-Meiningen (b. 11 October 1715 – d. 1718) died in infancy.
- Prince Bernhard Ernst of Saxe-Meiningen (b. 14 December 1716 – d. Meiningen, 14 June 1778) never married or had issue.
- Princess Antonie Augusta of Saxe-Meiningen (b. 29 December 1717 – d. Meiningen, 19 September 1768) never married or had issue.
- Princess Sophie Wilhelmine of Saxe-Meiningen (b. 23 February 1719 – d. 24 November 1723) died in infancy.
- Prince Karl Ludwig of Saxe-Meiningen (b. 30 October 1721 – d. May 1727) died in infancy.
- Princess Christine Friederike of Saxe-Meiningen (b. 13 December 1723 – d. 13 December 1723) died at birth.
- Prince Friedrich Ferdinand of Saxe-Meiningen (b. 12 March 1725 – d. 17 June 1725) died in infancy.

In Bad Homburg vor der Höhe on 26 September 1750, Anton Ulrich married Charlotte Amalie of Hesse-Philippsthal, who was forty-three years his junior. They had eight children:

- Princess Marie Charlotte Amalie Ernestine Wilhelmine Philippine of Saxe-Meiningen (b. Frankfurt, 11 September 1751 – d. Genoa, 25 April 1827); married on 21 March 1769 Ernest II, Duke of Saxe-Gotha-Altenburg.
- Princess Wilhelmine Louise Christiane of Saxe-Meiningen (b. Frankfurt, 6 August 1752 – d. Kassel, 3 June 1805), married on 18 October 1781 to Adolph, Landgrave of Hesse-Philippsthal-Barchfeld.
- Princess Elisabeth Sophia Wilhelmine Fredericka of Saxe-Meiningen (b. Frankfurt, 11 September 1753 – d. Frankfurt, 3 February 1754) died in infancy.
- Prince Karl Wilhelm of Saxe-Meiningen (b. Frankfurt, 19 November 1754 – d. Sonneberg, 21 July 1782).
- Prince Friedrich Franz Ernst Ludwig of Saxe-Meiningen (b. Frankfurt, 16 March 1756 – d. Frankfurt, 25 March 1761) died in infancy.
- Prince Friedrich Wilhelm of Saxe-Meiningen (b. Frankfurt, 18 May 1757 – d. Frankfurt, 13 April 1758) died in infancy.
- Georg I, Duke of Saxe-Meiningen (b. Frankfurt, 4 February 1761 – d. Meiningen, 24 December 1803).
- Princess Amalie Auguste Caroline Luise of Saxe-Meiningen (b. Frankfurt, 4 March 1762 – d. Carolath, 28 May 1798); married on 10 February 1783 Henry Charles Erdmann, Prince of Carolath-Beuthen.

== Ancestors ==
Ancestors of Anton Ulrich, Duke of Saxe-Meiningen

8. Johann II, Duke of Saxe-Weimar
4. Ernest I, Duke of Saxe-Gotha
9. Dorothea Maria of Anhalt
2. Bernhard I, Duke of Saxe-Meiningen
10. Johann Philipp, Duke of Saxe-Altenburg
5. Princess Elisabeth Sophie of Saxe-Altenburg
11. Elisabeth of Brunswick-Wolfenbüttel
1. Anton Ulrich, Duke of Saxe-Meiningen
12. Augustus II, Duke of Brunswick
6. Anthony Ulrich, Duke of Brunswick
13. Dorothea of Anhalt-Zerbst
3. Elisabeth Eleonore of Brunswick-Wolfenbüttel
14. Frederick, Duke of Schleswig-Holstein-Sønderburg-Norburg
7. Elizabeth Juliana of Schleswig-Holstein-Sonderburg-Norburg
15. Eleanor of Anhalt-Zerbst

== See also ==
- Altenstein Palace

Anton Ulrich, Duke of Saxe-Meiningen House of Saxe-Meiningen Cadet branch of the House of Wettin Born: 22 October 1687 Died: 27 January 1763
Regnal titles
Preceded by Friedrich Wilhelm	Duke of Saxe-Meiningen; 1746–1763	Succeeded by Karl Wilhelm
