= Adolph, Landgrave of Hesse-Philippsthal-Barchfeld =

Landgrave of Hesse-Philippsthal-Barchfeld from 1777 to 1803

Adolph
- Landgrave of Hesse-Philippsthal-Barchfeld
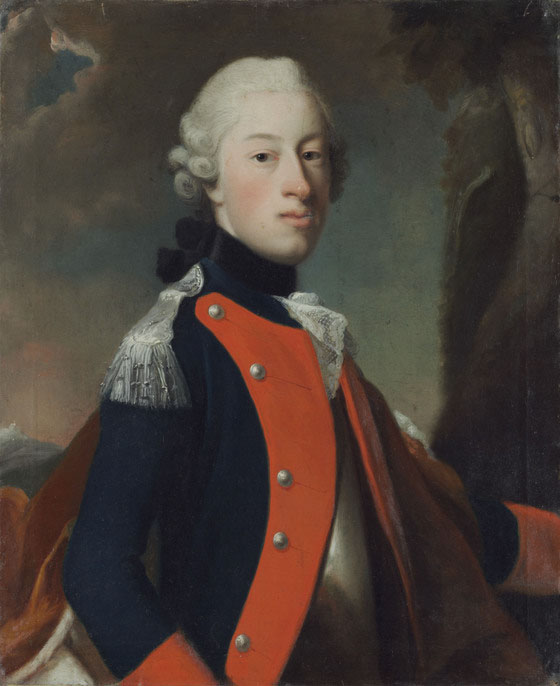
- Portrait, 1768
- Born: 29 June 1743; Ypres
- Died: 17 July 1803 (aged 60); Barchfeld
- Spouse: Princess Louise of Saxe-Meiningen (m. 1781)
- Issue: Charles, Landgrave of Hesse-Philippsthal-Barchfeld; Prince Ernest Frederick
- House: Hesse
- Father: William, Landgrave of Hesse-Philippsthal-Barchfeld
- Mother: Charlotte Wilhelmine of Anhalt-Zeitz-Hoym

Adolph, Landgrave of Hesse-Philippsthal-Barchfeld (29 June 1743 in Ypres – 17 July 1803 in Barchfeld) was a member of the House of Hesse. He was the ruling Landgrave of Hesse-Philippsthal-Barchfeld from 1777 until his death.

== Life ==
Adolph was a son of the Landgrave William of Hesse-Philippsthal-Barchfeld from his marriage with Charlotte Wilhelmine, daughter of Prince Lebrecht of Anhalt-Zeitz-Hoym. Adolph succeeded his childless brother Frederick as Landgrave of Hesse-Philippsthal-Barchfeld in 1777.

He began his career in the service of his Hesse-Kassel. He then went in the Dutch service, where he later became a colonel in the 3rd Infantry Regiment of Orange-Nassau. In 1773, he joined the Prussian army and became chief of the Fusilier Regiment No. 55. Here he gained the favor of Frederick II and on 16 January 1777 he was appointed to Major General. He fought in the Bavarian War of Succession and was attacked by General Wurmser and taken prisoner by the Austrians at Habelschwerdt in 1779. In 1780 he resigned from the military and retired to Barchfeld.

He acquired the Nesselröden estate in 1794 and three years later sold the Wehra property to the Treasury of Hesse-Kassel for 24000Thaler.

== Marriage and issue ==
Landgrave Adolph married on 18 October 1781 in Meiningen with Louise, a daughter of the Duke Anton Ulrich of Sachsen-Meiningen from his marriage with Charlotte Amalie of Hesse-Philippsthal. With her he had the following children:

- Friedrich Carl Wilhelm Ludwig (1782–1783)
- Charles (1784–1854), Landgrave of Hesse-Philippsthal-Barchfeld,

married firstly in 1816 to Princess Auguste of Hohenlohe-Ingelfingen (1793-1821)
married secondly in 1823 to Princess Sophie of Bentheim and Steinfurt (1794-1873)

- William (1786–1834),

married in 1812 to Princess Juliane Sophie of Denmark (1788-1850)

- George (1787–1788)
- Ernest Frederick (1789–1850), never married
- Charlotte (1794-1794)

== Ancestry ==
Ancestors of Adolph, Landgrave of Hesse-Philippsthal-Barchfeld

16. William V, Landgrave of Hesse-Kassel
8. William VI, Landgrave of Hesse-Kassel
17. Amalie Elisabeth of Hanau
4. Philip, Landgrave of Hesse-Philippsthal
18. George William, Elector of Brandenburg
9. Hedwig Sophia of Brandenburg
19. Elizabeth Charlotte of the Palatinate
2. William, Landgrave of Hesse-Philippsthal-Barchfeld
20. Albert Otto II of Solms-Laubach
10. Charles Otto of Solms-Laubach
21. Catharina Juliana of Hanau
5. Catherine Amalie of Solms-Laubach
22. Arnold Jobst of Bentheim
11. Amöne Elisabeth of Bentheim
23. Anna Amalia of Ysenburg
1. Adolph, Landgrave of Hesse-Philippsthal-Barchfeld
24. Christian II, Prince of Anhalt-Bernburg
12. Victor Amadeus, Prince of Anhalt-Bernburg
25. Eleonore Sophie of Schleswig-Holstein-Sonderburg
6. Lebrecht, Prince of Anhalt-Zeitz-Hoym
26. Frederick, Count Palatine of Zweibrücken
13. Countess Palatine Elisabeth of Zweibrücken
27. Anna Juliana of Nassau-Saarbruck
3. Charlotte Wilhelmine of Anhalt-Bernburg-Schaumburg-Hoym
14. John George, Baron of Weede
7. Baroness Eberhardine Jacobine Wilhelmine of Weede
15. Marie of Raesfeldt

Adolph, Landgrave of Hesse-Philippsthal-Barchfeld House of Hesse Born: 29 June 1743 Died: 17 July 1803
Preceded by Frederick	Landgrave of Hesse-Philippsthal-Barchfeld; 1777-1803	Succeeded by Charles
