= Princess Louise of Saxe-Meiningen =

- Landgravine of Hesse-Philippsthal-Barchfeld
- Born: 6 August 1752; Frankfurt
- Died: 3 June 1805 (aged 52); Kassel
- Spouse: Adolph, Landgrave of Hesse-Philippsthal-Barchfeld (m. 1781; died 1803)
- Issue: Charles, Landgrave of Hesse-Philippsthal-Barchfeld; Prince Ernest Frederick
Names
- German: Wilhelmine Luise Christine
- House: Saxe-Meiningen
- Father: Anton Ulrich, Duke of Saxe-Meiningen
- Mother: Charlotte Amalie of Hesse-Philippsthal

Princess Wilhelmina Louise Christine of Saxe-Meiningen (6 August 1752 – 3 June 1805) was a Duchess of Saxe-Meiningen by birth and by marriage Landgravine of Hesse-Philippsthal-Barchfeld.

== Life ==
Louise was a daughter of Duke Anton Ulrich of Sachsen-Meiningen from his second marriage to Charlotte Amalie, daughter of the Landgrave Charles I of Hesse-Philippsthal.

Louise married on 18 October 1781 in Meiningen to Landgrave Adolph of Hesse-Philippsthal-Barchfeld. Even in her marriage contract, which her mother, acting as regent for her brother, Duke Charles William of Saxe-Meiningen, concluded with Landgrave Adolph, it was stipulated that "his future wife is the sole guardian of her underage children and administrator of their assets". After Adolph died in 1803, Louise presented this contract to the Reichskammergericht and this court confirmed her guardianship over her three sons.

== Issue ==
From her marriage Louise had the following children:

- Frederick (1782–1783)
- Charles (1784–1854), Landgrave of Hesse-Philippsthal-Barchfeld, married
  1. in 1816 to Princess Auguste of Hohenlohe-Ingelfingen (1793–1821)
  2. in 1823 to Princess Sophie of Bentheim and Steinfurt (1794–1873)
- William (1786–1834), married in 1812 Princess Juliane Sophie of Denmark (1788–1850)
- George (1787–1788)
- Ernest Frederick (1789–1850); never married
- Charlotte (1794)
