= Charles Paul Ernest, Count of Bentheim-Steinfurt =

German nobleman (1729–1780)

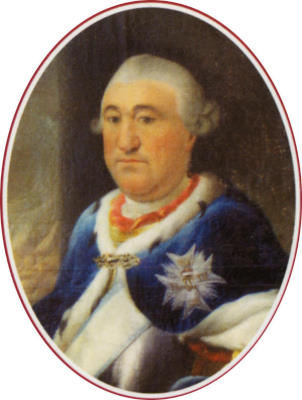
- Contemporary portrait of Charles Paul Ernest
- Born: 30 August 1729
- Died: 30 June 1780 (aged 50)
- Noble family: Bentheim-Steinfurt
- Spouse: Charlotte Sophia Louise of Nassau-Siegen
- Father: Frederick of Bentheim-Steinfurt
- Mother: Francisca Charlotte of Lippe

Charles Paul Ernest of Bentheim-Steinfurt (30 August 1729 – 30 June 1780) was a Count of Steinfurt.

He was the son of the reigning Count Frederick of Bentheim and Steinfurt (1703–1733) and his wife Countess Franziska Charlotte of Lippe-Detmold (1704–1738). His father died young and Charles Paul Ernest became Head of the Bentheim-Steinfurt family in 1733. Initially, he had to share power in the territories of Steinfurt and Alpen with his great-uncle Statius Philip (1668–1749). Under the guardianship of his great-uncle, he enjoyed an excellent education. His Hofmeister Johann Christoph Buch accompanied him on several long journeys to perfect his foreign language skills.

In 1748, he married Princess Charlotte Sophia Louise of Nassau-Siegen, the eldest daughter of Frederick William II, Prince of Nassau-Siegen (1706–1734) and Countess Sophie Polyxena Concordia of Sayn-Wittgenstein-Hohenstein (1709–1781). In 1749, his great-uncle and regent Statius Philip died, and Charles Paul Ernest took up the business of government. At times, he lived in Paris, where he became acquainted with Voltaire.

Charles Paul Ernest had a strong interest in history and collected rare books, incunables, manuscripts, images, coins and natural history curiosities. In 1765, he began creating the Steinfurter Bagno Park. He had the welfare of his subjects at heart; his subjects liked and revered him.

In 1770, he joined the Palatinate Academy of Sciences in Mannheim. His youngest daughter, Caroline of Bentheim-Steinfurt was active as a writer.

Charles Paul Ernest died on 30 June 1780 and was succeeded by his son who became Prince Louis William Geldricus Ernest of Bentheim and Steinfurt (1756–1817), who was described as highly educated, intellectual and interested in scientific and economical issues.
