= Louis William Geldricus Ernest, Prince of Bentheim and Steinfurt =

Louis William Geldricus Ernest of Bentheim and Steinfurt
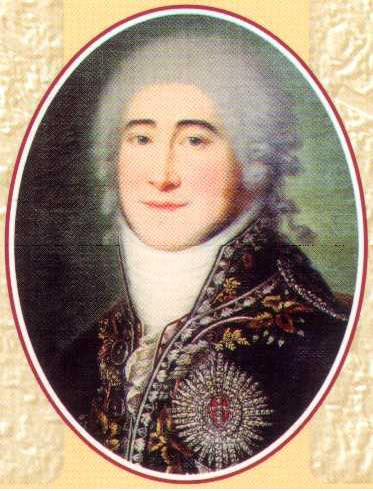
- Born: 1 October 1756; Steinfurt Castle in Steinfurt
- Died: 20 August 1817 (aged 60)
- Noble family: Bentheim-Steinfurt
- Spouse: Juliane Wilhelmine of Schleswig-Holstein-Sonderburg-Glücksburg (m. 1776)
- Issue: Henriette Sophie; Christian; Alexius, Prince of Bentheim and Steinfurt; William; Louis; Charlotte; Eugene; Sophie
- Father: Charles Paul Ernest, Count of Bentheim-Steinfurt
- Mother: Sophie Charlotte of Nassau-Siegen

Louis William Geldricus Ernest of Bentheim and Steinfurt (1 October 1756 at Steinfurt Castle – 20 August 1817) was a ruling count and by birth member of the House of Bentheim-Steinfurt.

== Early life ==
He was born as the second son of Count Charles Paul Ernest, Count of Bentheim-Steinfurt and his wife, Princess Sophie Charlotte of Nassau-Siegen (1729-1759), the eldest daughter of Frederick William II, Prince of Nassau-Siegen.

== Reign ==
As his brother Charles (13 February 1753 – 5 September 1772) died before their father, Louis succeeded in 1780 as reigning Count of Steinfurt. He was an Imperial Count and was raised to the rank of Prince on 21 January 1817 by King Frederick William III.

== Marriage and issue ==
On 17 July 1776, he married Princess Juliane Wilhelmine of Schleswig-Holstein-Sonderburg-Glücksburg (30 April 1754 – 14 September 1823), with whom he had the following eight children:

- Henriette Sophie (10 June 1777 – 8 December 1851), married in 1802 to Karl, 2nd Prince of Solms-Hohensolms-Lich (1762–1807)
- Christian (1778–1789)
- Alexius (20 October 1781 – 3 November 1866), Louis's successor as Prince of Bentheim und Steinfurt
- William (17 April 1782 – 12 October 1839)
- Louis (22 November 1787 – 4 February 1876)
- Charlotte (5 May 1789 – 6 January 1874)
- Eugene (28 March 1791 – 4 December 1871)
- Sophie (16 January 1794 – 6 May 1873), married on 10 September 1823 to Landgrave Charles of Hesse-Philippsthal-Barchfeld (27 June 1784 – 17 July 1854)
