= List of Hessian royal consorts =

Standard of the Grand Duchess of Hesse

This is a list of the Landgravine, Electress and Grand Duchess of Hesse, the consorts of the Landgrave of Hesse and its successor states; and finally of the Electors and Grand Dukes of Hesse.

== Hesse ==
=== Landgravine of Hesse (1264–1567) ===
Picture	Name	Father	Birth	Marriage	Became Landgravine	Ceased to be Landgravine	Death	Husband
	Adelheid of Brunswick	Otto I, Duke of Brunswick-Lüneburg (Welf)	1244	before 26 March 1263	1264 husband's ascession	12 June 1274		Henry I
	Mechthild of Cleves	Dietrich VI, Count of Cleves (Cleves)	–	before 26 February 1276		21 December 1308 husband's death	21 December 1309	Henry I
	Adelheid of Ravensberg	Otto III, Count of Ravensberg (Ravensberg)	–	1297	21 December 1308 husband's ascession	17 January 1328 husband's death	after 3 April 1338	Otto I
	Adelheid of Brunswick	Albert II, Duke of Brunswick-Lüneburg (Welf)	25 March 1290	July 1306	21 December 1308 husband's ascession	16/22 February 1311 husband's death	14 February/2 October 1311	John of Lower Hesse
	Elisabeth of Thuringia	Frederick I, Landgrave of Thuringia (Wettin)	1306	3 February 1318 or 25 September 1320	17 January 1328 husband's ascession	before 1340 divorce	1368, before 10 November	Henry II
	Joanna of Nassau-Weilburg	John I, Count of Nassau-Weilburg (Nassau)	1362	30 January/11 February 1377		1 January 1383		Hermann II
	Margaret of Hohenzollern-Nuremberg	Frederick V, Burgrave of Nuremberg (Hohenzollern)	1363	15 October 1383		15 January 1406		Hermann II
	Anna of Saxony	Frederick I, Elector of Saxony (Wettin)	5 June 1420	13 September 1436		17 January 1458 husband's death	17 September 1462	Louis I

=== Lower Hesse (Kassel) ===
Picture	Name	Father	Birth	Marriage	Became Landgravine	Ceased to be Landgravine	Death	Husband
	Mechthild of Württemberg	Ludwig I, Count of Württemberg-Urach (Württemberg)	1436	18 August 1454		8 November 1471 husband's death	6 June 1495	Louis II
	Anna of Brunswick	William IV, Duke of Brunswick-Lüneburg (Welf)	1460	17 February 1488		3 June 1493 husband's abdication	16 May 1520	William I
	Yolande of Vaudémont	Frederick II of Vaudémont (Lorraine)	–	9 November 1497		21 May 1500		William II
	Anna of Mecklenburg-Schwerin	Magnus II, Duke of Mecklenburg (Mecklenburg)	14 September 1485	20 October 1500		11 July 1509 husband's death	12 May 1525	William II

=== Upper Hesse (Marburg) ===
The only Landgravine of Upper Hesse was Anna of Katzenelnbogen (1443–1494) who married Henry III in 1458. One could say that Anna of Brunswick was a Landgravine of Upper Hesse when it was united with Lower Hesse after 1500.

=== Landgravine of Hesse (1500–1567) ===
Picture	Name	Father	Birth	Marriage	Became Landgravine	Ceased to be Landgravine	Death	Husband
	Christine of Saxony	George, Duke of Saxony (Wettin)	25 December 1505	11 December 1523		15 April 1549		Philip I

== Hesse-Kassel ==
=== Landgravine of Hesse-Kassel (1567–1803) ===
Picture	Name	Father	Birth	Marriage	Became Landgravine	Ceased to be Landgravine	Death	Husband
	Sabine of Württemberg	Christoph, Duke of Württemberg (Württemberg)	2 July 1549	11 February 1566	31 March 1567 husband's accession	17 August 1582		William IV
	Agnes of Solms-Laubach	John George, Count of Solms-Laubach (Solms-Laubach)	7 January 1578	23 September 1593		23 November 1602		Maurice
	Juliane of Nassau-Siegen	John VII, Count of Nassau-Siegen (Nassau-Siegen)	3 September 1587	22 May 1603		1627 husband's abdication	15 February 1643	Maurice
	Amalie Elisabeth of Hanau-Münzenberg	Philip Louis II, Count of Hanau-Münzenberg (Hanau)	29 January 1602	21 September 1619	1627 husband's accession	21 September 1637 husband's death	18 August 1651	William V
	Hedwig Sophie of Brandenburg	George William, Elector of Brandenburg (Hohenzollern)	14 July 1623	9/19 July 1649		16 July 1663 husband's death	26 June 1683	William VI
	Maria Amalia of Courland	Jacob Kettler, Duke of Courland (Kettler)	12 June 1653	21 May 1673		16 June 1711		Charles I
	Ulrika Eleonora of Sweden	Charles XI of Sweden (Palatinate-Zweibrücken)	23 January 1688	4/15 May 1715	23 March 1730 husband's accession	24 November 1741		Frederick I
	Mary of Great Britain	George II of Great Britain (Hanover)	5 March 1723	28 June 1740	1 February 1760 husband's accession	14 January 1772		Frederick II
	Philippine of Brandenburg-Schwedt	Frederick William, Margrave of Brandenburg-Schwedt (Hohenzollern)	10 October 1745	10 January 1773		31 October 1785 husband's death	1 May 1800	Frederick II
	Wilhelmina Caroline of Denmark	Frederick V of Denmark (Oldenburg)	10 July 1747	1 September 1764	31 October 1785 husband's accession	15 May 1803 raised to Electress	14 January 1820	William IX

=== Landgravine of Hesse-Rotenburg (1627–1834) ===
Picture	Name	Father	Birth	Marriage	Became Landgravine	Ceased to be Landgravine	Death	Husband
	Sophie Juliane of Waldeck	Christian, Count of Waldeck-Wildungen (Waldeck-Wildungen)	1 April 1607	31 December 1633		15 September 1637		Herman IV
	Kunigunde Juliane of Anhalt-Dessau	John George I, Prince of Anhalt-Dessau (Ascania)	17 February 1608	2 January 1642		25 March 1658 husband's death	26 September 1683	Herman IV
	Eleonora of Solms-Lich	Philip I, Count of Solms-Lich-Hohensolms (Solms-Lich-Hohensolms)	6 December 1632	1647	25 March 1658 husband's accession	2 August 1689		Ernest
	Eleonore of Löwenstein-Wertheim	Maximilian Karl Albert, Prince of Löwenstein-Wertheim-Rochefort (Löwenstein-Wertheim)	16 February 1686	9 November 1704	20 November 1725 husband's ascession	29 November 1749 husband's death	22 February 1753	Ernest Leopold
	Sophia of Starhemberg	Conrad Sigismund, Count of Starhemberg (Starhemberg)	17/28 October 1722	25 August 1745	29 November 1749 husband's ascession	12 December 1773		Constantine
	Jeanne of Bombelles	Joseph Henri, Comte de Bombelles, Baron de la Motte-Saint-Lié (Bombelles)	22 October 1751	27 May 1775		30 December 1778 husband's death	28 November 1822	Constantine
	Leopoldine of Liechtenstein	Franz Joseph I, Prince of Liechtenstein (Liechtenstein)	30 January 1754	1 September 1771	30 December 1778 husband's accession	23 March 1812 husband's death	16 October 1823	Charles Emmanuel
	Elisabeth of Hohenlohe-Langenburg	Karl Ludwig, Prince of Hohenlohe-Langenburg (Hohenlohe-Langenburg)	22 November 1790	10 September 1812		6 October 1830		Victor Amadeus
	Eleonora of Salm-Reifferscheidt-Krautheim	Franz, Prince of Salm-Reifferscheidt-Krautheim (Salm-Reifferscheidt-Krautheim)	13 July 1799	19 November 1831		12 November 1834 husband's death	10 November 1851	Victor Amadeus

=== Landgravine of Hesse-Eschwege (1627–1667) ===
Picture	Name	Father	Birth	Marriage	Became Landgravine	Ceased to be Landgravine	Death	Husband
	Eleonora Catherine of the Palatinate-Zweibrücken	John Casimir, Count Palatine of Kleeburg (Palatinate-Zweibrücken)	17 May 1626	8 September 1646		24 September 1655 husband's death	3 March 1692	Frederick (Hesse-Eschwege)
	Eleonora of Solms-Lich	Philip I, Count of Solms-Lich-Hohensolms (Solms-Lich-Hohensolms)	6 December 1632	1647	24 September 1655 husband's accession	1667 ?	2 August 1689	Ernest
Name is eventually changed to Hesse-Wanfried.

=== Landgravine of Hesse-Rheinfels (1627–1658) ===
Picture	Name	Father	Birth	Marriage	Became Landgravine	Ceased to be Landgravine	Death	Husband
	Eleonora of Solms-Lich	Philip I, Count of Solms-Lich-Hohensolms (Solms-Lich-Hohensolms)	6 December 1632	1647		25 March 1658; Inherits Rotenburg	2 August 1689	Ernest

=== Landgravine of Hesse-Wanfried (1676–1755) ===
Picture	Name	Father	Birth	Marriage	Became Landgravine	Ceased to be Landgravine	Death	Husband
	Sophie Magdalene of Salm-Reifferscheid	Erich Adolf, Count of Salm-Reifferscheid (Salm-Reifferscheid)	17 June 1649	24 January 1669	1676; Wanfried created	4/14 April 1675		Charles
	Juliane Alexandrine of Leiningen-Heidesheim	Emich XII, Count of Leiningen-Heidesheim (Leiningen-Heidesheim)	21 August 1651	4 June 1678		19 April 1703		Charles
	Ernestine of the Palatinate-Sulzbach	Theodore Eustace, Count Palatine of Sulzbach (Wittelsbach)	15 May 1697	19 September 1719		1 April 1731 husband's death	14 April 1775	William
	Marie Franziska of Hohenlohe-Bartenstein	Philipp Carl Caspar, Count of Hohenlohe-Bartenstein (Hohenlohe-Bartenstein)	17 August 1698	11 August 1731		21 October 1755 husband's death	11 December 1757	Christian

=== Landgravine of Hesse-Philippsthal (1663–1866) ===
Picture	Name	Father	Birth	Marriage	Became Landgravine	Ceased to be Landgravine	Death	Husband
	Catherine Amalie of Solms-Laubach	Charles Otto, Count of Solms-Laubach (Solms-Laubach)	26 September 1654	16 April 1680		18 June 1721 husband's death	26 April 1736	Philip
	Caroline of Saxe-Eisenach	John William III, Duke of Saxe-Eisenach (Wettin)	15 April 1699	24 November 1725		25 July 1743		Charles I
	Ulrike Eleonore of Hesse-Philippsthal-Barchfeld	William, Landgrave of Hesse-Philippsthal-Barchfeld (Hesse)	27 April 1732	22 June 1755	8 May 1770 husband's accession	2 February 1795		William
	Caroline of Hesse-Philippsthal	Charles, Hereditary Prince of Hesse-Philippsthal (Hesse)	10 February 1793	17 February 1812	16 February 1816 husband's accession	25 December 1849 husband's death	9 February 1869	Ernest Constantine
	Marie of Württemberg	Duke Eugen of Württemberg (Württemberg)	25 March 1818	9 October 1845	25 December 1849 husband's accession	1866 landgraviate annexed to Prussia	10 April 1888	Charles II

=== Landgravine of Hesse-Philippsthal-Barchfeld (1721–1866) ===
Picture	Name	Father	Birth	Marriage	Became Landgravine	Ceased to be Landgravine	Death	Husband
	Charlotte of Anhalt-Bernburg	Lebrecht, Prince of Anhalt-Zeitz-Hoym (Ascania)	24 November 1704	31 October 1724		13 May 1761 husband's death	11 November 1766	William
	Sophie Henrietta of Salm-Grumbach	Karl Walrad Wilhelm, Count of Salm-Grumbach (Salm-Grumbach)	1740	15 January 1772		1772 husband's lost title	20 February 1800	Frederick
	Louise of Saxe-Meiningen	Anton Ulrich, Duke of Saxe-Meiningen (Wettin)	6 August 1752	18 October 1781		17 July 1803 husband's death	3 June 1805	Adolf
	Auguste of Hohenlohe-Ingelfingen	Frederick Louis, Prince of Hohenlohe-Ingelfingen (Hohenlohe-Ingelfingen)	16 November 1793	19 July 1816		8 June 1821		Charles
	Sophie of Bentheim and Steinfurt	Ludwig Wilhelm, Prince of Bentheim and Steinfurt (Bentheim-Steinfurt)	6 January 1794	10 September 1823		17 July 1854 husband's death	6 May 1873	Charles
	Louise of Prussia	Prince Charles of Prussia (Hohenzollern)	1 March 1829	27 June 1854	17 July 1854 husband's accession	1861 divorce	10 May 1901	Alexis

== Hesse-Marburg ==
=== Landgravines of Hesse-Marburg (1567–1604) ===
Picture	Name	Father	Birth	Marriage	Became Landgravine	Ceased to be Landgravine	Death	Husband
	Hedwig of Württemberg	Christoph, Duke of Württemberg (Württemberg)	15 January 1547	10 May 1563	31 March 1567 husband's accession	4 March 1590		Louis IV
	Marie of Mansfeld-Hinterort	John I, Count of Mansfeld-Hinterort (Mansfeld-Hinterort)	3 March 1567	4 July 1591		9 October 1604 husband's death	1625 or 1635	Louis IV

== Hesse-Rheinfels ==
=== Landgravines of Hesse-Rheinfels (1567–1583) ===
Picture	Name	Father	Birth	Marriage	Became Landgravine	Ceased to be Landgravine	Death	Husband
	Anna Elisabeth of the Palatinate	Frederick III, Elector Palatine (Wittelsbach)	23 July 1549	18 January 1569		30 November 1583 husband's death	20 September 1609	Philip II

== Hesse-Darmstadt ==
=== Landgravine of Hesse-Darmstadt (1567–1806) ===
Picture	Name	Father	Birth	Marriage	Became Landgravine	Ceased to be Landgravine	Death	Husband
	Magdalene of Lippe	Bernhard VIII, Count of Lippe (Lippe)	24 February 1552	17 August 1572		26 February 1587		George I
	Eleonore of Württemberg	Christoph, Duke of Württemberg (Württemberg)	22 March 1552	25 May 1589		7 February 1596 husband's death	12 January 1618	George I
	Magdalene of Brandenburg	John George, Elector of Brandenburg (Hohenzollern)	7 January 1582	5/14 June 1598		4 May 1616		Louis V
	Sophia Eleonore of Saxony	John George I, Elector of Saxony (Wettin)	23 November 1609	1 April 1627		11 June 1661 husband's death	2 June 1671	George II
	Maria Elisabeth of Holstein-Gottorp	Frederick III, Duke of Holstein-Gottorp (Holstein-Gottorp)	6 June 1634	24 November 1650	11 June 1661 husband's accession	17 June 1665		Louis VI
	Elisabeth Dorothea of Saxe-Gotha-Altenburg	Ernest II, Duke of Saxe-Gotha (Wettin)	8 January 1640	5 December 1666		24 April 1678 husband's death	24 August 1709	Louis VI
	Dorothea Charlotte of Brandenburg-Ansbach	Albert II, Margrave of Brandenburg-Ansbach (Hohenzollern)	28 November 1661	1 December 1687		15 November 1705		Ernest Louis
	Caroline of the Palatinate-Zweibrücken	Christian III, Count Palatine of Zweibrücken (Palatinate-Zweibrücken)	9 March 1721	12 August 1741	17 October 1768 husband's accession	30 March 1774		Louis IX
	Louise of Hesse-Darmstadt	Prince George William of Hesse-Darmstadt (Hesse-Darmstadt)	15 February 1761	19 February 1777	6 April 1790 husband's accession	13 August 1806 raised to Grand Duchess	24 October 1829	Louis X

=== Landgravine of Hesse-Butzbach (1609–1643) ===
Picture	Name	Father	Birth	Marriage	Became Landgravine	Ceased to be Landgravine	Death	Husband
	Anna Margaretha of Diepholz	Friedrich II, Count of Diepholz (Diepholz)	22 July 1580	29 July 1610		9 August 1629		Philip III
	Christina Sophia of East Frisia	Enno III, Count of East Frisia (Cirksena)	26 September 1609	2 June 1632		28 April 1643 husband's death	20 March 1658	Philip III

=== Landgravine of Hesse-Homburg (1622–1866) ===
Picture	Name	Father	Birth	Marriage	Became Landgravine	Ceased to be Landgravine	Death	Husband
	Margarete Elisabeth of Leiningen-Westerburg	Christoph, Count of Leiningen-Westerburg (Leiningen)	30 June 1604	10 August 1622		9 May 1638 husband's death	13 August 1667	Frederick I
	Sophia Eleonora of Hesse-Darmstadt	George II, Landgrave of Hesse-Darmstadt (Hesse)	7 January 1634	21 April 1650		7 October 1663		William Christoph
	Anna-Elisabetha of Saxe-Lauenburg	Augustus, Duke of Saxe-Lauenburg (Ascania)	23 August 1624	2 April 1665		1669 husband sold title but retained Bingenheim	27 May 1688	William Christoph
	Anna Catherine of Pogwitsch	Welf Pogwisch zu Farve (Pogwisch)	1633/8	11 October 1666	1669 husband purchased the Landgraviate	1671 mortgaged the Landgraviate to two merchants and later Hesse-Darmstadt	18 May 1694	George Christian
	Louise Elisabeth of Courland	Jacob Kettler, Duke of Courland (Kettler)	12 August 1646	23 October/2 November 1670	1679 husband redeemed the Landgraviate	16 December 1690		Frederick II
	Sophie Sybille of Leiningen-Westerburg	Christoph, Count of Leiningen-Westerburg (Leiningen)	14 June 1656	15 November 1691		24 January 1708 husband's death	13 April 1724	Frederick II
	Elisabeth Dorothea of Hesse-Darmstadt	Louis VI, Landgrave of Hesse-Darmstadt (Hesse)	24 April 1676	14/24 February 1700	24 January 1708 husband's accession	9 September 1721		Frederick III
	Christiane Charlotte of Nassau-Ottweiler	Friedrich Ludwig, Count of Nassau-Ottweiler (Nassau)	2 September 1685	17 October 1728		8 June 1746 husband's death	6 November 1761	Frederick III
	Ulrike Louise of Solms-Braunfels	Frederick William, Prince of Solms-Braunfels (Solms-Braunfels)	1 May 1731	10 October 1746		7 February 1751 husband's death	12 September 1792	Frederick IV
	Caroline of Hesse-Darmstadt	Louis IX, Landgrave of Hesse-Darmstadt (Hesse)	2 March 1746	27 September 1768		20 January 1820 husband's death	18 September 1821	Frederick V
	Elizabeth of the United Kingdom	George III of the United Kingdom (Hanover)	22 May 1770	7 April 1818	20 January 1820 husband's accession	2 April 1829 husband's death	10 January 1840	Frederick VI
	Louise Fredericka of Anhalt-Dessau	Frederick, Hereditary Prince of Anhalt-Dessau (Ascania)	1 March 1798	12 February 1818	15 December 1846 husband's accession	8 September 1848 husband's death	11 June 1858	Gustav

=== Landgravine of Hesse-Braubach (1625–1651) ===
Picture	Name	Father	Birth	Marriage	Became Landgravine	Ceased to be Landgravine	Death	Husband
	Johannetta of Sayn-Wittgenstein	Ernest, Count of Sayn-Wittgenstein (Sayn-Wittgenstein)	27 August 1626	30 September 1647		1 April 1651 husband's death	28 September 1701	John of Hesse-Braubach

=== Landgravine of Hesse-Itter (1661–1676) ===
Picture	Name	Father	Birth	Marriage	Became Landgravine	Ceased to be Landgravine	Death	Husband
	Dorothea Auguste of Schleswig-Holstein-Sonderburg-Franzhagen	John Christian, Duke of Schleswig-Holstein-Sonderburg-Franzhagen (Schleswig-Holstein-Sonderburg-Franzhagen)	30 September 1636	5 March 1661	11 June 1661 husband's accession	18 September 1662		George III
	Juliane Alexandrine of Leiningen-Heidesheim	Emich XIII, Count of Leiningen-Heidesheim (Leiningen-Heidesheim)	21 August 1651	21 July 1667		19 July 1676 husband's death	1 April 1703	George III

== Electorate of Hesse ==
=== Electress of Hesse (1803–1866) ===
Picture	Name	Father	Birth	Marriage	Became Electress	Ceased to be Electress	Death	Husband
	Wilhelmina Caroline of Denmark	Frederick V of Denmark (Oldenburg)	10 July 1747	1 September 1764	15 May 1803 raised to Electress	14 January 1820		William I
	Augusta of Prussia	Frederick William II of Prussia (Hohenzollern)	1 May 1780	13 February 1797	27 February 1821 husband accession	19 February 1841		William II

== Grand Duchy of Hesse ==
=== Grand Duchess of Hesse and by Rhine (1806–1918) ===
Picture	Name	Father	Birth	Marriage	Became Grand Duchess	Ceased to be Grand Duchess	Death	Husband
	Louise of Hesse-Darmstadt	Prince George William of Hesse-Darmstadt (Hesse-Darmstadt)	15 February 1761	19 February 1777	13 August 1806 raised to Grand Duchess	24 October 1829		Louis I
	Wilhelmine of Baden	Charles Louis, Hereditary Prince of Baden (Zähringen)	21 September 1788	19 June 1804	16 April 1830 husband accession	27 January 1836		Louis II
	Mathilde Caroline of Bavaria	Louis I of Bavaria (Wittelsbach)	30 August 1813	26 December 1833	16 June 1848 husband accession	25 May 1862		Louis III
	Alice of the United Kingdom	Prince Albert of Saxe-Coburg and Gotha (Saxe-Coburg and Gotha)	25 April 1843	1 July 1862	13 June 1877 husband accession	14 December 1878		Louis IV
	Victoria Melita of Edinburgh	Alfred, Duke of Saxe-Coburg and Gotha (Saxe-Coburg and Gotha)	25 November 1876	9 April 1894		21 December 1901 divorce	1 March 1936	Ernest Louis
	Eleonore of Solms-Hohensolms-Lich	Hermann, Prince of Solms-Hohensolms-Lich (Solms-Hohensolms-Lich)	17 September 1871	2 February 1905		9 November 1918 husband's abdication	16 November 1937	Ernest Louis

== See also ==
- List of rulers of Hesse
