= Charles II of Hesse-Philippsthal =

- Born: 22 May 1803; Philippsthal
- Died: 12 February 1868 (aged 64); Philippsthal
- Spouse: Marie of Württemberg (m. 1845)
- Issue: Ernest, Landgrave of Hesse-Philippsthal
- House: House of Hesse
- Father: Ernest Constantine, Landgrave of Hesse-Philipptshal
- Mother: Louise of Schwarzburg-Rudolstadt

Charles II of Hesse-Philippsthal (22 May 1803 in Philippsthal – 12 February 1868 in Philippsthal) was a member of the House of Hesse and was Landgrave of Hesse-Philippsthal from 1849 until 1866.

== Life ==
Charles was a son of Landgrave Ernest Constantine of Hesse-Philippsthal (1771–1849) from his marriage to Louise (1775–1808), daughter of Prince Charles Frederick of Schwarzburg-Rudolstadt.

Charles succeeded his father as the Landgrave of Hesse-Philippsthal in 1849, after his older brother Ferdinand had died in 1839. Charles served as a Major General à la suite in the army of the Electorate of Hesse. After the War of 1866, Prussia annexed, among others, the Electorate of Hesse and Hesse-Philippsthal.

== Marriage and issue ==
Charles married on 9 October 1845 in Pokój with Marie (1818–1888), a daughter of Duke Eugen of Württemberg (1788–1857), with whom he had two children:

- Ernest (1846–1925), Landgrave of Hesse-Philippsthal
- Charles (1853–1916)

== Ancestors ==
Ancestors of Charles II of Hesse-Philippsthal

16. Philip, Landgrave of Hesse-Philippsthal
8. Charles I, Landgrave of Hesse-Philippsthal
17. Catherine Amalie of Solms-Laubach
4. William, Landgrave of Hesse-Philippsthal
18. John William III, Duke of Saxe-Eisenach
9. Caroline Christine of Saxe-Eisenach
19. Christine Juliane of Baden-Durlach
2. Ernest Constantine, Landgrave of Hesse-Philipptshal
20. Philip, Landgrave of Hesse-Philippsthal (= 16)
10. William, Landgrave of Hesse-Philippsthal-Barchfeld
21. Catherine Amalie of Solms-Laubach (= 17)
5. Ulrika Eleonora of Hesse-Philippsthal-Barchfeld
22. Lebrecht, Prince of Anhalt-Zeitz-Hoym
11. Charlotte Wilhelmine of Anhalt-Bernburg-Schaumburg-Hoym
23. Eberhardine of Weede
1. Charles II, Landgrave of Hesse-Philippsthal
24. Louis Frederick I, Prince of Schwarzburg-Rudolstadt
12. Louis Günther II, Prince of Schwarzburg-Rudolstadt
25. Anna Sophie of Saxe-Gotha-Altenburg
6. Frederick Charles, Prince of Schwarzburg-Rudolstadt
26. Henry XIII, Count of Reuss-Untergreiz
13. Sophie Henriette of Reuss-Untergreiz
27. Sophie Elisabeth of Stolberg-Wernigerode
3. Louise of Schwarzburg-Rudolstadt
28. Frederick Anton, Prince of Schwarzburg-Rudolstadt
14. John Frederick, Prince of Schwarzburg-Rudolstadt
29. Sophia Wilhelmina of Saxe-Coburg-Saalfeld
7. Friederike Sophie Auguste of Schwarzburg-Rudolstadt
30. Ernest Augustus I, Duke of Saxe-Weimar-Eisenach
15. Bernardina Christina Sophia of Saxe-Weimar-Eisenach
31. Eleonore Wilhelmine of Anhalt-Köthen

Charles II of Hesse-Philippsthal House of Hesse Born: 22 May 1803 Died: 12 February 1868
Regnal titles
| Preceded by Ernest Constantine | Landgrave of Hesse-Philippsthal; 1849–1866 | Hesse-Philippsthal annexed by Prussia |
Titles in pretence
| Loss of title Hesse-Kassel annexed by Prussia | — TITULAR — Landgrave of Hesse-Philippsthal; 1866–1868 | Succeeded by Ernest |
