= Princess Juliane of Hesse-Philippsthal =

Countess of Schaumburg-Lippe (1761–1799)

Landgravine Juliane of Hesse-Philippsthal
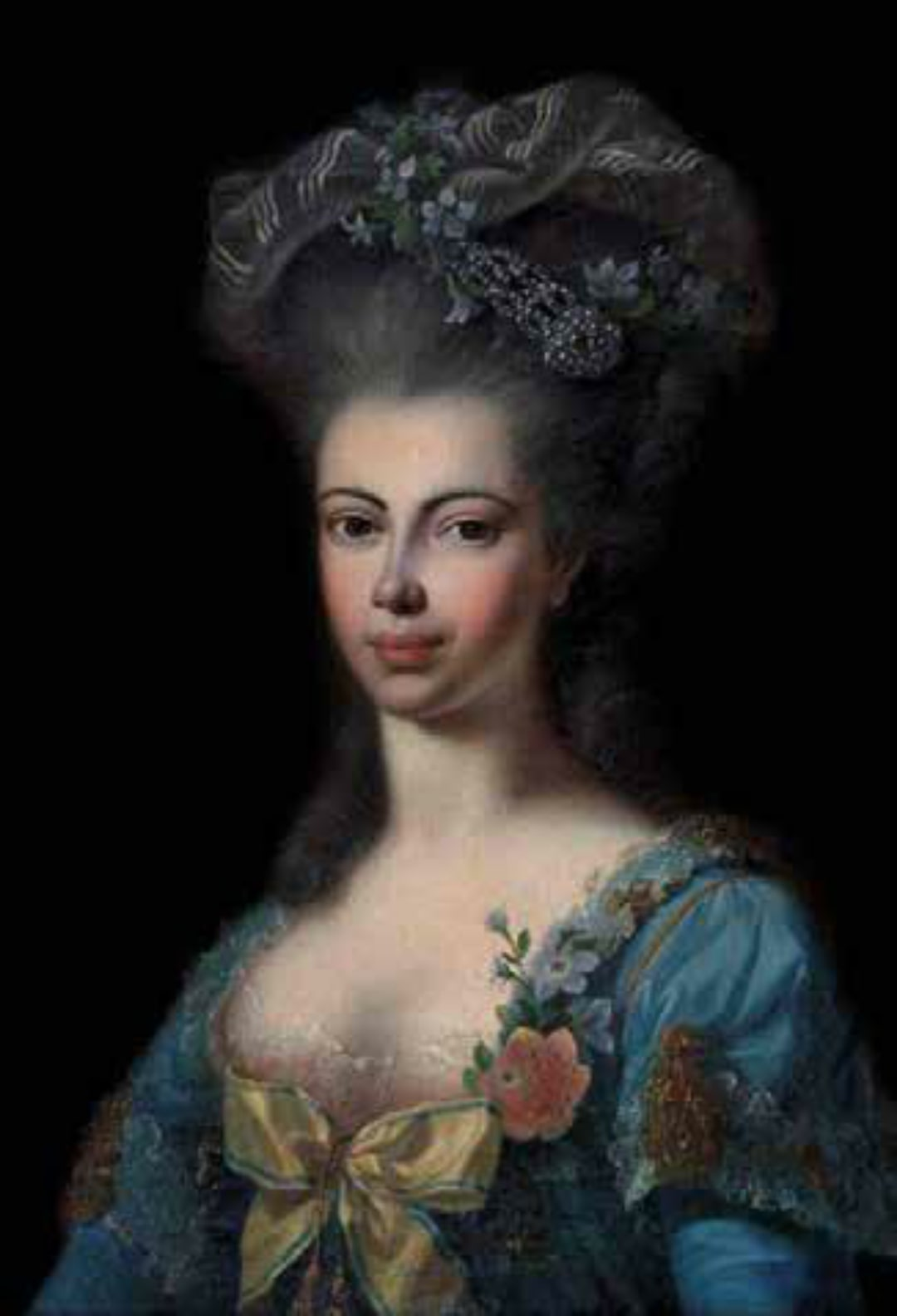
- Portrait of Juliane c. 1780
- Born: 8 June 1761; Zutphen
- Died: 9 November 1799 (aged 38); Bückeburg
- Spouse: Philip II, Count of Schaumburg-Lippe (m. 1780; died 1787)
- Issue: George William, Prince of Schaumburg-Lippe
- House: Hesse
- Father: William, Landgrave of Hesse-Philippsthal
- Mother: Ulrike Eleonore of Hesse-Philippsthal-Barchfeld

Juliane of Hesse-Philippsthal (8 June 1761 – 9 November 1799), was a Countess of Schaumburg-Lippe, married in 1780 to Count Philip II, Count of Schaumburg-Lippe. She served as the regent of Schaumburg-Lippe during the minority of her son from 1787 to 1799.

== Life ==
Juliane was the daughter of Landgrave William of Hesse-Philippsthal (1726–1810) and his wife Ulrike Eleonore, Landgravine of Hesse-Philippsthal-Barchfeld (1732–1795). She spent some of her youth in 's-Hertogenbosch, where her father served as a Dutch general. She received a German education.

On 10 October 1780 she married in Philippsthal to Count Philip Ernest of Schaumburg-Lippe. Philipp Ernst, who was 57 years old at the time and already a widower, died after only seven years of marriage. Countess Juliane took up government, together with Count Johann Ludwig, Reichsgraf von Wallmoden-Gimborn as regent for her minor son George William.

Immediately afterwards, Landgrave William of Hesse-Kassel occupied Schaumburg-Lippe militarily, arguing it was a fief of Hesse, and vacant after Philip II's death. With support from Hanover, Prussia and the Imperial Council, Juliane managed to achieve a rapid withdrawal of the Hessian troops.

The Government of Juliane is considered extremely beneficial. She conducted thorough reforms of the economy and education, downsized the court, continued the tolerant policy towards the Jews her father-in-law had introduced and managed to cut taxes. She appointed Bernhard Christoph Faust as her personal physician, and helped him significantly with the introduction of the smallpox inoculation.

Countess Juliane initiated a redesign of Hagenburg castle and she is considered the founder of the spa Bad Eilsen.

== Issue ==
Philip and Juliane had four children.

- Countess Eleonore Luise (1781–1783)
- Countess Wilhelmine Charlotte (1783–1858)
- Count Georg Wilhelm (1784–1860), later (first) Prince Sovereign of Schaumburg-Lippe
- Countess Karoline Luise (1786–1846)

== Death ==
She died on 9 November 1799 after a severe cold and was buried in a mausoleum in the Schaumburg Forest. Count von Wallmoden-Gimborn continued to act as a regent for her son.

== Ancestors ==
Ancestors of Princess Juliane of Hesse-Philippsthal

8. Philip, Landgrave of Hesse-Philippsthal (= 12)
4. Charles I, Landgrave of Hesse-Philippsthal
9. Catherine Amalie of Solms-Laubach (= 13)
2. William, Landgrave of Hesse-Philippsthal
10. John William III, Duke of Saxe-Eisenach
5. Caroline Christine of Saxe-Eisenach
11. Christine Juliane of Baden-Durlach
1. Juliane, Landgravine of Hesse-Philippsthal
12. Philip, Landgrave of Hesse-Philippsthal (= 8)
6. William, Landgrave of Hesse-Philippsthal-Barchfeld
13. Catherine Amalie of Solms-Laubach (= 9)
3. Ulrika Eleonora of Hesse-Philippsthal-Barchfeld
14. Lebrecht, Prince of Anhalt-Zeitz-Hoym
7. Charlotte Wilhelmine of Anhalt-Bernburg-Schaumburg-Hoym
15. Eberhardine of Weede
