= Ernest Constantine, Landgrave of Hesse-Philippsthal =

Ernest Constantine
- Landgrave of Hesse-Philippsthal
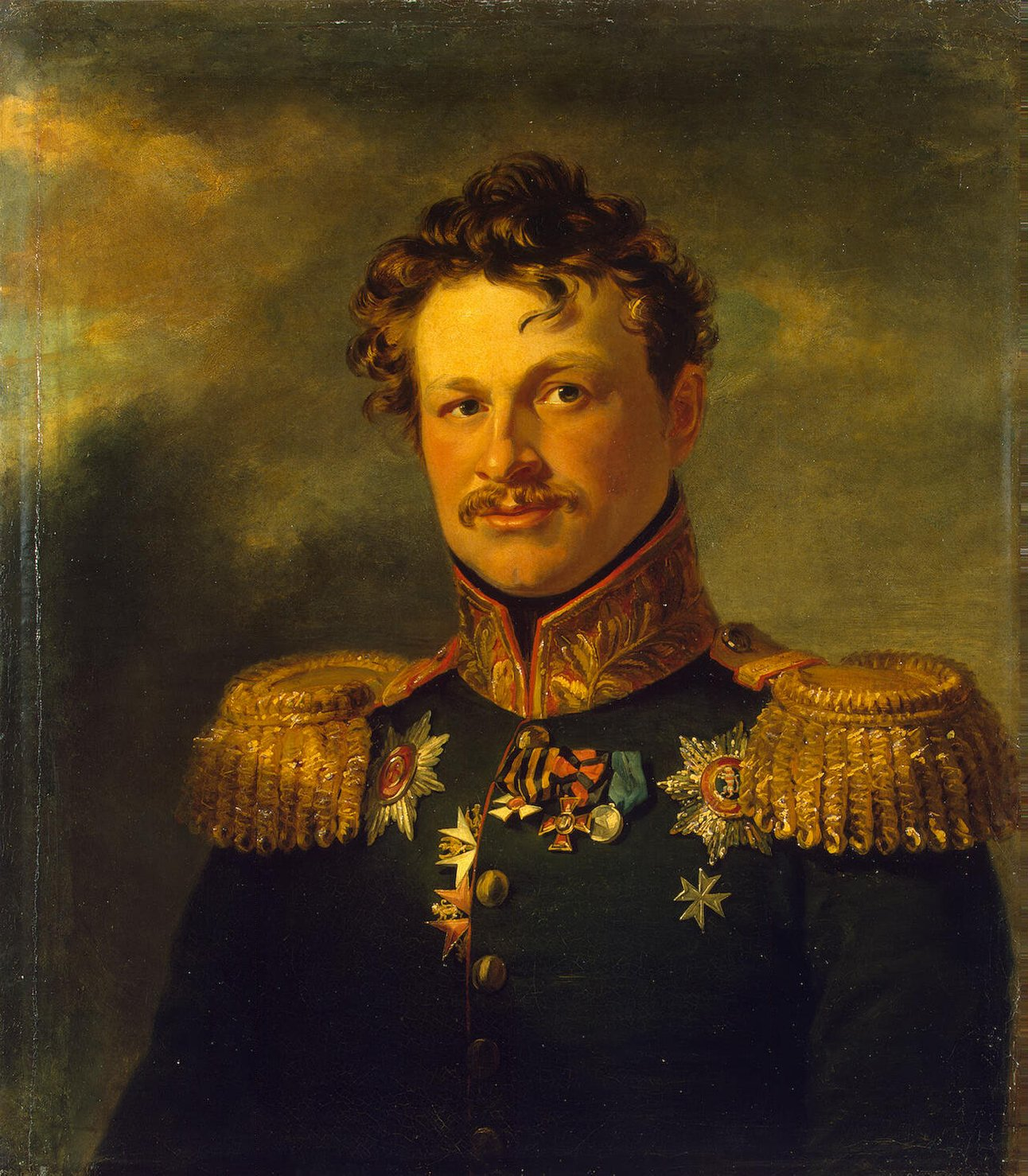
- Portrait, c. 1820–25
- Born: 8 August 1771; Philippsthal
- Died: 25 December 1849 (aged 78); Meiningen
- Spouse: Louise of Schwarzburg-Rudolstadt; Caroline of Hesse-Philippsthal
- Issue: Charles II, Landgrave of Hesse-Philippsthal
- House: Hesse
- Father: William, Landgrave of Hesse-Philippsthal
- Mother: Ulrika Eleonora of Hesse-Philippsthal-Barchfeld

Ernest Constantine (German: Ernst Constantin; 8 August 1771 – 25 December 1849) was Landgrave of Hesse-Philippsthal from 1816 until his death.

== Life ==
Ernest Constantine was born in Philippsthal on 8 August 1771 to Landgrave William of Hesse-Philippsthal and Ulrike Eleonora, daughter of William, Landgrave of Hesse-Philippsthal-Barchfeld.

Until 1796 he was an officer in Dutch service. In 1797, he acquired the porcelain manufactory in Volkstedt (a suburb of Rudolstadt), which he sold two years later.

In 1808 he became Grand Chamberlain of the Jérôme Bonaparte, the King of Westphalia. After the dissolution of the kingdom of Westphalia, Ernst Constantine succeeded his brother Louis as Landgrave of Hesse-Philippsthal in 1816. He also re-entered Dutch service, where he was appointed general.

Ernest Constantine died on 25 December 1849 in Meiningen and was later buried in Philippsthal.

== Marriage and issue ==
Ernest Constantine married Louise (1775-1808), the daughter of Prince Frederick Charles of Schwarzburg-Rudolstadt (1736-1793), on 10 April 1796 in Rudolstadt, with whom he had the five children:

- Frederick William (1797-1797)
- Ferdinand (1799-1837)
- George Gustav (1801-1802)
- Charles II (1803-1868), who succeeded him as Landgrave of Hesse-Philippsthal, married the Duchess Marie of Württemberg (1818-1888) in 1845
- Francis (1805-1861), created Baron of Falkener in 1841, married (morganatically) Mary Catharine Kohlmann (1819-1904)

Later, he married his niece, Caroline of Hesse-Philippsthal (1793-1869), daughter of his elder brother Prince Charles of Hesse-Philippsthal, on 17 February 1812 in Kassel. From his second marriage he had two children:

- Victoria (1812-1837)
- William Edward (1817-1819)

== Ancestors ==
Ancestors of Ernest Constantine, Landgrave of Hesse-Philippsthal

16. William VI, Landgrave of Hesse-Kassel (= 24)
8. Philip, Landgrave of Hesse-Philippsthal (= 12)
17. Hedwig Sophia of Brandenburg (= 25)
4. Charles I, Landgrave of Hesse-Philippsthal
18. Charles Otto of Solms-Laubach (= 26)
9. Catherine Amalie of Solms-Laubach (= 13)
19. Amöne Elisabeth of Bentheim-Steinfurt (= 27)
2. William, Landgrave of Hesse-Philippsthal
20. John George I, Duke of Saxe-Eisenach
10. John William III, Duke of Saxe-Eisenach
21. Countess Johannetta of Sayn-Wittgenstein
5. Caroline Christine of Saxe-Eisenach
22. Charles Gustav of Baden-Durlach
11. Christine Juliane of Baden-Durlach
23. Anna Sophia of Brunswick-Wolfenbüttel
1. Ernest Constantine, Landgrave of Hesse-Philippsthal
24. William VI, Landgrave of Hesse-Kassel (= 16)
12. Philip, Landgrave of Hesse-Philippsthal (= 8)
25. Hedwig Sophia of Brandenburg (= 17)
6. William, Landgrave of Hesse-Philippsthal-Barchfeld
26. Charles Otto of Solms-Laubach (= 18)
13. Catherine Amalie of Solms-Laubach (= 9)
27. Amöne Elisabeth of Bentheim-Steinfurt (= 19)
3. Ulrika Eleonora of Hesse-Philippsthal-Barchfeld
28. Victor Amadeus, Prince of Anhalt-Bernburg
14. Lebrecht, Prince of Anhalt-Zeitz-Hoym
29. Countess Palatine Elisabeth of Zweibrücken
7. Charlotte Wilhelmine of Anhalt-Bernburg-Schaumburg-Hoym
30. John George, Baron of Weede
15. Eberhardine of Weede
31. Agnes Margaret of Raesfeld-Middachten

Ernest Constantine, Landgrave of Hesse-Philippsthal House of Hesse Born: 8 August 1771 Died: 25 December 1849
Preceded by Louis	Landgrave of Hesse-Philippsthal; 1816-1849	Succeeded by Charles II
