= Ernest, Landgrave of Hesse-Philippsthal =

Member of the House of Hesse and last ruling Landgrave of Hesse-Philippsthal (1846-1925)

Ernest of Hesse-Philippsthal
- Born: 20 December 1846; Philippsthal
- Died: 22 December 1925 (aged 79); Eisenach
- House: House of Hesse
- Father: Charles II, Landgrave of Hesse-Philippsthal
- Mother: Marie of Württemberg

Ernest Eugene Charles Augustus Bernard Paul of Hesse-Philippsthal (German: Ernst Eugen Karl August Bernhard Paul von Hessen-Philippsthal; born 20 December 1846 in Philippsthal; died 22 December 1925 in Eisenach) was a member of the House of Hesse and was the last ruling Landgrave of Hesse-Philippsthal.

== Life ==
Ernst was the eldest son of the Landgrave Charles II of Hesse-Philippsthal (1803-1868) from his marriage to Duchess Marie of Württemberg (1818-1888), a daughter of Duke Eugen of Württemberg.

After the Electorate of Hesse including Hesse-Philippsthal was annexed by Prussia in 1866, Ernest resigned on all subsequent claims on Hesse-Philippsthal in 1868, together with Landgrave Alexis of Hesse-Philippsthal-Barchfeld. In 1880, he received as compensation an annual income of 300000marks, plus the Hanau City Castle in Hanau, Rotenburg Castle and Schönfeld Castle in Kassel.

Ernest died in 1925 unmarried and without descendants. With his death, the main Hesse-Philippsthal line of the House of Hesse died out. Only the junior lines Hesse-Philippsthal-Barchfeld and Hesse-Kassel-Rumpenheim remained; the first inherited his estate.

== Ancestors ==
Ancestors of Ernest, Landgrave of Hesse-Philippsthal

8. William, Landgrave of Hesse-Philippsthal
4. Ernest Constantine, Landgrave of Hesse-Philipptshal
9. Ulrika Eleonora of Hesse-Philippsthal-Barchfeld
2. Charles II, Landgrave of Hesse-Philippsthal
10. Frederick Charles, Prince of Schwarzburg-Rudolstadt
5. Louise of Schwarzburg-Rudolstadt
11. Friederike Sophie Auguste of Schwarzburg-Rudolstadt
1. Ernest of Hesse-Philippsthal
12. Duke Eugen of Württemberg
6. Duke Eugen of Württemberg
13. Louise of Stolberg-Gedern
3. Marie of Württemberg
14. George I, Prince of Waldeck and Pyrmont
7. Princess Mathilde of Waldeck and Pyrmont
15. Princess Augusta of Schwarzburg-Sondershausen

Ernest, Landgrave of Hesse-Philippsthal House of Hesse Born: 20 December 1846 Died: 22 December 1925
Titles in pretence
Preceded by Charles II	— TITULAR — Landgrave of Hesse-Philippsthal; 1868-1925	Succeeded by Chlodwig
