= Louis, Landgrave of Hesse-Philippsthal =

German nobleman and a general

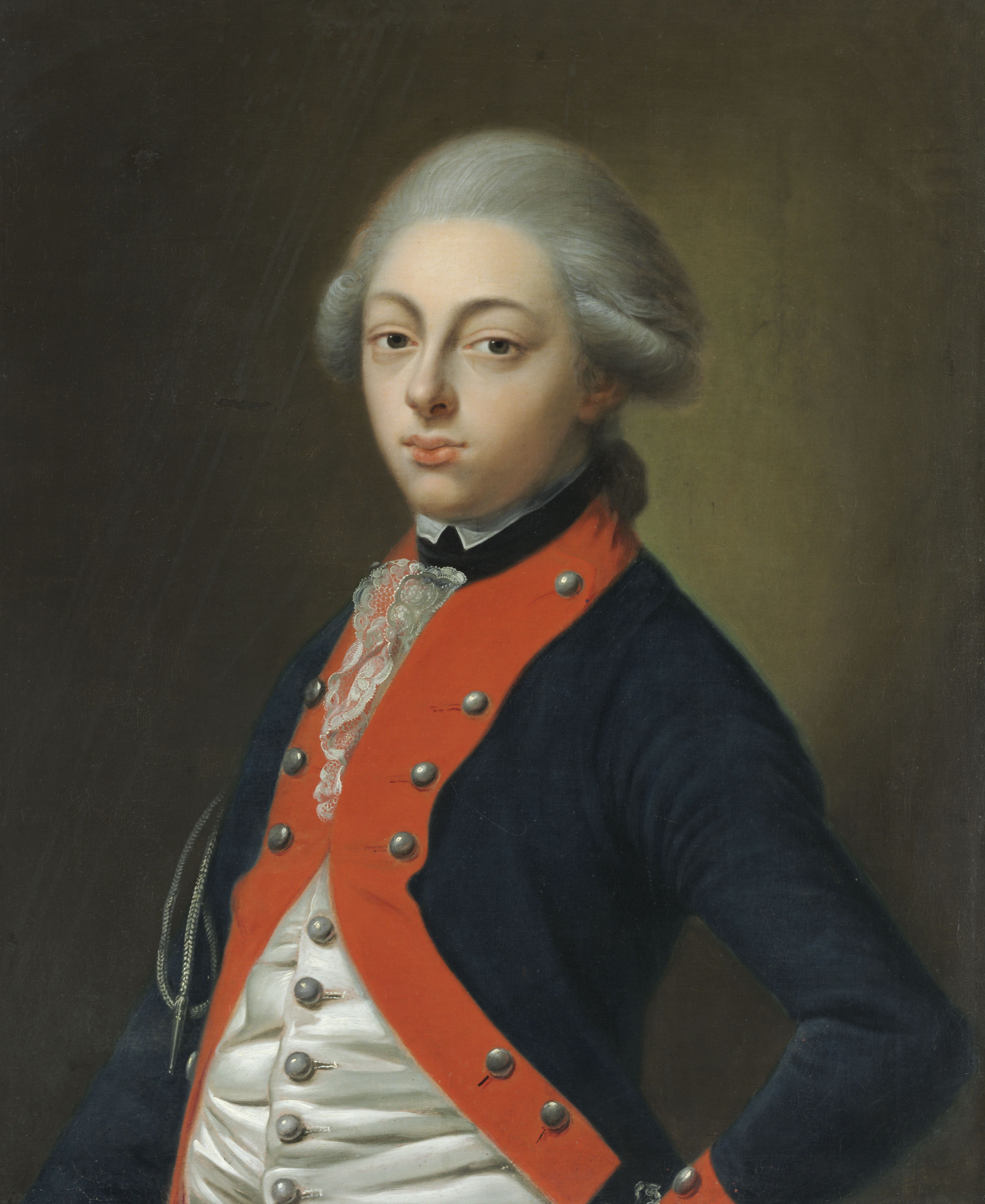
- 1782 portrait
- Born: 8 October 1766; Philippsthal
- Died: 15 February 1816 (aged 49); Naples
- Spouse: Marie Franziska Berghe of Trips
- House: House of Hesse
- Father: William, Landgrave of Hesse-Philippsthal
- Mother: Ulrika Eleonora, Landgravine of Hesse-Philippsthal-Barchfeld

Louis of Hesse-Philippsthal (German: Ludwig von Hessen-Philippsthal; 8 October 1766 – 15 February 1816) was a German nobleman and a general. He fought for the Kingdom of Naples (later Kingdom of the Two Sicilies). From 1813 until his death, he was the ruling Landgrave of Hesse-Philippsthal.

== Biography ==
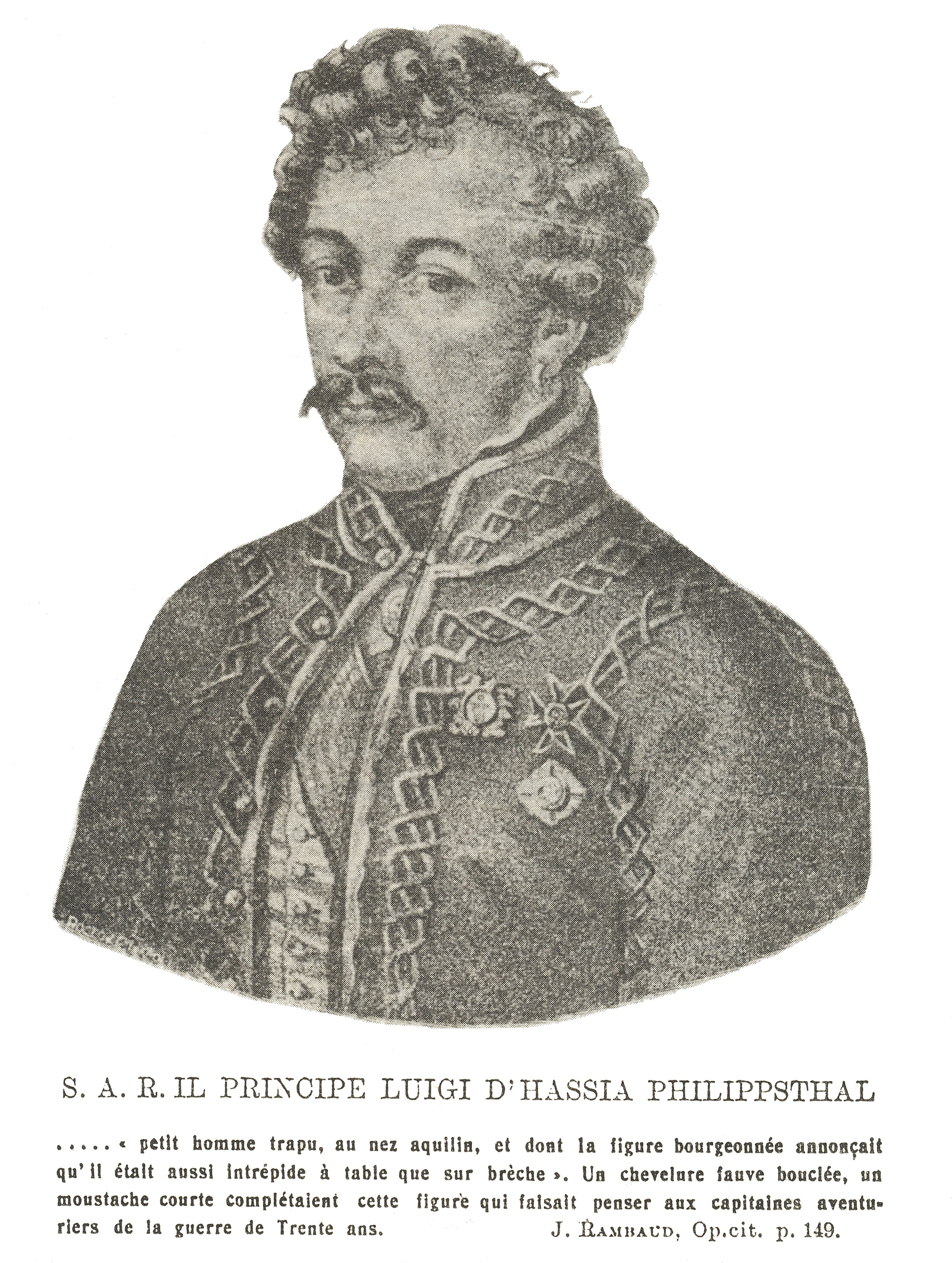
Portrait of Louis (1807), Archivio Storico della Calabria

Louis was born at Philippsthal as the son of William, Landgrave of Hesse-Philippsthal and Princess Ulrike Eleonora of Hesse-Philippsthal-Barchfeld.

A prince of the family of the Landgraves of Hesse-Philippsthal, he fought for the Kingdom of Naples during the Napoleonic Wars. In the course of the War of the Third Coalition, he commanded the garrison of the fortress of Gaeta in the siege laid by the French in 1806, refusing to obey the order of the Neapolitan government to surrender it. His troops resisted for six months, until 18 July after Louis, while leading his men on the bastions, was wounded on 10 July and had to leave the fortress.

Later, together with colonel Nunziante and lieutenant colonel Bardot, an expedition of 4,000 men who left Sicily in 1807 to attempt the reconquest of the mainland of Naples. They were however defeated in the Battle of Mileto of 28 May 1807.

After the death of his brother Charles in the siege of Frankfurt in 1793, Louis succeeded him as hereditary prince of the landgraviate of Hesse-Philippsthal. When Louis died childless at Naples in 1816 (his only son had died in 1802, aged four), the title went to his brother Ernst Konstantin.

== Marriage and issue ==
On 21 January 1791 in Susteren, Louis married Countess Marie Franziska Berghe von Trips, daughter of Count Franz Adolph Berghe von Trips and his second wife, Eleonore Kunigunde von Rathsamhausen. His parents were initially unaware of this marriage and resisted recognizing it when they learned about it, as her family, although an ancient noble one, did not belong to the small circle of ruling families. Moreover, he had to resign from the Dutch army, as officers were not allowed to marry Catholics. Marie Franziska had connections, and obtained a position for her husband in the army of the Kingdom of Naples, as she served as the Mistress of the Robes at the court of Queen Maria Carolina.

Louis and Marie Franziska had two children:

- Caroline (1793–1872), married in 1810 to Count Ferdinand de la Ville sur Illon (d. 1865), divorced 1814
- William (1798–1802)

== Sources ==
- Le Bas, Philippe (1842). France, dictionnaire encyclopédique (in French). Firmin Didot.

Louis, Landgrave of Hesse-Philippsthal House of Hesse Born: 8 October 1766 Died: 15 February 1816
Preceded by William	Landgrave of Hesse-Philippsthal; 1813-1816	Succeeded by Ernest Constantine
