= Philip II of Schaumburg-Lippe =

Philip II
- Count of Schaumburg-Lippe
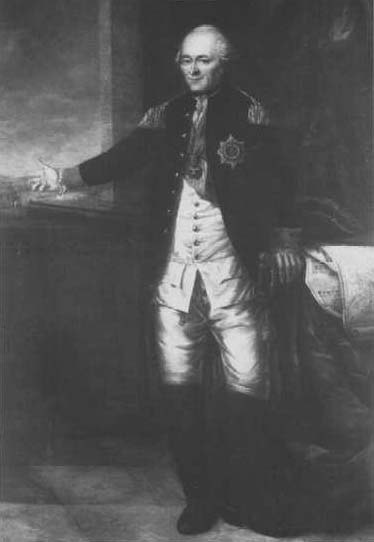
- Born: 5 July 1723; Rinteln
- Died: 13 February 1787 (aged 66); Bückeburg
- Noble family: House of Lippe
- Spouses: Ernestine Albertine of Saxe-Weimar (m. 1756; died 1769) Juliane of Hesse-Philippsthal (m. 1780)
- Issue: George William, Prince of Schaumburg-Lippe
- Father: Frederick Ernest, Count of Lippe-Alverdissen
- Mother: Elisabeth Philippine of Friesenhausen

Philipp II Ernst, Count of Schaumburg-Lippe (5 July 1723 – 13 February 1787) was a ruler of the counties of Lippe-Alverdissen and Schaumburg-Lippe.

== Early life ==
He was born at Rinteln the son of Friedrich Ernst, Count of Lippe-Alverdissen and his wife Elisabeth Philippine von Friesenhausen. His father was the son of Count Philipp Ernest I, the founder of the Lippe-Alverdissen line of the House of Lippe and his wife Duchess Dorothea Amalia of Schleswig-Holstein-Sonderburg-Beck (1656-1739).

== Biography ==
He succeeded his father as Count of Lippe-Alverdissen in 1749 and ruled until he inherited the Schaumburg-Lippe territories following the death of his cousin William on the 10 September 1777. He reigned as Count until his death on the 13 February 1787 when he was succeeded by his only surviving son Georg Wilhelm.

== Marriages and children ==
He was married firstly on the 6 May 1756 at Weimar to Princess Ernestine Albertine of Saxe-Weimar (1722-1769), the daughter of Ernest August I, Duke of Saxe-Weimar. From this marriage he had four children:

- Count Clemens August (1757-1757)
- Count Karl Wilhelm (1759-1780)
- Count Georg Karl (1760-1776)
- Countess Friederike Antoinette (1762-1777)

He was married secondly on 10 October 1780 at Philippsthal to Landgravine Juliane of Hesse-Philippsthal (1761-1799), daughter of William, Landgrave of Hesse-Philippsthal. They had four children:

- Countess Eleonore Luise (1781-1783)
- Countess Wilhelmine Charlotte (1783-1858) married Count Ernst zu Münster, Minister of Hanover, parents of Prince Georg Herbert zu Münster.
- Count Georg Wilhelm (1784-1860), later (first) Prince (Sovereign) of Schaumburg-Lippe.
- Countess Karoline Luise (1786-1846)

Philip II of Schaumburg-Lippe House of Lippe Born: 5 July 1723 Died: 13 February 1787
Regnal titles
Preceded by Friedrich Ernst	Count of Lippe-Alverdissen; 1749–1777	United with Schaumburg-Lippe
Preceded by Wilhelm	Count of Schaumburg-Lippe; 1777–1787	Succeeded by Georg Wilhelm
