= Frederick, Landgrave of Hesse-Philippsthal-Barchfeld =

Frederick
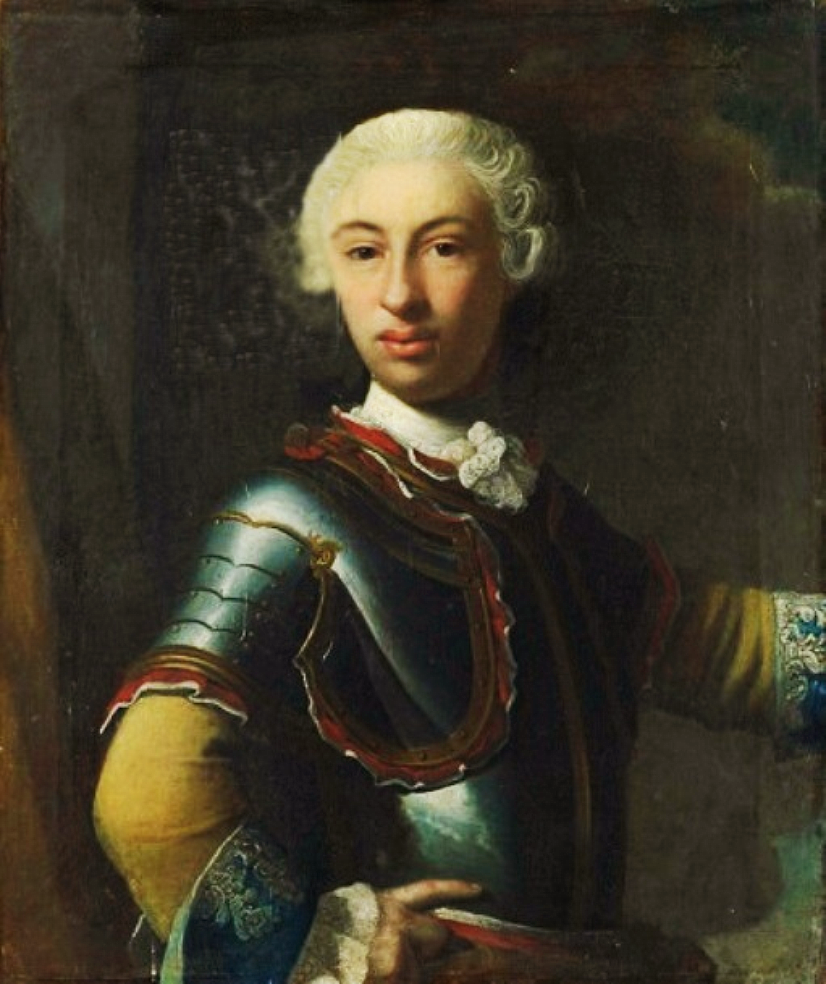
- Portrait, c. 1750–1760
- Born: 13 February 1727; Grave
- Died: 13 November 1777 (aged 50); Barchfeld
- Spouse: Wild- and Rhinegravine Sophia Henrietta of Salm-Grunbach
- House: House of Hesse
- Father: William, Landgrave of Hesse-Philippsthal-Barchfeld
- Mother: Charlotte Wilhelmine of Anhalt-Bernberg-Hoyn

Landgrave Frederick of Hesse-Philippsthal-Barchfeld (13 February 1727 in Grave – 13 November 1777 in Barchfeld) was the oldest son of Landgrave William of Hesse-Philippsthal-Barchfeld and his wife, Charlotte Wilhelmine of Anhalt-Bernberg-Hoyn. He succeeded his father as Landgrave of Hesse-Philippsthal-Barchfeld in 1761.

In 1772, he married Wild- and Rhinegravine Sophia Henrietta of Salm-Grunbach (1740–1800). The marriage remained childless. Frederick died in 1777 and was succeeded by his brother Adolph.

== Ancestry ==
Ancestors of Frederick, Landgrave of Hesse-Philippsthal-Barchfeld

16. William V, Landgrave of Hesse-Kassel
8. William VI, Landgrave of Hesse-Kassel
17. Countess Amalie Elisabeth of Hanau-Münzenberg
4. Philip, Landgrave of Hesse-Philippsthal
18. George William, Elector of Brandenburg
9. Hedwig Sophia of Brandenburg
19. Elizabeth Charlotte of the Palatinate
2. William, Landgrave of Hesse-Philippsthal-Barchfeld
20. Albert Otto II of Solms-Laubach
10. Charles Otto of Solms-Laubach
21. Catharina Juliana of Hanau-Münzenberg
5. Catherine Amalie of Solms-Laubach
22. Arnold Jobst of Bentheim-Bentheim
11. Amöna Elisabeth of Bentheim-Steinfurt
23. Anna Amalia of Ysenburg-Büdingen
1. Frederick, Landgrave of Hesse-Philippsthal-Barchfeld
24. Christian II, Prince of Anhalt-Bernburg
12. Victor Amadeus, Prince of Anhalt-Bernburg
25. Eleonore Sophie of Schleswig-Holstein-Sonderburg
6. Lebrecht, Prince of Anhalt-Zeitz-Hoym
26. Frederick, Count Palatine of Zweibrücken
13. Countess Palatine Elisabeth of Zweibrücken
27. Anna Juliane of Nassau-Saarbrücken
3. Charlotte Wilhelmine of Anhalt-Bernburg-Schaumburg-Hoym
28. John of Weede
14. John George, Baron of Weede
29. Catherine de Cuyper
7. Baroness Eberhardine Jacobine Wilhelmine of Weede
30. Reinier of Raesfeld-Middachten
15. Agnes Margaret of Raesfeld-Middachten
31. Margaret of Leefdael

Frederick, Landgrave of Hesse-Philippsthal-Barchfeld House of Hesse Born: 1727 Died: 1777
Preceded by William	Landgrave of Hesse-Philippsthal-Barchfeld; 1761-1777	Succeeded by Adolph
