= Ernestine Albertine of Saxe-Weimar =

18th-century German noblewoman

Princess Ernestine Albertine
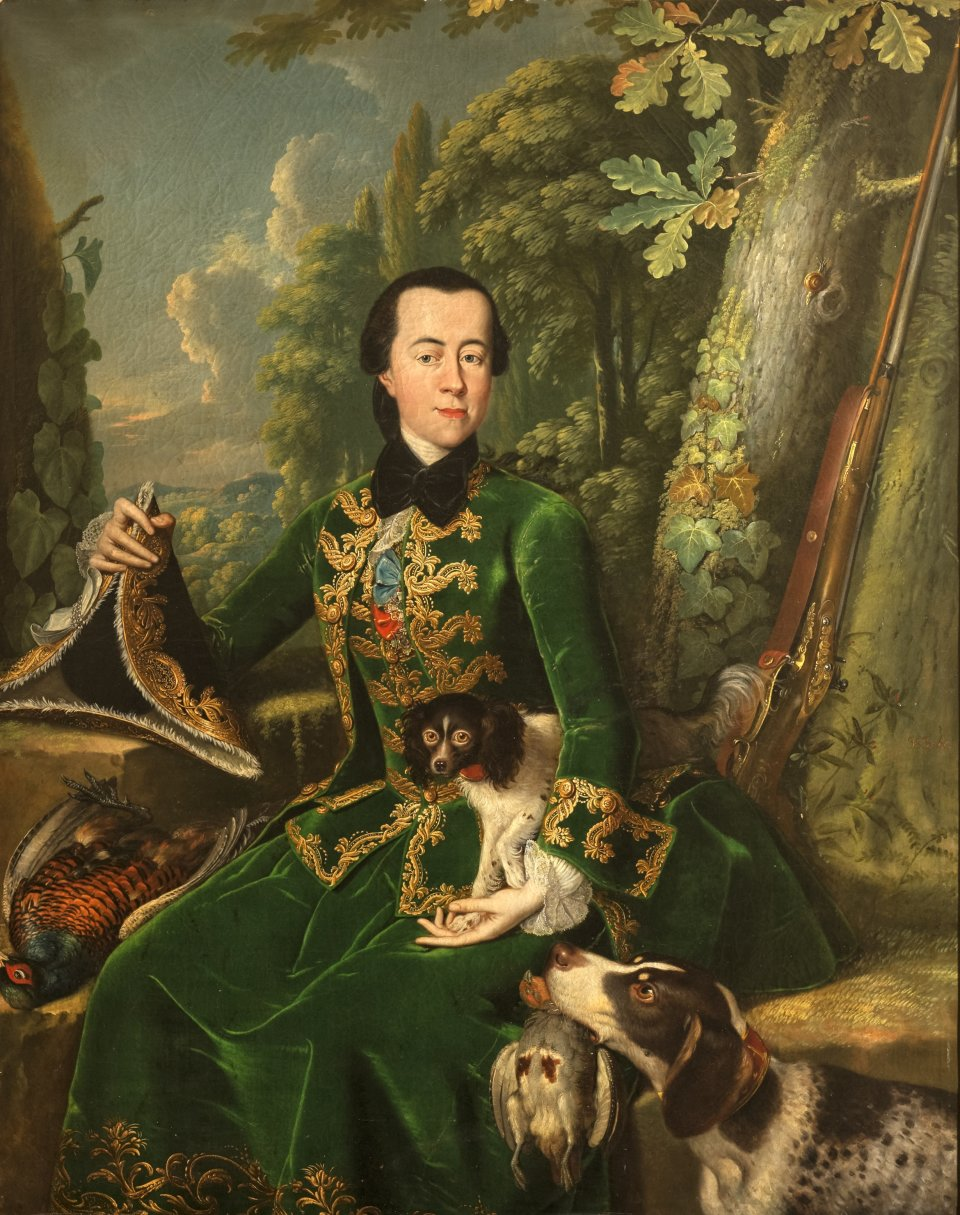
- Ernestine Albertine in 1755

Countess consort of Lippe-Alverdissen
- Reign: 6 May 1756 – 25 November 1769
- Born: 28 December 1722; Weimar, Saxe-Weimar; Holy Roman Empire
- Died: 25 November 1769 (aged 46); Lippe-Alverdissen; Holy Roman Empire
- Spouse: Philip II, Count of Lippe-Alverdissen (m. 1756)
- Issue: Count Clemens August; Count Karl Wilhelm; Count Georg Karl; Countess Friederike Antoinette
- House: Saxe-Weimar-Eisenach
- Father: Ernest Augustus I, Duke of Saxe-Weimar-Eisenach
- Mother: Princess Eleonore Wilhelmine of Anhalt-Köthen

Ernestine Albertine, Countess of Lippe-Alverdissen (née Princess Ernestine Albertine of Saxe-Weimar; 28 December 1722 – 25 November 1769) was the first wife and consort of Philip II, Count of Lippe-Alverdissen.

== Biography ==
Princess Ernestine Albertine of Saxe-Weimar was born in Weimar on 28 December 1722 to Ernest Augustus I, Duke of Saxe-Weimar-Eisenach and Princess Eleonore Wilhelmine of Anhalt-Köthen.

On 6 May 1756 she married Philip II, Count of Lippe-Alverdissen, becoming the Countess consort of Lippe-Alverdissen. They had four children:

- Count Clemens August (1757-1757)
- Count Karl Wilhelm (1759-1780)
- Count Georg Karl (1760-1776)
- Countess Friederike Antoinette (1762-1777)

Ernestine Albertine died on 25 November 1769 in Alverdissen, seven years before her husband succeeded his cousin, Wilhelm, as the Count of Schaumburg-Lippe.
