= Battle of Mileto =

1807 Battle during the War of the Fourth Coalition

- Part of the War of the Fourth Coalition
Date	28 May 1807
Location	Mileto (present-day Italy)
Result	French victory

Belligerents
France	Kingdom of Sicily

Commanders and leaders
(First French Empire) Jean Reynier	(Kingdom of Sicily) Louis of Hesse-Philippsthal

Strength
5,000	5,000

Casualties and losses
unknown	1,633 and 6 guns

The Battle of Mileto took place during the War of the Fourth Coalition on 28 May 1807 in Calabria. The Bourbon Kingdom of Sicily attempted to re-conquer its possessions in continental Italy, known as the Kingdom of Naples. The battle ended in a victory for French forces under general Jean Reynier.

== Preparations ==
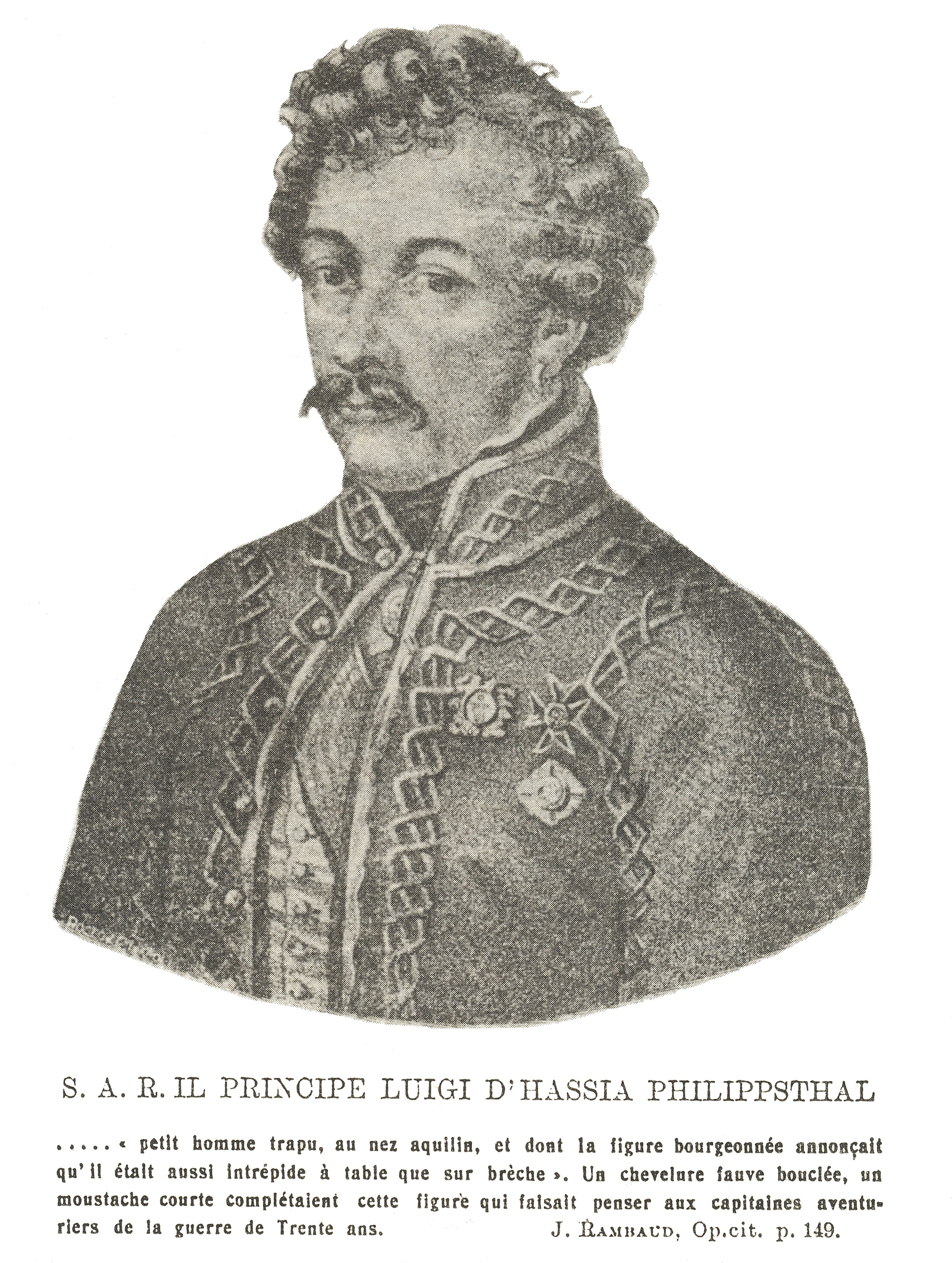
Louis of Hesse-Philippsthal, the Bourbon commander.

Ferdinand IV of Naples sided with the Third Coalition against Napoleon and so in 1806 France invaded his kingdom, forcing its royal family to flee to Sicily and turning the area into a battleground between France and Britain, the two main powers attempting to control the Mediterranean at the time. The Bourbon royals allied themselves with Britain, whose Royal Navy protected Sicily, whilst Napoleon I made his brother Joseph Bonaparte king of Naples, which he remained until 1808, when he was succeeded by Joachim Murat.

From their Sicilian base, the Bourbons and the British then attempted to foment a brigand revolt against the new French-ruled Kingdom of Naples. These stirrings of revolt made life difficult for the French rulers and triggered a vicious crackdown, mainly led by captain Charles Antoine Manhès, formerly an aide de camp to Murat. Ferdinand and his wife Maria Carolina of Austria continued their claims to the Kingdom of Naples, particularly on Maria's part - she hated France for guillotining her sister Marie Antoinette during the French Revolution. It was Maria who chose Louis of Hesse-Philippsthal as commander of the Bourbon army.

In 1806 Louis defended Gaeta against the French and in May 1807 landed in Calabria, intending to defeat the French once and for all. He had around 3,500 men under his command, augmented by irregular troops from among the massisti, whilst his officers included colonel Vito Nunziante. For a year the French followed a policy of strategic withdrawal in the face of the Bourbon advance and concentrating their troops (around 5,000 men) at Monteleone (now known as Vibo Valentia).

== Battle ==
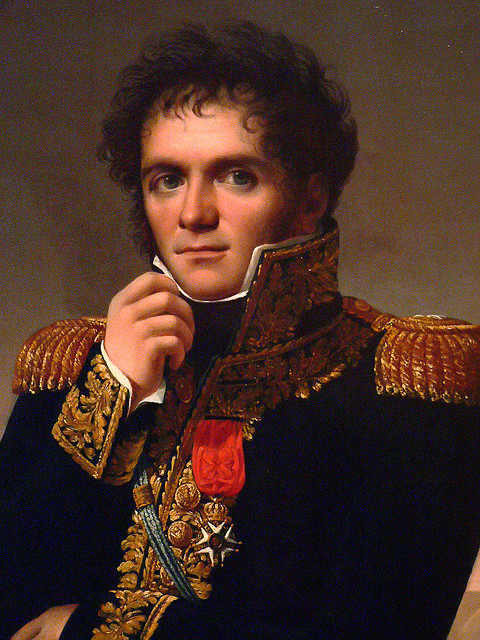
Jean Reynier, the French commander.

Before the battle Reynier addressed his troops about their earlier defeat at Maida:

Your comrades' blood cries out for vengeance. Neither valor nor tricks were lacking at Sant'Eufemia [ie Maida], it was just that fortune turned against us. But now she shows herself favourable, because of the enemy's treachery. Revenge and triumph will come easy indeed, if we only remember we are French.

Bourbon attempts to land on the Tropea coast were prevented by the civic guards of the coastal towns and attempts at internal insurrection had no better success - those attempts were led by bands of massisti commanded by noted brigands such as Francatrippa and accompanied by regular Bourbon troops.

Philippsthal and his army moved from Rosarno to Mileto on 26 May 1807. Journals and accounts of the battle from both sides state errors made by the Bourbon force - colonel Nunziante and other officers warned Philippsthal to leave his position at Mileto (tactically-unfavourable should the enemy attack), but he did not heed their advice and was attacked by the French at 4.30 on 28 May on the hills of Nao and Pizzinni, which overlooked the town of Mileto. From here the battle shifted to the outskirts of the town of Mileto, where the houses and countryside to its south were fought over with rifle fire and bayonet. The encounter was bloody and the Bourbon army was routed and pursued to Rosarno, Gioia Tauro, Seminara and finally to the gates of Reggio Calabria. The two combatants totalled around 10,000, of whom a very high percentage were killed.

The sources state that the battle turned on a moment when the Bourbon cavalry charged but was repulsed by the French infantry. It then fled back towards the Bourbon front rank, leading to a panic which spread to the second rank and led to a hasty and disorderly flight by the irregular Bourbon troops harried by the army and the French cavalry. As they escaped, the irregulars also looted their own Bourbon allies and the defeat turned into a total rout.

It was later realised that the main reason for the Bourbon rout had been the inferior structure of their army, which was still organised on feudal lines - such an army was capable of quelling internal rebellions but inadequate for a pitched battle in which it faced an organised and experienced army with veterans of several previous victories in the French Revolutionary Wars and Napoleonic Wars, especially without the land forces of its British ally (which had been present at the previous Anglo-Bourbon victory at Maida on 4 July 1806). The original Bourbon plan of reconquering Naples had also not been implemented at the time of the battle. That plan had hinged on dividing the Bourbon force into five corps which would envelop the French forces and at the same time support a general uprising by the local population, combining these two prongs to annihilate the French. Varied political reasons meant that the plan did not become a reality, leading to the defeat at Mileto.

== Aftermath ==
Despite being a Bourbon defeat, it left behind so many mainland foci for anti-French resistance that Napoleon then decided to abandon his plan to capture Sicily. It did, however, reverse the balance of power established at Maida the previous year and guaranteed French control of Calabria until 1815, when Ferdinand IV was returned to the throne by the Congress of Vienna. Murat then made a failed attempt to re-conquer Naples and was shot at Pizzo on 13 October 1815 after a summary trial, with the kingdoms of Naples and Sicily reunified in 1816 under Ferdinand IV, who restyled himself Ferdinand I of the Two Sicilies.

== Bibliography ==
- (in Italian) Francesco Pititto, La battaglia di Mileto : 28 maggio 1807, p. 121, Tip. A. Signoretta, Mileto, 1917 (Estratto da: Archivio Storico della Calabria, a. IV - 1916)

Preceded by Great Sortie of Stralsund	Napoleonic Wars; Battle of Mileto	Succeeded by Battle of Guttstadt-Deppen
