= William, Landgrave of Hesse-Philippsthal =

William
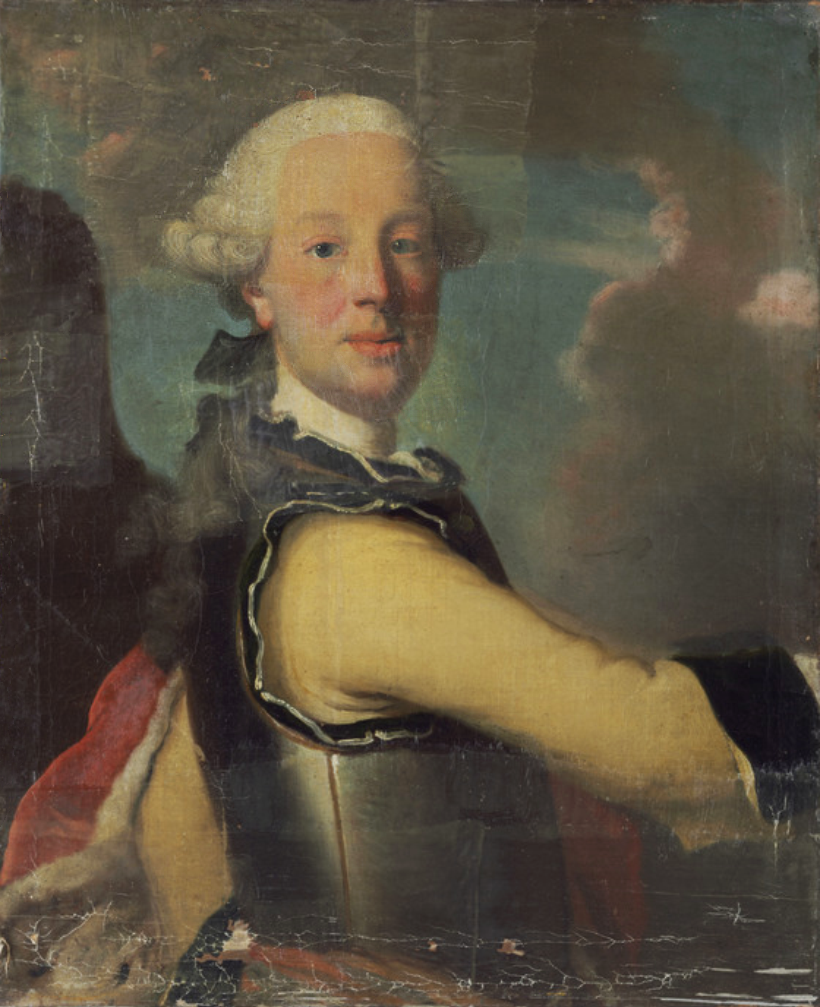
- Born: 29 August 1726; Philippsthal
- Died: 8 August 1810 (aged 83); Philippsthal
- Spouse: Ulrika Eleonora of Hesse-Philippsthal-Barchfeld
- Issue: Juliane, Countess of Schaumburg-Lippe; Louis, Landgrave of Hesse-Philippsthal; Ernest Constantine, Landgrave of Hesse-Philippsthal
- House: Hesse
- Father: Charles I, Landgrave of Hesse-Philippsthal
- Mother: Caroline Christine of Saxe-Eisenach

William of Hesse-Philippsthal (born 29 August 1726 in Philippsthal; died 8 August 1810, Philippsthal) was a member of the House of Hesse and Landgrave of Hesse-Philippsthal from 1770 until his death.

== Life ==
William was the eldest son of Landgrave Charles I of Hesse-Philippsthal from his marriage to Caroline Christine of Saxe-Eisenach (1699–1743), daughter of Duke John William III of Saxe-Eisenach. He succeeded his father in 1770 as Landgrave of Hesse-Philippsthal.

William served in the Dutch army as General of the Cavalry and Governor of 's-Hertogenbosch. William was also Komtur of the Knights Hospitallers of the Commandry of Łagów.

In 1806, the Landgraviate of Philippsthal was occupied by French troops and annexed to the short-lived Kingdom of Westphalia. William died before his territory could be liberated from the French.

== Marriage and issue ==
William married on 22 June 1755 in Tournai his cousin Ulrika Eleonora (1732–1795), daughter of Landgrave William of Hesse-Philippsthal-Barchfeld, with whom he had the following children:

- Caroline (1756–1756)
- Charles (1757–1793), lieutenant colonel in the Guard Regiment of Hesse-Kassel

married in 1791 princess Victoria of Anhalt-Bernburg (1772–1817), daughter of Prince Franz Adolph of Anhalt-Bernburg-Schaumburg-Hoym

- William (1758–1760)
- Frederick (1760–1761)
- Juliane (1761–1799)

married in 1780 Count Philip Ernest of Schaumburg-Lippe (1723–1787)

- Frederick (1764–1794) Imperial lieutenant colonel in a Russian Guard Regiment Cuirassiers
- Louis (1766–1816), Landgrave of Hesse-Philippsthal

married in 1791 Countess Marie Franziska Berghe von Trips (1771–1805), Mistress of the Robes at the court of Queen Maria Carolina

- William (1765–1766)
- Ernest Constantine (1771–1849), Landgrave of Hesse-Philippsthal

married firstly in 1796 Princess Louise of Schwarzburg-Rudolstadt (1775–1808)
married secondly in 1812 Princess Caroline of Hesse-Philippsthal (1793–1872)

== Ancestors ==
Ancestors of William, Landgrave of Hesse-Philippsthal

16. William V, Landgrave of Hesse-Kassel
8. William VI, Landgrave of Hesse-Kassel
17. Amalie Elisabeth of Hanau-Münzenberg
4. Philip, Landgrave of Hesse-Philippsthal
18. George William, Elector of Brandenburg
9. Hedwig Sophia of Brandenburg
19. Elizabeth Charlotte of the Palatinate
2. Charles I, Landgrave of Hesse-Philippsthal
20. Albert Otto II, Count of Solms-Laubach
10. Charles Otto, Count of Solms-Laubach
21. Katharina Juliana of Hanau-Münzenberg
5. Catherine Amalie of Solms-Laubach
22. Arnold Jost, Count of Bentheim-Bentheim
11. Amöne Elisabeth of Bentheim-Steinfurt
23. Anna Amalie of Ysenburg-Büdingen
1. William, Landgrave of Hesse-Philippsthal
24. William, Duke of Saxe-Weimar
12. John George I, Duke of Saxe-Eisenach
25. Eleonore Dorothea of Anhalt-Dessau
6. John William III, Duke of Saxe-Eisenach
26. Ernest, Count of Sayn-Wittgenstein-Sayn
13. Countess Johannetta of Sayn-Wittgenstein
27. Louise Juliane of Erbach-Breuberg
3. Caroline Christine of Saxe-Eisenach
28. Frederick VI, Margrave of Baden-Durlach
14. Charles Gustav of Baden-Durlach
29. Christina Magdalena of the Palatinate-Zweibrücken
7. Christine Juliane of Baden-Durlach
30. Anthony Ulrich, Duke of Brunswick-Wolfenbüttel
15. Anna Sophia of Brunswick-Wolfenbüttel
31. Elisabeth Juliana of Schleswig-Holstein-Sønderburg-Nordborg

== References and sources ==
- Carl Eduard Vehse: Geschichte der deutschen Höfe seit der Reformation, p. 319
- Georg Hassel: Allg. Europäisches Staats u. Address…, p. 247

William, Landgrave of Hesse-Philippsthal House of Hesse Born: 29 August 1726 Died: 8 August 1810
Preceded by Charles I	Landgrave of Hesse-Philippsthal; 1770–1806	Dormant Hesse-Philippsthal annexed by the Kingdom of Westphalia Title next held by Louis
