= Volkstedt porcelain =

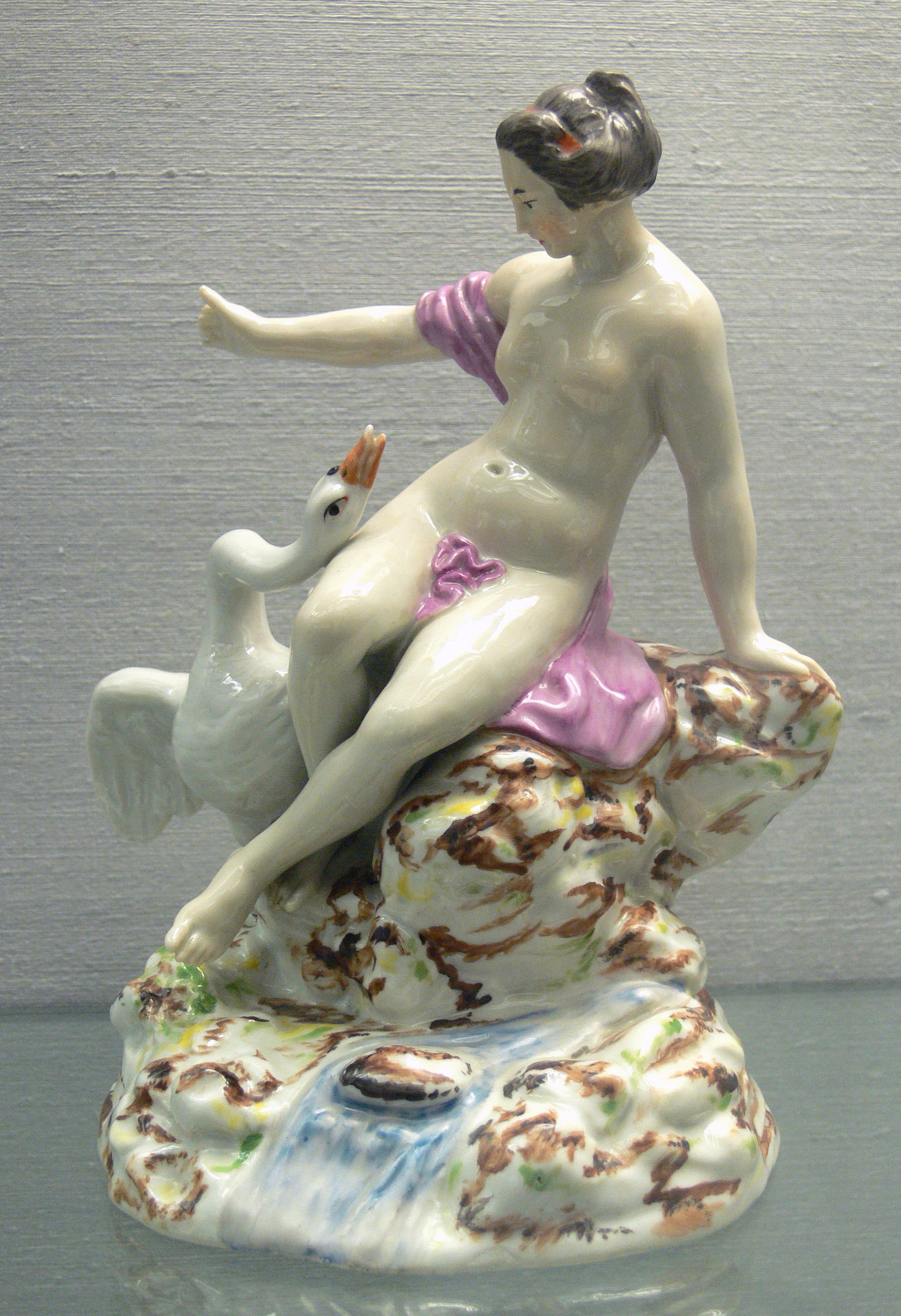
Leda and the Swan, Volkstedt porcelain, c 1785 (Kunstgewerbemuseum Berlin)

Volkstedt porcelain manufactory sited in Rudolstadt, Thuringia, Germany, was the earliest porcelain manufactory in Thuringia. It was in business as Aelteste Volkstedter Porzellanmanufaktur, the "Oldest Volkstedt Porcelain Manufactory", which was integrated into the VEB Vereinigte Zierporzellanwerke Lichte, which in turn formed part of the Kombinat Feinkeramik Kahla.

== History ==
The factory had its origins in an official request made 8 September 1760 by the porcelain maker Georg Heinrich Macheleid (1723 -1801). Macheleid had long worked in the glass manufactory at Glücksthal and had gained the arcana of porcelain-making by his own researches, apparently independent of Ehrenfried Walther von Tschirnhaus and Johann Friedrich Böttger, the ceramists at Meissen. He wished to open a privileged porcelain factory, making true hard-paste porcelain, intended to be sited in Sitzendorf. In 1762 the privilege was granted by John Frederick, Prince of Schwarzburg-Rudolstadt, a great patron of the arts and music, specifying that the manufactory was to be set up near his princely court of Schwarzburg-Rudolstadt, under his personal direction.

Volkstedt gained a reputation for its finely painted and carefully modeled porcelain figures that it holds for collectors today.

In 1797 Ernest Constantine, Landgrave of Hesse-Philippsthal, acquired the porcelain manufactory in Volkstedt, which he sold two years later. Following the reunification of Germany, in 2006/07 the factory buildings were restored to their 18th-century appearance and opened to the public.

During the 19th century the manufactory attracted subsidiary and rival workshops in Rudolstadt: they included Beyer & Bock, Karl Ens, Kämmer & Kramer, Ernst Bohne Söhne, Műller & Hammer.

Marks, in underglaze blue, include the ubiquitous crowned N adopted from Capodimonte by many manufactories, closed crown and R (Rudostadt) with crossed swords (adopted from Meissen) or 1762.
