= Charles I of Hesse-Philippsthal =

Landgrave of Hesse-Philippsthal from 1721 to 1770

Charles I, Landgrave of Hesse-Philippsthal
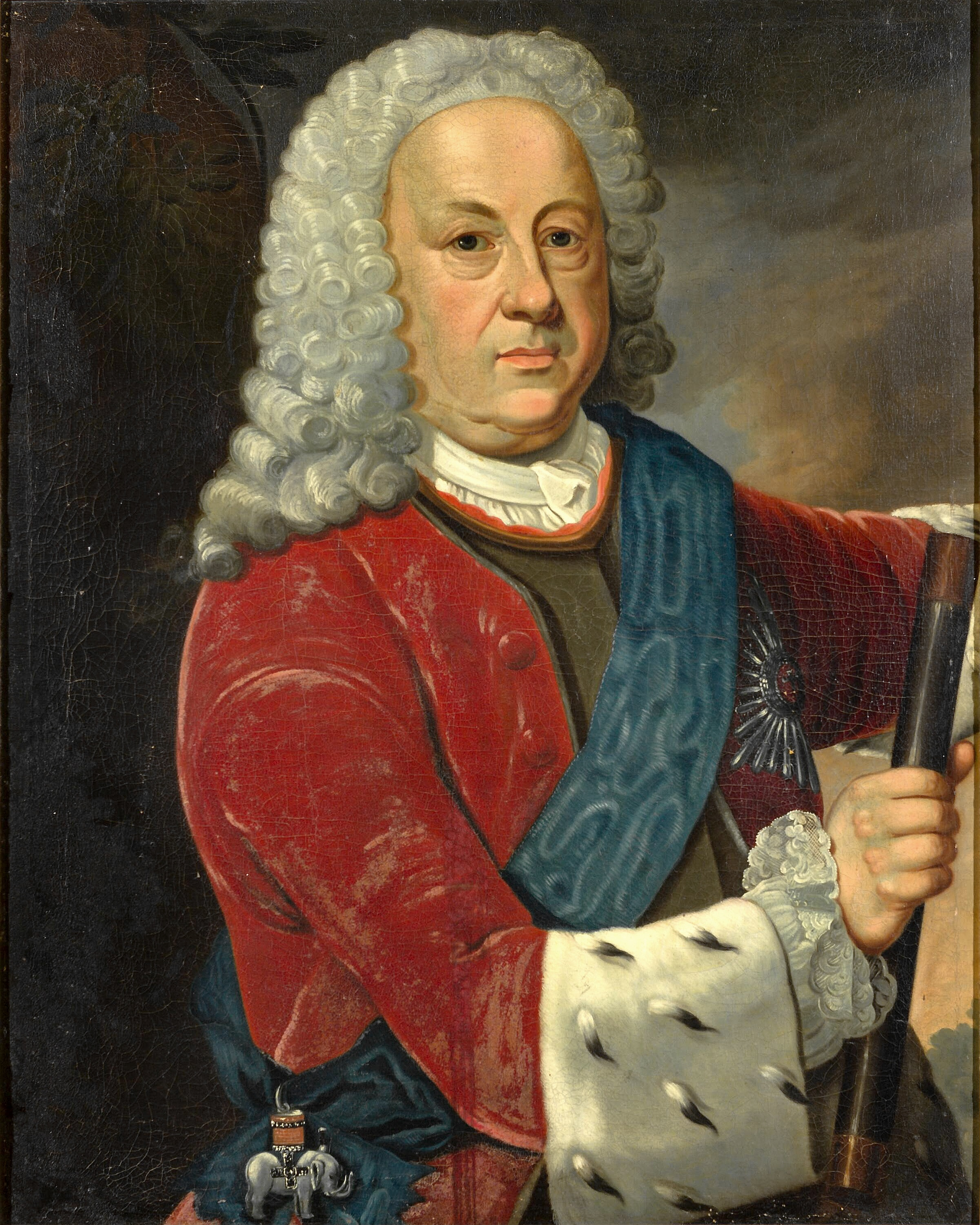
- Portrait of Charles I
- Born: 23 September 1682; Schmalkalden
- Died: 8 May 1770 (aged 87); Philippsthal
- Spouse: Caroline Christine of Saxe-Eisenach
- Issue: William, Landgrave of Hesse-Philippsthal; Princess Caroline Amalie; Prince Frederick; Charlotte Amalie, Duchess of Saxe-Meningen
- House: House of Hesse
- Father: Philip, Landgrave of Hesse-Philippsthal
- Mother: Catherine Amalie of Solms-Laubach

Charles I, Landgrave of Hesse-Philippsthal (23 September 1682 – 8 May 1770) was a member of the House of Hesse and Landgrave of Hesse-Philippsthal from 1721 until his death.

== Life ==
Charles was the eldest son of Landgrave Philip of Hesse-Philippsthal from his marriage to Countess Catherine Amalie of Solms-Laubach (1654-1736), the eldest daughter of Count Charles Otto of Solms-Laubach (1633-1676).

He succeeded his father in 1721 as Charles I, Landgrave of Hesse-Philippsthal.

Charles joined the army of Denmark–Norway in 1701 and fought in the War of the Spanish Succession. On 10 March 1710, he distinguished himself at the Battle of Helsingborg and was promoted to Major General. In 1715 he was involved in the landing at Rügen and the subsequent siege of Stralsund. He then joined the French army and was appointed Lieutenant General on 13 March 1721.

On 6 June 1731, he was awarded the Danish Order of the Elephant.

He later joined the Imperial military service, where he achieved the rank of Field Marshal.

== Marriage and issue ==
Charles married on 24 November 1725 in Eisenach Princess Caroline Christine of Saxe-Eisenach (1699–1743), the daughter of Duke John William III of Saxe-Eisenach by his second wife, Christine Juliane of Baden-Durlach.

They had the following children:

- William (1726–1810), Landgrave of Hesse-Philippsthal

married in 1755 princess Ulrika Eleonora of Hesse-Philippsthal-Barchfeld (1732-1795)

- Caroline Amalie (1728–1746)
- Frederick (1729–1751)
- Charlotte Amalie (1730–1801) married in 1750 Duke Anton Ulrich of Saxe-Meiningen (1687–1763)
- Philippine (1731–1762)
