= William, Landgrave of Hesse-Philippsthal-Barchfeld =

William
- Landgrave of Hesse-Philippsthal-Barchfeld
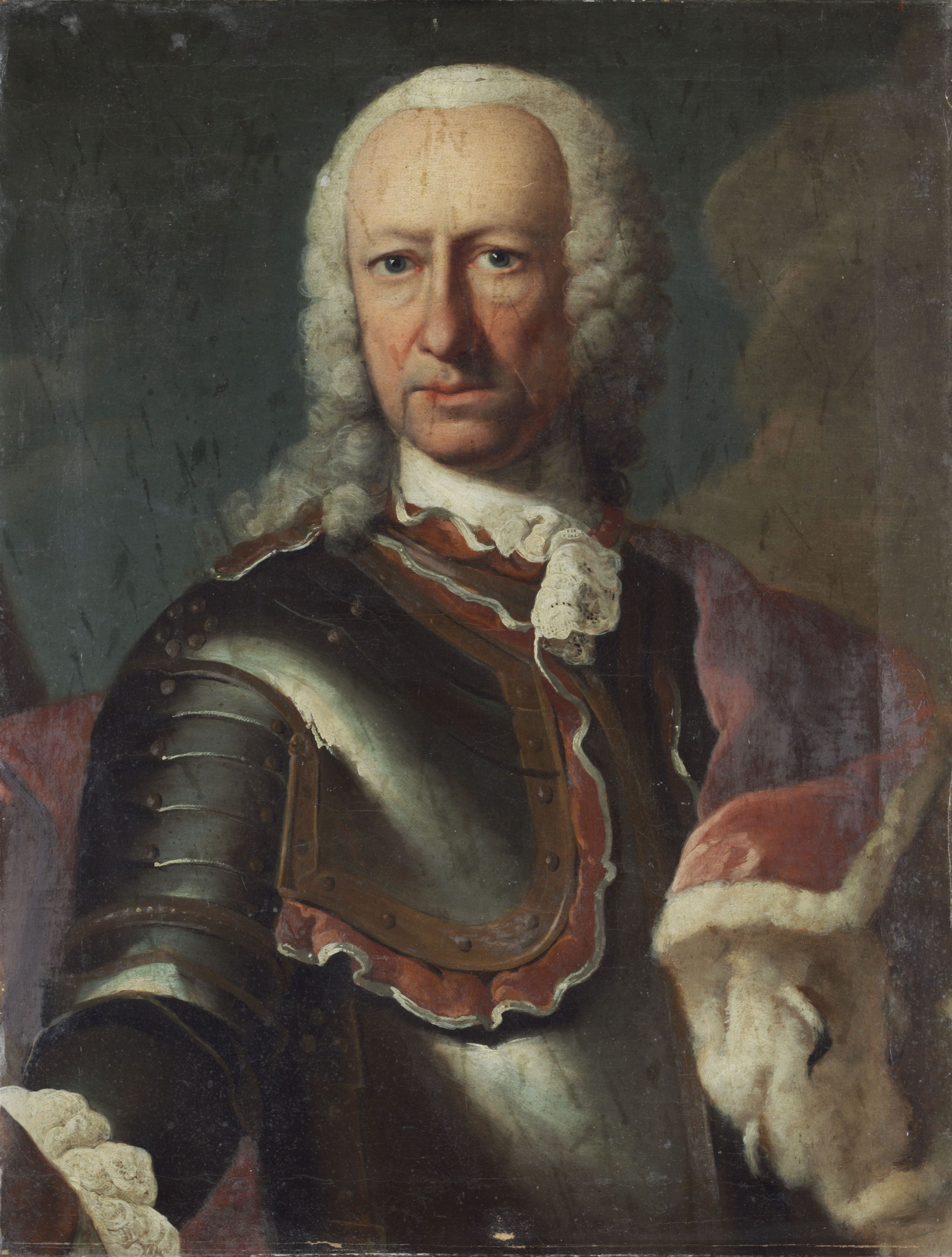
- Portrait, c. 1750–60
- Born: 1 April 1692; Philippsthal
- Died: 13 May 1761 (aged 69); Breda
- Spouse: Charlotte Wilhelmine of Anhalt-Bernburg-Schaumburg-Hoym
- Issue: Frederick, Landgrave of Hesse-Philippsthal-Barchfeld; Adolph, Landgrave of Hesse-Philippsthal-Barchfeld
- House: Hesse
- Father: Philip, Landgrave of Hesse-Philippsthal
- Mother: Catherine Amalie of Solms-Laubach

William of Hesse-Philippsthal-Barchfeld (1 April 1692 – 13 May 1761) was a member of the House of Hesse and was Landgrave of Hesse-Philippsthal-Barchfeld from 1721 to 1761.

== Life ==
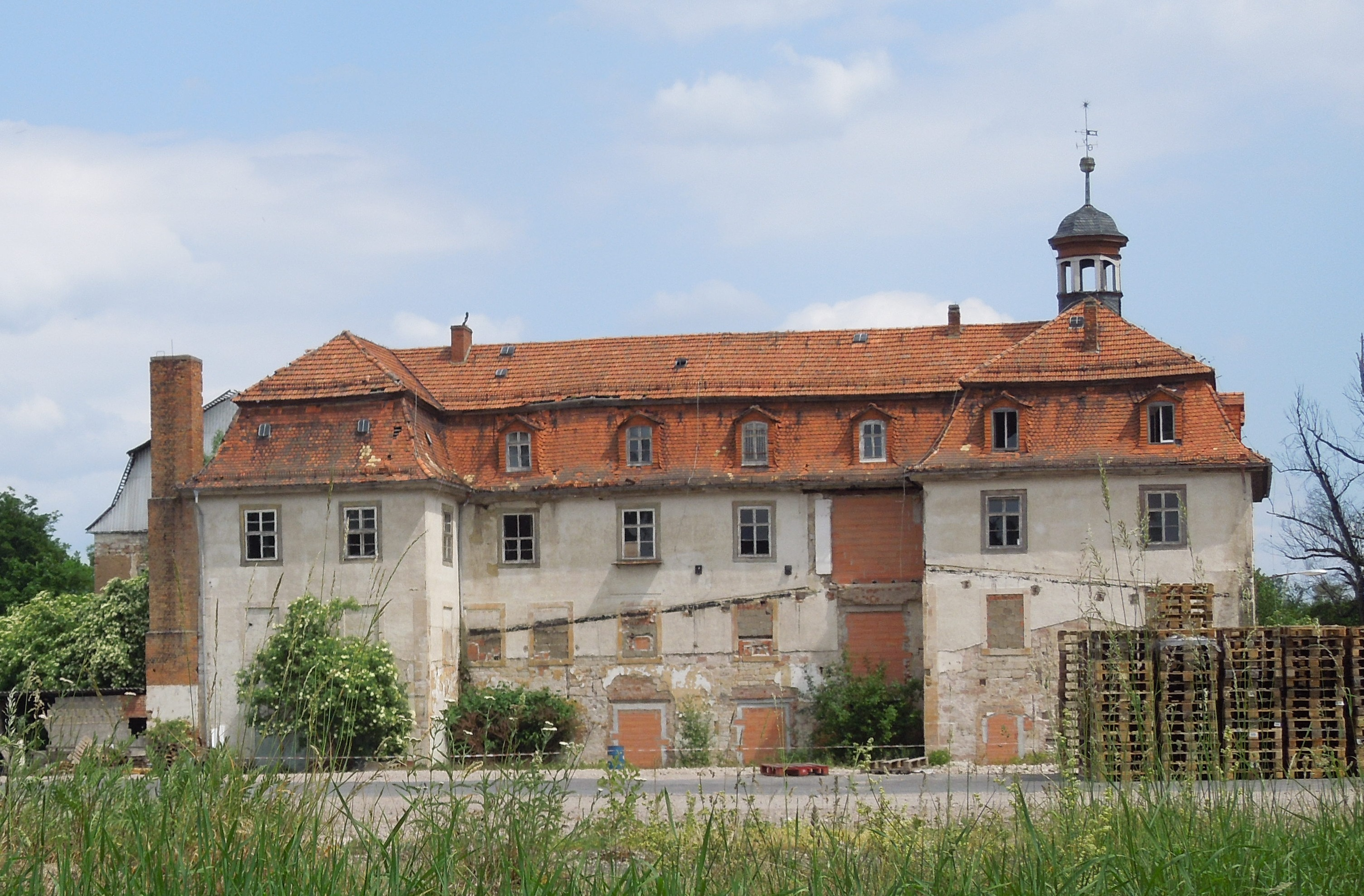
Wilhelmsburg Castle (may 2012)

William was a younger son of Landgrave Philip of Hesse-Philippsthal from his marriage to Catherine Amalie (1654–1736), daughter of Count Karl Otto of Solms-Laubach.

Wilhelm founded the non-sovereign line Hesse-Philippsthal-Barchfeld of the House of Hesse in 1721, after the death of his father, who had left him Barchfeld and Herleshausen in his will. Between 1690 and 1732 he built the baroque Wilhelmsburg Castle with three wings, which was named after him, in Barchfeld.

He served in the Hessian army and later in the Dutch army. In 1732, he was appointed governor of Ypres. In 1733, he was promoted to lieutenant general of the cavalry. In 1743, he led the Dutch troops in the War of the Austrian Succession. In 1744, he had to surrender Ypres to the French. He fought in the Battle of Fontenoy and defended Bergen op Zoom and Mons. In 1747 he was promoted General of the Cavalry.

He died in 1761, as governor of Breda.

== Marriage and issue ==
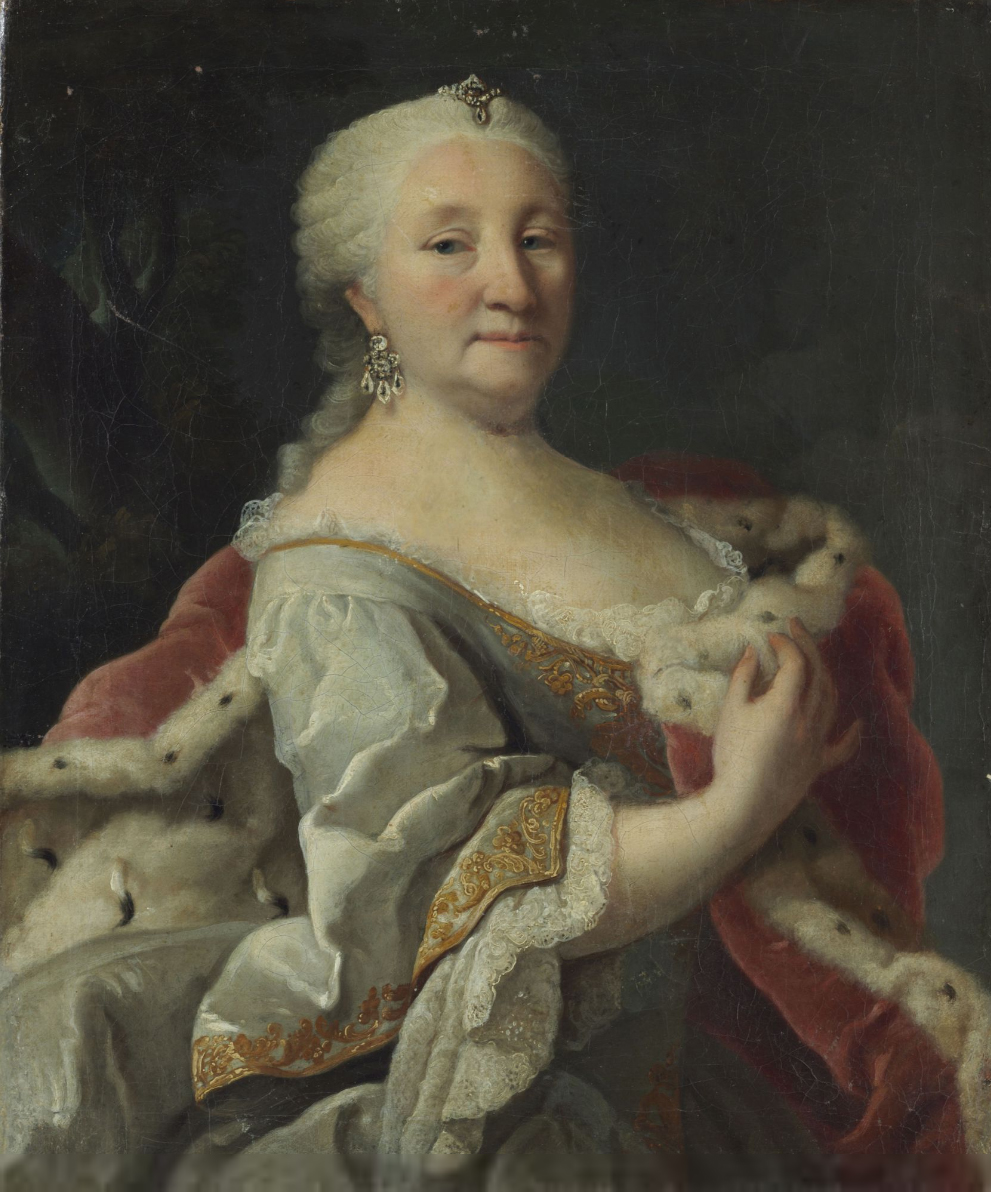
Landgrave Wilhelm's wife: Princess Charlotte Wilhelmine von Anhalt-Bernburg-Schaumburg-Hoym

William married on 31 October 1724 in Hoym with Princess Charlotte Wilhelmine, daughter of Prince Lebrecht of Anhalt-Bernburg-Schaumburg-Hoym, with whom he had the following children:

- Charlotte (1725–1798)

married in 1765 Count Alfred August of Ysenburg and Büdingen in Waechtersbach (1717–1782)

- William (1726–1726)
- Frederick (1727–1777), who succeeded him as Landgrave of Hesse-Philippsthal-Barchfeld

married in 1772 Countess Sophie Henriette of Salm-Grumbach (1740–1800)

- Philip (1728–1745)
- Johanna Charlotte (1730–1799)
- Caroline (1731–1808)
- Ulrika Eleonora (1732–1795)

married in 1755 with Landgrave William of Hesse-Philippsthal (1726–1810)

- Charles William (1734–1764)
- Anna (1735–1785)

married in 1767 Count Adolph of Lippe-Detmold (1732–1800), son of Simon Henry Adolph of Lippe-Detmold

- George (1737–1740)
- Dorothea Marie (1738–1799)

married in 1764 John Karl Louis, Prince of Löwenstein-Wertheim-Freudenberg (1740–1816)

- Christian (1740–1750)
- Louis Frederick (1741–1741)
- Adolph (1743–1803), Landgrave of Hesse-Philippsthal-Barchfeld

married on 1781 to Princess Louise of Saxe-Meiningen (1752–1805)

- August (1745–1745)

== Ancestry ==
Ancestors of William, Landgrave of Hesse-Philippsthal-Barchfeld

16. Maurice, Landgrave of Hesse-Kassel
8. William V, Landgrave of Hesse-Kassel
17. Agnes of Solms-Laubach
4. William VI, Landgrave of Hesse-Kassel
18. Philip Louis II of Hanau-Münzenberg
9. Countess Amalie Elisabeth of Hanau-Münzenberg
19. Countess Catharina Belgica of Nassau
2. Philip, Landgrave of Hesse-Philippsthal
20. John Sigismund, Margrave of Brandenburg
10. George William, Elector of Brandenburg
21. Anna of Prussia
5. Hedwig Sophia of Brandenburg
22. Frederick IV, Elector Palatine
11. Elizabeth Charlotte of the Palatinate
23. Louise Juliana of Orange-Nassau
1. William, Landgrave of Hesse-Philippsthal-Barchfeld
24. Albert Otto I, Count of Solms-Laubach
12. Albert Otto II, Count of Solms-Laubach
25. Anna of Hesse-Darmstadt
6. Carl Otto, Count of Solms-Laubach
26. Philip Louis II, Count of Hanau-Münzenberg
13. Katharina Juliane of Hanau-Münzenberg
27. Countess Catharina Belgica of Nassau
3. Katharina Amalie of Solms-Laubach
28. Arnold III, Count of Bentheim-Steinfurt-Tecklenburg-Limburg
14. Arnold Jobst, Count of Bentheim and Steinfurt
29. Magdalena of Neuenahr-Alpen
7. Amöna Elisabeth of Bentheim and Steinfurt
30. Wolfgang Ernest I, Prince of Isenburg-Birstein
15. Anna Amalia of Ysenburg and Büdingen
31. Anna of Gleichen-Rembda

William, Landgrave of Hesse-Philippsthal-Barchfeld House of Hesse Born: 1 April 1692 Died: 13 May 1761
New division	Landgrave of Hesse-Philippsthal-Barchfeld; 1721–1761	Succeeded by Frederick
