= Philip, Landgrave of Hesse-Philippsthal =

Philip
- Landgrave of Hesse-Philippsthal
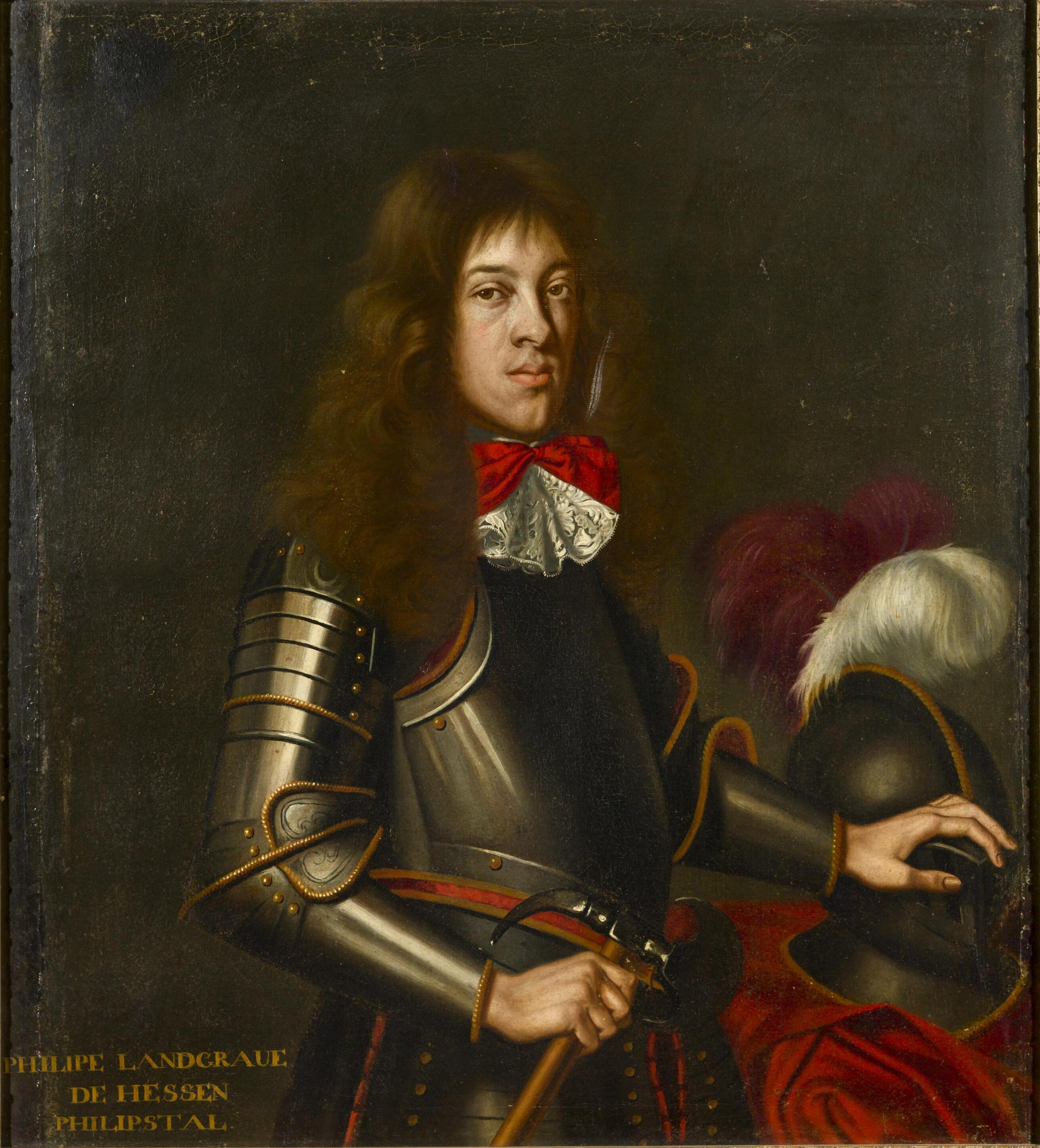
- Portrait, late 17th century
- Born: 14 December 1655; Kassel
- Died: 18 June 1721 (Aged 65); Aachen
- Spouse: Catherine, Countess von Solms-Laubach
- Issue: Wilhelmine of Hesse-Philipstahl; Charles I of Hesse-Philippsthal; Amélie of Hesse-Philippsthal; Amoene of Hesse-Philippsthal; Philip of Hesse-Philipsthal; Henriette of Hesse-Philippsthal; William of Hesse-Philippsthal-Barchfeld; Sophie of Hesse-Philippsthal
- House: House of Hesse-Philippsthal
- Father: William VI, Landgrave of Hesse-Kassel
- Mother: Hedwig Sophia of Brandenburg
- Religion: Calvinism

Philip of Hesse-Philippsthal (14 December 1655 – 18 June 1721) was the son of William VI, Landgrave of Hesse-Kassel and Hedwig Sophia of Brandenburg. He was the first Landgrave of Hesse-Philippsthal from 1663 to 1721 and the founder of the fifth branch of the House of Hesse.

== Marriage and issue ==
In 1680, Philip of Hesse-Philipsthal married Catherine of Solms-Laubach, daughter of Count Charles Otto of Solms-Laubach. They had eight children:

- Wilhelmine of Hesse-Philipstahl (1681–1699)
- Charles I of Hesse-Philippsthal, landgrave of Hesse-Philippsthal
- Amélie of Hesse-Philippsthal (1684–1754)
- Amoene of Hesse-Philippsthal (1685–1686)
- Philip of Hesse-Philipsthal (1686–1717) who, in 1714, married Marie von Limburg-Stirum (1689–1759), (daughter of Count Albert von Limburg-Stirum) and had children with her
- Henriette of Hesse-Philippsthal (1688–1761)
- William of Hesse-Philippsthal-Barchfeld, landgrave of Hesse-Philippsthal-Barchfeld, founder of the sixth branch of the House of Hesse
- Sophie of Hesse-Philippsthal (1695–1728) who in 1723 married Peter August, Duke of Schleswig-Holstein-Sonderburg-Beck (who died in 1775).

== Branch ==
Coat of arms of Hesse-Philippsthal branch

Philip of Hesse-Philippsthal belonged to the Hesse-Philipsthal branch; this fifth branch was issued from the first branch of the House of Hesse, itself issuing from the first branch of the House of Brabant.

After the abdication of Landgrave Ernest of Hesse-Philippsthal in 1868, the Hesse-Philippsthal branch perpetuated itself through the sixth branch of Hesse-Philippsthal-Barchfeld.

Today, this line is represented by Landgrave William of Hesse-Philippsthal-Barchfeld, the son of Landgrave Wilhelm of Hesse-Philippsthal-Barchfeld and Princess Marianne of Prussia.

== Ancestry ==
Ancestors of Philip, Landgrave of Hesse-Philippsthal

8. Maurice, Landgrave of Hesse-Kassel
4. William V, Landgrave of Hesse-Kassel
9. Countess Agnes of Solms-Laubach
2. William VI, Landgrave of Hesse-Kassel
10. Philip Louis II, Count of Hanau-Münzenberg
5. Countess Amalie Elisabeth of Hanau-Münzenberg
11. Countess Catharina Belgica of Nassau
1. Philip, Landgrave of Hesse-Philippsthal
12. John Sigismund, Elector of Brandenburg
6. George William, Elector of Brandenburg
13. Duchess Anna of Prussia
3. Margravine Hedwig Sophie of Brandenburg
14. Frederick IV, Elector Palatine
7. Countess Palatine Elizabeth Charlotte of Simmern
15. Countess Louise Juliana of Nassau

== Sources ==
- genroy.free.fr
