= Philippsthal =

- Municipality
- Coat of arms

- Location of Philippsthal within Hersfeld-Rotenburg district
- Interactive map of Philippsthal
- Location within Germany Location within Hesse
- Coordinates: 50°51′N 10°00′E
- Country: Germany
- State: Hesse
- Admin. region: Kassel
- District: Hersfeld-Rotenburg

Government
  - Mayor (2019–25): Timo Heusner (SPD)

Area
  - Total: 21.31 km^{2} (8.23 sq mi)
- Elevation: 315 m (1,033 ft)

Population (2025-12-31)
  - Total: 3,914
  - Density: 183.7/km^{2} (475.7/sq mi)
- Time zone: UTC+01:00 (CET)
  - Summer (DST): UTC+02:00 (CEST)
- Postal codes: 36269
- Dialling codes: 06620
- Vehicle registration: HEF
- Website: www.philippsthal.de

Philippsthal (German pronunciation: [ˈfɪlɪpstaːl]) is a market community in Hersfeld-Rotenburg district in eastern Hesse, Germany, right at the boundary with Thuringia.

== Geography ==
=== Location ===
Philippsthal lies between the outliers of the Rhön and the Thuringian Forest (ranges) on the river Werra. The river Ulster empties into the Werra between the main centre and the outlying centre of Röhrigshof.

The nearest major towns are Bad Hersfeld (some 25 km; 15 miles to the west) and Eisenach (some 29 km; 18 miles to the northeast).

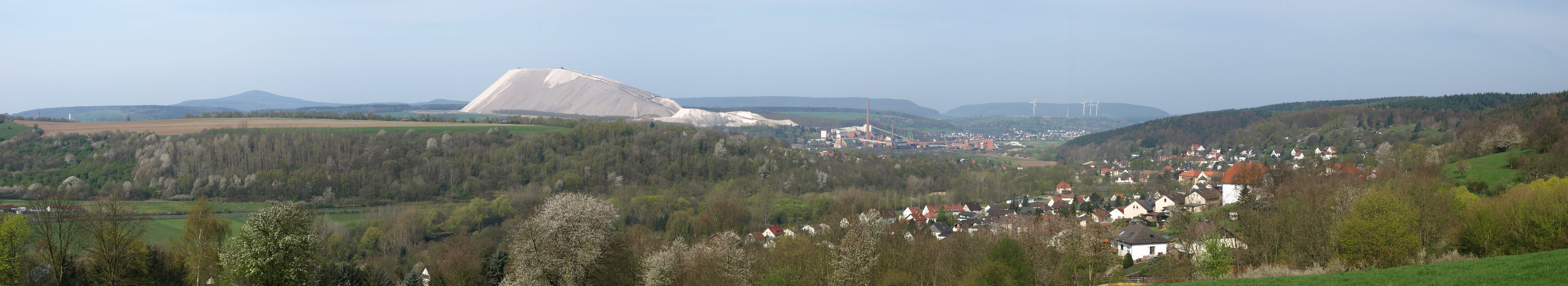
Pamorama of Philippsthal with the potash works' tailings heap. In the background are the northernmost mountains of the Rhön (Landecker Berg and Dreienberg). The peak at left is the Soisberg.

=== Neighbouring communities ===
Philippsthal borders in the north on the town of Heringen (in Hersfeld-Rotenburg), in the east on the town of Vacha, in the south on the communities of Unterbreizbach (both in the Wartburgkreis in Thuringia) and Hohenroda and in the west on the community of Friedewald (both in Hersfeld-Rotenburg).

=== Constituent communities ===
The community's Ortsteile are Gethsemane, Harnrode, Heimboldshausen, Philippsthal, Röhrigshof and Unterneurode. All these places were merged into a new greater community of Philippsthal within the framework of municipal reform on 1 August 1972. The title "market community" (Marktgemeinde) was granted the community on 30 May 2001.

== History ==
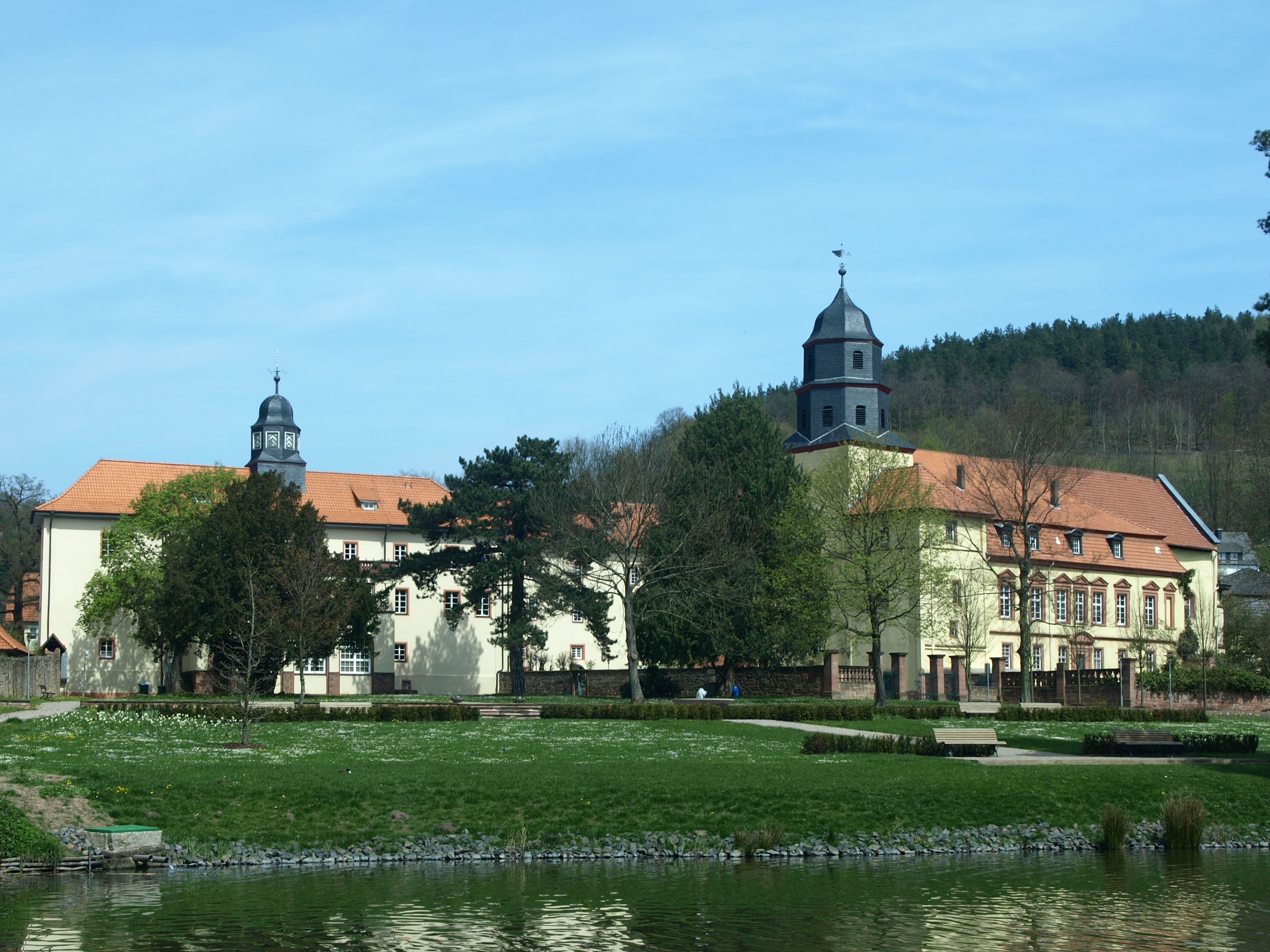
Schloss Philippsthal

In 1191, Philippsthal had its first documentary mention in a Schutzbrief ("protection letter") from Pope Celestine III to the Hersfeld Abbey. In this year, the Abbey founded a Benedictine convent and named it after the living knightly family von Cruceburg, after whom the growing community of Kreuzberg was then also named.

The convent was destroyed in the German Peasants' War in 1525 and forsaken by the nuns in 1568. All that is still preserved is the former convent church from the 12th century. On the spot where the convent stood, Landgrave Philipp of Hesse-Philippsthal (b. 14 December 1655, d. 18 June 1721) had a palatial residence built in 1685, which he named Schloss Philippsthal. By the late 18th century, this had become the local placename.

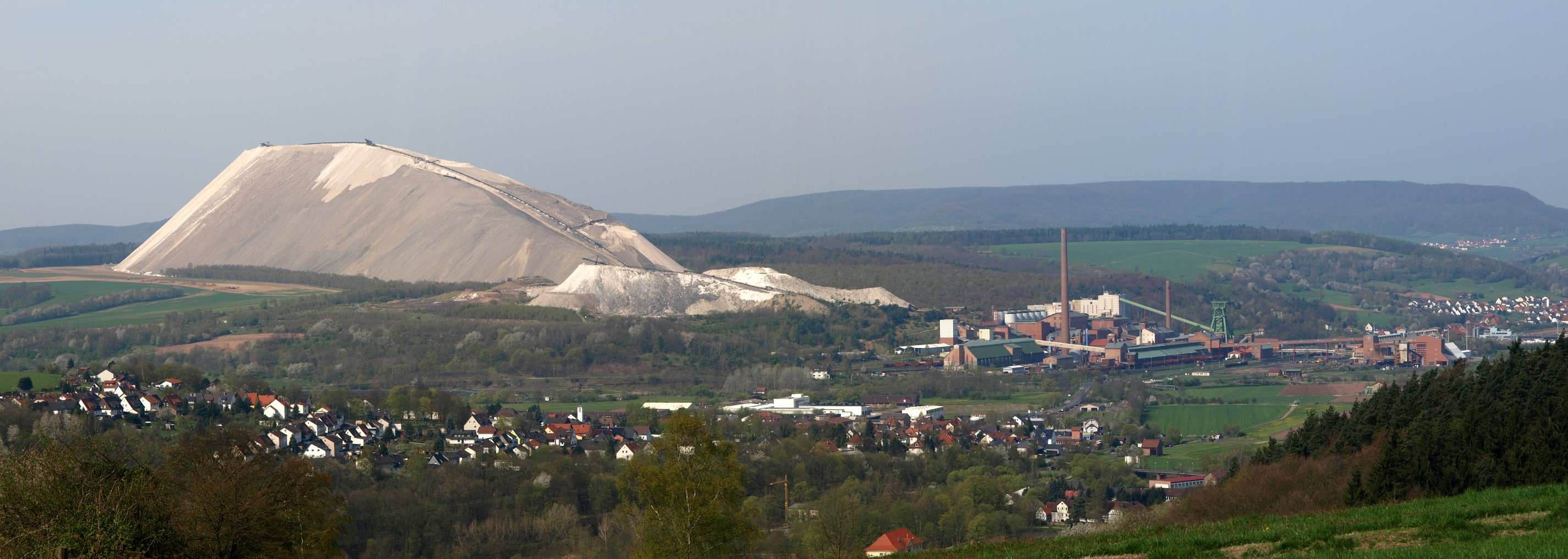
Potash works with tailings heap in Philippsthal

After mining began at the Hattorf potash works in 1905, the craft and weaving village became an industrial community.

During the time of Germany's division, the former Hoßfeld printing shop building earned some fame as the border between East Germany and West Germany ran straight through it. Only in 1976 did East and West Germany agree to a border adjustment that put the whole property in West Germany.

== Politics ==
=== Community council ===
The municipal election held on 26 March 2006 yielded the following results:

Parties and voter communities		% 2006	Seats; 2006	% 2001	Seats; 2001
CDU	Christian Democratic Union of Germany	19.8	5	19.5	5
SPD	Social Democratic Party of Germany	45.5	10	52.7	12
FWG	Freie Wahlgemeinschaft Philippsthal	34.7	8	27.9	6
Total		100.0	23	100.0	23
Voter turnout in %		56.2		63.0	

The community's executive (Gemeindevorstand) is made up of ten members, with four seats allotted to the SPD, two to the CDU and four to the FWG.

=== Mayors ===
The mayoral election on 16 September 2007 brought Ralf Orth (SPD) into office with 55.1% of the vote. Since 1 January 2008 he has been Hartwig Klotzbach's (FWG) successor after the latter had held the office since 2001. In 2019 Timo Heusner (SPD) was elected mayor.

=== Coat of arms ===
The community's arms might be described thus: Gules a mount of three argent, issuant therefrom a cross of Lorraine pattée of the second, upon the mound an inescutcheon azure a lion rampant barry of nine argent and gules armed and crowned Or.

The "double cross" recalls the convent in the community and the Hersfeld Abbey, which was a definite factor in earlier centuries. The striped lion (Hesse's heraldic beast) stands for the Landgraves of Hesse-Kassel, into whose ownership the community came in the 16th century.

=== Town partnerships ===
- Salies-du-Salat, Haute-Garonne, France since 1974
- (Germany) Vacha, Thuringia since 1990
- (Germany) Dorndorf, Thuringia since 1990

== Culture and sightseeing ==
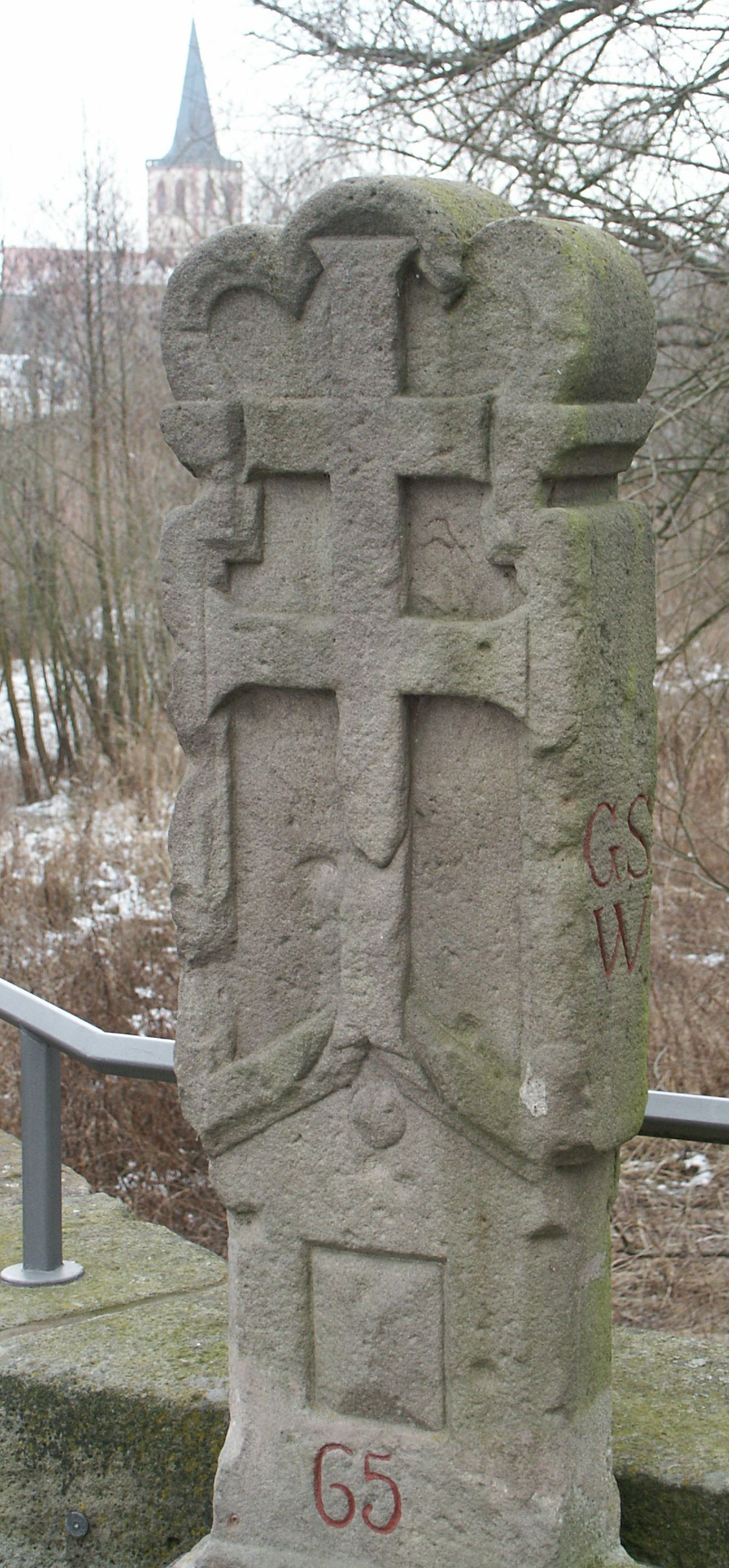
Hersfeld Abbey border stone at the old Werra Bridge between Philippsthal and Vacha

=== Museum ===
- Border Museum at the Torbogenhaus ("Gate Arch House")

=== Buildings ===
- Schloss Philippsthal (palace)
- Orangery in the palace park
- Three-naved convent church from the 12th century
