= House of Hesse =

European noble house originating from Hesse, Germany

- Parent family: House of Brabant
- Country: Germany, Netherlands, Sweden, Finland
- Founded: 1264; 762 years ago
- Founder: Henry I, Landgrave of Hesse
- Current head: Donatus, Landgrave of Hesse
- Final ruler: Ernest Louis, Grand Duke of Hesse
- Titles: Landgrave of Hesse (Lower Hesse line, Upper Hesse line, Kassel, Rotenburg, Wanfried, Rheinfels, Philippsthal, Philippsthal-Barchfeld, Marburg, Rheinfels, Darmstadt, Butzbach; Homburg, Braubach, Itter); Elector of Hesse; Grand Duke of Hesse and by Rhine; King of Sweden; King-elect of Finland; Prince of Bulgaria; Grand Duke of Finland
- Estate: Hesse
- Cadet branches: Hesse-Kassel; Hesse-Philippsthal-Barchfeld; Hanau-Schaumburg (morganatic); Mountbatten (morganatic); Extinct branches: Hesse-Braubach; Hesse-Butzbach; Hesse-Darmstadt; Hesse-Homburg; Hesse-Itter; Hesse-Marburg; Hesse-Philippsthal; Hesse-Rheinfels; Hesse-Rotenburg; Hesse-Wanfried; Battenberg (morganatic)

The House of Hesse is a European dynasty directly descended from the House of Reginar and Brabant. One branch ruled the region of Hesse as prince-electors until 1866, the other branch as grand dukes until 1918.

== History ==
The origins of the House of Hesse begin with the marriage in 1241 of Sophie of Thuringia (daughter of Louis IV, Landgrave of Thuringia, and Elizabeth of Hungary) with Henry II, Duke of Brabant, from the House of Reginar. Sophie was the heiress of Hesse, which she passed on to her son, Henry, upon her retention of the territory following her partial victory in the War of the Thuringian Succession, in which she was one of the belligerents.

Originally the western part of the Landgraviate of Thuringia, in the mid 13th century, it was inherited by the younger son of Henry II, Duke of Brabant, and became a distinct political entity. From the late 16th century, it was generally divided into several branches, the most important of which were those of Hesse-Kassel (or Hesse-Cassel) and Hesse-Darmstadt.

In the early 19th century, the Landgrave of Hesse-Kassel was elevated to Elector of Hesse (1803), while the Landgrave of Hesse-Darmstadt became the Grand Duke of Hesse (1806), later the Grand Duke of Hesse and by Rhine. The Electorate of Hesse (Hesse-Kassel) was annexed by Prussia in 1866, while the Grand Duchy of Hesse (Hesse-Darmstadt) remained a sovereign realm (albeit within the German Empire from 1871) until the end of the German monarchies in 1918.

=== Links ===
- Rulers of Hesse
- Faber-Castell family

== Branches ==
Philip I, Landgrave of Hesse, died in 1567. Hesse was then divided between his four sons, thus four main branches arose: Hesse-Kassel, Hesse-Marburg, Hesse-Rheinfels and Hesse-Darmstadt.

- House of Brabant
  - Hesse (1264–1567)
    - Hesse-Kassel (1567–1866), became Electorate of Hesse in 1803
      - Hesse-Rotenburg (1627–1834)
      - Hesse-Wanfried (1627–1755)
      - Hesse-Rheinfels (1627–1754)
      - Hesse-Eschwege (1632–1657)
      - Hesse-Philippsthal (1685–1866)
        - Hesse-Philippsthal-Barchfeld (1721–1866)
      - Hanau-Schaumburg (1831/1853, morganatic line)
    - Hesse-Marburg (1567, divided in 1604 between Hesse-Darmstadt and Hesse-Kassel)
    - Hesse-Rheinfels (1567, divided in 1583 between Hesse-Darmstadt, Hesse-Kassel and Hesse-Marburg)
    - Hesse-Darmstadt (1567–1918), became Grand Duchy of Hesse in 1806
      - Hesse-Butzbach (1609–1642)
      - Hesse-Braubach (1609–1651)
      - Hesse-Homburg (1622–1866)
      - Hesse-Itter (1661–1676)
      - Battenberg (1858 morganatic line; the British-domiciled branch adopted the anglicized form Mountbatten, a direct English rendering of Battenberg in 1917, while the German-domiciled branch retained Battenberg)

The Battenberg family are morganatic descendants in the male-line of the House of Hesse, issuing from the marriage of Prince Alexander of Hesse and by Rhine with Countess Julia von Hauke who, along with her children and agnatic descendants, were made princes and princesses of Battenberg and Serene Highnesses. The Battenbergs who later settled in England changed that name to Mountbatten after World War I at the behest of George V, who substituted British peerages for their former German princely title. Those descended from the marriage of Alexander of Battenberg, Prince of Bulgaria, contracted with a commoner after the loss of his throne, were granted the title Count von Hartenau.

Hesse-Kassel and its junior lines were annexed by Prussia in 1866. Hesse-Darmstadt became the People's State of Hesse when the monarchy was abolished in 1918. Hesse-Philippsthal died out in the male line in 1925, and Hesse-Darmstadt in 1968. The male-line heirs of Hesse-Kassel and Hesse-Philippsthal-Barchfeld continue to exist to the present day.

== Family tree ==
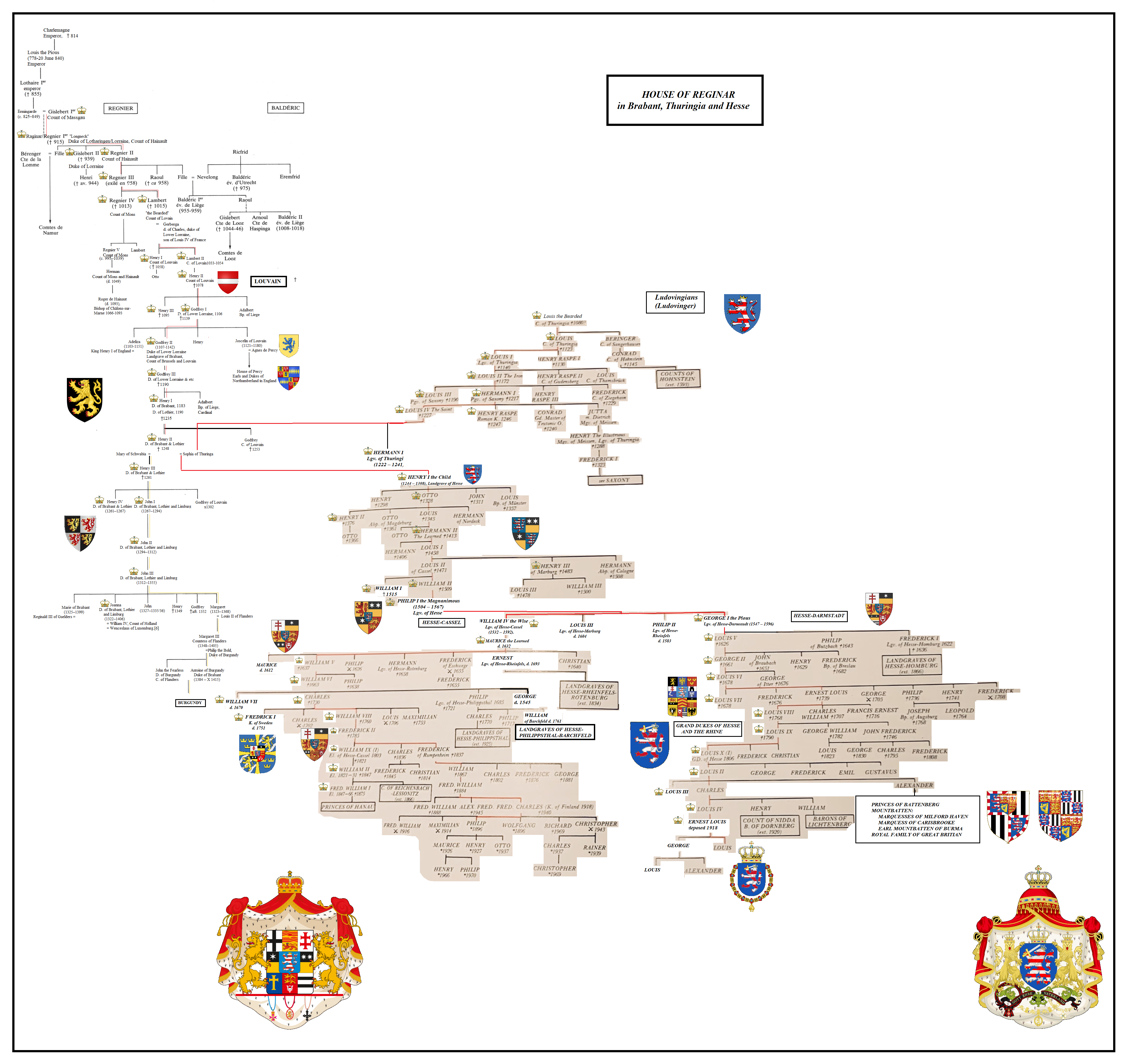
House of Reginar in Lorraine, Brabant, Thuringia and Hesse

== See also ==
- List of rulers of Hesse
