= Electress =

Consort of a Prince-elector of the Holy Roman Empire

An Electress (German: Kurfürstin, Latin: electrix) was the consort of a Prince-elector of the Holy Roman Empire, one of the Empire's greatest princes.

The Golden Bull of 1356 established by Emperor Charles IV settled the number of Electors at seven. However, three of these were Roman Catholic archbishops, and so had no consorts; while of the four secular Electors, one was King of Bohemia, and his consort was always known by the more prestigious title of "Queen of Bohemia". The consorts usually referred to as Electresses, therefore, were:

- The Electress of the Palatinate;
- The Electress of Saxony;
- The Electress of Brandenburg.

To these were added, in 1623 and 1692 respectively:

- The Electress of Bavaria;
- The Electress of Hanover.

In the final years of the Empire, several Electors were added, who only held their offices for less than three years before the Empire's final dissolution. The consorts of these last Electors were:

- The Electress of Württemberg;
- The Electress of Hesse-Kassel.

There was also an Elector of Baden, but the only ruler to use this title was married morganatically and so his spouse did not share his title.

The rulers of Hesse-Kassel continued to use the title of "Elector" until the annexation of the principality by Prussia in 1866.

Persons using or entitled to use the title of "Electress" are listed below. Spouses of Electors in morganatic or unequal marriages are given in a separate table at the bottom of the page.

== Electresses ==
=== Electresses of the Palatinate ===
Name	Image	Father	Born	Married	Became Electress	Ceased to be Electress	Died	Husband
Wittelsbach Dynasty
Elizabeth		John I, Marquis of Namur	1340	1350	1356	1382		Rupert I
Beatrice		William I, Duke of Berg	1360	1385		16 Feb 1390	1395	Rupert I
Elizabeth		Frederick V, Burggrave of Nuremberg	1358	27 Jun 1374	6 Jan 1398	18 May 1410	26 Jul 1411	Rupert III
Matilda		Amadeo, Prince of Achaea	1390	30 Nov 1417		30 Dec 1436	14 May 1438	Louis III
Margaret		Amadeus VIII of Savoy	7 Aug 1420	18 Oct 1445		13 Aug 1449	30 Sep 1479	Louis IV
Margaret		Louis IX, Duke of Bavaria-Landshut	7 Nov 1456	21 Feb 1474	12 Dec 1476	25 Feb 1501		Philip
Sibylle		Albert IV, Duke of Bavaria	16 Jun 1489	23 Feb 1511		18 Apr 1519		Louis V
Dorothea		Christian II of Denmark	10 Nov 1520	26 Sep 1535	16 Mar 1544	26 Feb 1556	20 Sep 1580	Frederick II
Line of Simmern
Marie		Casimir, Margrave of Brandenburg-Bayreuth	13 Oct 1519	12 Jun 1537	12 Feb 1559	31 Oct 1567		Frederick III
Amalia		Gumprecht IV, Count of Neuenahr	c. 1540	25 Apr 1569		26 Oct 1576	10 Apr 1602	Frederick III
Elisabeth		Philip I, Landgrave of Hesse	13 Feb 1539	8 Jul 1560	26 Oct 1576	14 Mar 1582		Louis VI
Anne		Edzard II, Count of East Frisia	26 June 1562	12 Jul 1583		22 Oct 1583	21 Apr 1621	Louis VI
Louise Juliana		William I of Orange	31 Mar 1576	12 Jun 1593		19 Sep 1610	15 Mar 1644	Frederick IV
Elizabeth; Queen of Bohemia		James I of England	19 Aug 1596	14 Feb 1613		23 Feb 1623 deposition	14 Feb 1662	Frederick V
House of Wittelsbach – Bavaria
Elisabeth Renata		Charles III of Lorraine	9 Oct 1574	6 Feb 1595	23 Feb 1623	4 Jan 1635		Maximilian I
Maria Anna		Emperor Ferdinand II	13 Jan 1610	15 Jul 1635		1648	25 Sep 1665	Maximilian I
Name	Image	Father	Born	Married	Became Electress	Ceased to be Electress	Died	Husband

=== Electresses of Saxony ===
Name	Image	Father	Born	Married	Became Electress	Ceased to be Electress	Died	Husband
Ascanian Dynasty
Elizabeth		Otto I, Landgrave of Hesse	?	?	?	6 Dec 1370	15 Nov 1373	Rudolph II
Caecilia		Francis of Carrara, Duke of Padua	?	23 Jan 1367 or 1376		15 May 1388	1430–1434	Wenceslaus I
Anna		Balthasar, Landgrave of Thuringia	?	1387/1389	?	4 Jul 1395		Rudolph III
Barbara		Rupert, Duke of Silesia-Liegnitz	?	6 Mar 1396		11 Jun 1419	17 May 1435	Rudolph III
Euphemia		Conrad II of Silesia	?	14 Jan 1402	11 Jun 1419	12 Nov 1422	1444	Albert
Wettin Dynasty
Katharine		Henry II of Brunswick-Lüneburg	1395	8 Feb 1402	6 Jan 1423	4 Jan 1428	1442	Frederick I
Margaret		Ernest, Duke of Austria	1416/17	3 Jun 1431		7 Sep 1464	12 Feb 1486	Frederick II
Elizabeth		Albert III, Duke of Bavaria	2 Feb 1443	19 Nov 1460	7 Sep 1464	5 Mar 1486		Ernest
Sybille		John III, Duke of Cleves	17 Jan 1512	9 Feb 1527	16 Aug 1532	4 Jun 1547 husband deposed	21 Feb 1554	John Frederick I
Agnes		Philip I, Landgrave of Hesse	31 May 1527	9 Jan 1541	4 Jun 1547	9 Jul 1553	4 Nov 1555	Maurice
Anna		Christian III of Denmark	22 Nov 1532	7 Oct 1548	11 Jul 1553	1 Oct 1585		Augustus
Agnes Hedwig		Joachim Ernest of Anhalt-Dessau	1573	3 Jan 1586		11 Feb 1586	1616	Augustus
Sophia		John George, Elector of Brandenburg	6 Jun 1568	25 Apr 1582	11 Feb 1586	25 Sep 1591	7 Dec 1622	Christian I
Hedwig		Frederick II of Denmark	5 Aug 1581	12 Sep 1602		23 Jun 1611	26 Nov 1641	Christian II
Magdalena Sibylla (1)		Albert Frederick, Duke of Prussia	31 Dec 1586	19 Jul 1607	23 Jun 1611	8 Oct 1656	12 Feb 1659	John George I
Magdalena Sibylla (2)		Christian of Brandenburg-Kulmbach-Bayreuth	1 Nov 1612	13 Nov 1638	8 Oct 1656	22 Aug 1680	20 Mar 1687	John George II
Anna Sophia		Frederick III of Denmark	1 Sep 1647	9 Oct 1666	22 Aug 1680	12 Sep 1691	1 Jul 1717	John George III
Eleonore Erdmuthe Luise		John George I, Duke of Saxe-Eisenach	13 Apr 1662	17 Apr 1692		27 Apr 1694	9 Sep 1696	John George IV
Christiane Eberhardine; Queen of Poland		Christian Ernest, Margrave of Bayreuth	29 Dec 1671	20 Jan 1693	27 Apr 1694	4 Sep 1727		Frederick Augustus I
Maria Josepha; Queen of Poland		Emperor Joseph I	8 Dec 1699	20 Aug 1719	1 Feb 1733	17 Nov 1757		Frederick Augustus II
Maria Antonia Walpurgis Symphorosa		Emperor Charles VII	18 July 1724	20 Jun 1747	5 Oct 1763	17 Dec 1763	23 Apr 1780	Frederick Christian
Maria Amalia Augusta		Frederick Michael of Zweibrücken-Birkenfeld	10 May 1752	29 January 1769		20 Dec 1806 became Queen of Saxony	15 November 1828	Frederick Augustus III
Name	Image	Father	Born	Married	Became Electress	Ceased to be Electress	Died	Husband

=== Electresses of Brandenburg ===
Name	Image	Father	Born	Married	Became Electress	Ceased to be Electress	Died	Husband
Wittelsbach Dynasty
Cunigunde		Casimir III of Poland	1334-5	1 Jan 1352	1356	1357		Louis
Ingeborg		Albert II, Duke of Mecklenburg	1340	15 Feb 1360		17 May 1365	1395	Louis
Catherine		Emperor Charles IV	19 Aug 1342	19 Mar 1366		1373	26 Apr 1395	Otto
Luxemburg Dynasty
Joan		Albert I, Duke of Bavaria	1362	29 Sep 1370	1373	1378	31 Dec 1386	Wenceslaus
Mary		Louis I of Hungary	1371	Oct 1385		1388	17 May 1395	Sigismund
Agnes		Bolko II of Opole	1360?	1374	1388	18 Jan 1411	1413?	Jodocus
Barbara		Hermann II, Count of Celje	1390–1395	1406–1408	18 Jan 1411	30 Apr 1415	11 Jul 1451	Sigismund
Hohenzollern Dynasty
Elizabeth		Frederick, Duke of Bavaria	1383	18 Sep 1401	30 Apr 1415	20 Sep 1440	13 Nov 1442	Frederick I
Catherine		Frederick I, Elector of Saxony	1421	11 June 1441		10 Feb 1470	23 Aug 1476	Frederick II
Anne		Frederick II, Elector of Saxony	7 Mar 1437	12 Nov 1458	10 Feb 1470	11 Mar 1486	31 Oct 1512	Albert III
Margaret		William III, Duke of Luxembourg	1449	25 Aug 1476	11 Mar 1486	9 Jan 1499	13 Jul 1501	John Cicero
Elizabeth		John of Denmark	24 Jun 1485	10 Apr 1502	9 Jan 1499	11 Jul 1535	10 Jun 1555	Joachim I Nestor
Hedwig		Sigismund I of Poland	15 Mar 1513	1 Sep 1535		3 Jan 1571	7 Feb 1573	Joachim II Hector
Sabina		George of Ansbach	12 May 1529	12 Feb 1548	3 Jan 1571	2 Nov 1575		John George
Elizabeth		Joachim Ernest of Anhalt-Dessau	15 Sep 1563	6 Oct 1577		8 Jan 1598	8 Nov 1607	John George
Catherine		John, Margrave of Brandenburg-Küstrin	10 Aug 1549	8 Jan 1570	8 Jan 1598	10 Oct 1602		Joachim Frederick
Eleanor		Albert Frederick, Duke of Prussia	21 Aug 1583	2 Nov 1603		9 Apr 1607		Joachim Frederick
Anne		Albert Frederick, Duke of Prussia	3 Jul 1576	30 Oct 1594	18 Jul 1608	23 Dec 1619	30 Aug 1625	John Sigismund
Elizabeth Charlotte		Frederick IV, Elector Palatine	19 Nov 1597	24 Jul 1616	23 Dec 1619	1 Dec 1640	26 Apr 1660	George William
Louise Henriette; Duchess of Prussia		Frederick Henry, Prince of Orange	7 Dec 1627	7 Dec 1646		18 Jun 1667		Frederick William I
Sophia Dorothea; Duchess of Prussia		Philip of Holstein	28 Sep 1636	14 Jun 1668		29 Apr 1688	6 Aug 1689	Frederick William I
Sophia Charlotte; Queen in Prussia		Ernest Augustus, Elector of Hanover	30 Oct 1668	8 Oct 1684	29 Apr 1688	1 Feb 1705		Frederick III (I)
Sophia Louise; Queen in Prussia		Frederick, Duke of Mecklenburg-Schwerin	6 May 1685	28 Nov 1708		25 Feb 1713	29 Jul 1735	Frederick III (I)
Sophia Dorothea; Queen in Prussia		George I of Great Britain	16 Mar 1687	28 Nov 1706	25 Feb 1713	31 May 1740	28 Jun 1757	Frederick William II (I)
Elizabeth Christine; Queen of Prussia		Ferdinand Albert II of Brunswick	8 Nov 1715	12 Jun 1733	31 May 1740	17 Aug 1786	13 Jan 1797	Frederick IV (II)
Frederica Louise; Queen of Prussia		Ludwig IX of Hesse	16 Oct 1751	14 Jul 1769	17 Aug 1786	16 Nov 1797	25 Feb 1805	Frederick William III (II)
Louise Augusta Wilhelmina Amalie; Queen of Prussia		Charles II of Mecklenburg-Strelitz	10 Mar 1776	24 Dec 1793	16 Nov 1797	1806	9 Jul 1810	Frederick William IV (III)
Name	Image	Father	Born	Married	Became Electress	Ceased to be Electress	Died	Husband

=== Electresses Palatine (junior line) ===
Name	Image	Father	Born	Married	Became Electress	Ceased to be Electress	Died	Husband
Line of Simmern
Charlotte		William V, Landgrave of Hesse-Kassel	20 Nov 1627	22 Feb 1650		14 Apr 1657	26 Mar 1686	Charles I Louis
Wilhelmina Ernestine		Frederick III of Denmark	20 Jun 1650	20 Sep 1671	28 Aug 1680	26 May 1685	22 Apr 1706	Charles II
Line of Neuburg
Elizabeth Amalia Magdalena		George II, Landgrave of Hesse-Darmstadt	20 Mar 1635	3 Sep 1653	26 May 1685	2 Sep 1690	4 Aug 1709	Philip William
Anna Maria Luisa		Cosimo III de' Medici, Grand Duke of Tuscany	11 Aug 1667	5 Jun 1691		8 Jun 1716	18 Feb 1743	John William
Line of Sulzbach
Elizabeth Maria Augusta		Joseph Charles Emmanuel, Prince of Palatinate-Sulzbach	17 Jan 1721	17 Jan 1742	31 Dec 1742	30 Dec 1777 became Electress of Bavaria	17 Aug 1794	Charles IV Theodore
Name	Image	Father	Born	Married	Became Electress	Ceased to be Electress	Died	Husband

=== Electresses of Bavaria ===
Name	Image	Father	Born	Married	Became Electress	Ceased to be Electress	Died	Husband
Wittelsbach Dynasty
Elisabeth Renata		Charles III, Duke of Lorraine	9 Oct 1574	6 Feb 1595	23 Feb 1623	4 Jan 1635		Maximilian I
Maria Anna		Emperor Ferdinand II	13 Jan 1610	15 Jul 1635		27 Sep 1651	25 Sep 1665	Maximilian I
Henriette Adelaide		Victor Amadeus I, Duke of Savoy	6 Nov 1636	8/11 Dec 1650	27 Sep 1651	13 Jun 1676		Ferdinand Maria
Maria Antonia		Emperor Leopold I	1669	15 Jul 1685		24 Dec 1692		Maximilian II
Teresa Kunegunda		John III of Poland	4 Mar 1676	2 Jan 1695		26 Feb 1726	10 Mar 1730	Maximilian II
Maria Amalia; Holy Roman Empress 1742–1745		Emperor Joseph I	22 Oct 1701	5 Oct 1722	26 Feb 1726	20 Jan 1745	11 Dec 1756	Charles Albert
Maria Anna Sophia		Augustus III of Poland	29 Aug 1728	9 Jul 1747		30 Dec 1777	17 Feb 1797	Maximilian III
Elizabeth Maria Augusta		Joseph Charles of Sulzbach	17 Jan 1721	17 Jan 1742	30 Dec 1777	17 Aug 1794		Charles Theodore
Maria Leopoldine of Austria-Este		Ferdinand of Austria	10 Dec 1776	15 Feb 1795		16 Feb 1799	23 Jun 1848	Charles Theodore
Frederica Caroline Wilhelmina		Charles Louis of Baden	13 Jul 1776	9 Mar 1797	16 Feb 1799	1 Jan 1806 became Queen of Bavaria	13 Nov 1841	Maximilian IV

=== Electresses of Hanover ===
Name	Image	Father	Born	Married	Became Electress	Ceased to be Electress	Died	Husband
Hanover
Sophia		Frederick V, Elector Palatine	14 Oct 1630	30 Sep 1658	1692	23 Jan 1698	8 Jun 1714	Ernest Augustus
Wilhelmina Charlotte Caroline; Queen of Great Britain		John Frederick, Margrave of Ansbach	1 Mar 1683	22 Aug 1705	11 Jun 1727	20 Nov 1737		George II
Sophia Charlotte; Queen of Great Britain		Charles Louis Frederick of Mecklenburg-Strelitz	19 May 1744	8 Sep 1761		12 Oct 1814 became Queen of Hanover	17 Nov 1818	George III

=== Electresses of Württemberg and Hesse ===
Name	Image	Father	Born	Married	Became Electress	Ceased to be Electress	Died	Husband
Württemberg
Charlotte Augusta Matilda		George III of the United Kingdom	29 Sep 1766	18 May 1797	25 February 1803	1 Jan 1806 became Queen of Württemberg	5 Oct 1828	Frederick I
Hesse
Wilhelmina Caroline		Frederick V of Denmark	10 July 1747	1 Sep 1764	1803	14 Jan 1820		William I
Augusta Christina Frederica		Frederick William II of Prussia	1 May 1780	13 Feb 1797	27 Feb 1821	19 Feb 1841		William II

== Morganatic spouses of Electors ==
Name	Father	Born	Married	Died	Husband
Clara Tott	?	?	1471	29 Apr 1520	Frederick I, Elector Palatine
Maria Susanna Loysa, Raugravine	Christoph Martin von Degenfeld	28 Nov 1634	6 Jan 1658	18 Mar 1677	Charles I Louis, Elector Palatine
Elizabeth Höllander von Bernau	?	1659	11 Dec 1679	8 Mar 1702	Charles I Louis, Elector Palatine
Violante Maria Theresa, Countess of Thurn and Taxis	Count Philipp-Wilhelm of Thurn and Taxis	1 Apr 1683	1729	2 Nov 1734	Charles III Philip, Elector Palatine
Louise Caroline, Countess of Hochberg	Ludwig Heinrich Philipp Geyer von Geyersberg	26 May 1768	24 Nov 1787	23 Jun 1820	Charles Frederick of Baden
Emilie Ortlöpp, Countess of Reichenbach	Johann Christian Ortlöpp	13 May 1791	8 July 1841	12 Feb 1843	William II, Elector of Hesse
Caroline of Berlepsch, Baroness of Bergen	Hermann Ludwig von Berlepsch	1820	28 Aug 1843	1877	William II, Elector of Hesse
Gertrude, Princess of Hanau	Johann Gottfried Falkenstein	1805	26 June 1831	1882	Frederick William, Elector of Hesse
