= Adolph of Isenburg-Wächtersbach =

Adolph II
- Count of Ysenburg-Büdingen-Wächtersbach
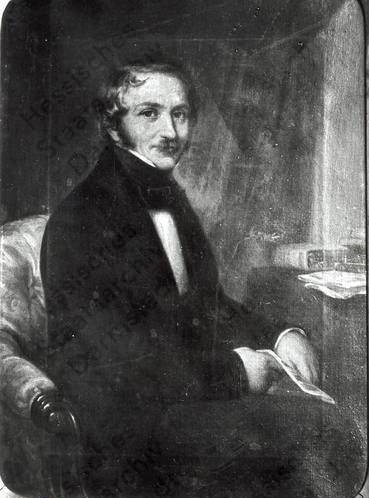
- Reign: 25 February 1821 – 9 October 1847
- Predecessor: Louis Maximilian II, Count of Ysenburg-Büdingen-Wächtersbach
- Successor: Ferdinand Maximilian I, Prince of Ysenburg-Büdingen-Wächtersbach
- Born: 26 July 1795; Wächtersbach
- Died: 22 August 1859 (aged 64); Frankfurt
- Spouse: Countess Philippine zu Ysenburg-Philippseich (m. 1823)
- Issue: Ferdinand Maximilian I, Prince of Ysenburg-Büdingen-Wächtersbach
- House: Isenburg
- Father: Louis Maximilian I of Isenburg-Wächtersbach
- Mother: Countess Auguste zu Sayn-Wittgenstein-Hohenstein

Adolph II of Isenburg-Wächtersbach (26 July 1795 – 22 August 1859) was a German aristocrat, as Count of Isenburg-Wächtersbach.

The county itself lasted from 1673 to 1806 in the central Holy Roman Empire, until it was mediatised to Isenburg.

== Marriage ==
Count Adolph II married Countess Philippine zu Ysenburg-Philippseich (1798–1877) on 14 October 1823 in Philippseich. The couple had one child:

- Ferdinand Maximilian III, Count zu Ysenburg-Büdingen-Wächtersbach (24 October 1824 – 5 June 1903), 1st Prince zu Ysenburg-Büdingen-Wächtersbach, married on 17 July 1849 in Wilhelmshöhe, Countess Auguste von Schaumburg, then Princess Auguste von Hanau (21 September 1829 – 18 September 1887), eldest daughter of Frederick William, Elector of Hesse and his morganatic wife, Gertrude Falkenstein, Countess von Schaumburg, then Princess von Hanau. They had two sons and two daughters.

== Ancestry ==
Ancestors of Adolph of Isenburg-Wächtersbach

8. Ferdinand Maximilian I, Count of Isenburg-Wächtersbach
4. Ferdinand Maximilian II, Count of Isenburg-Wächtersbach
9. Countess Albertine Maria of Sayn-Wittgenstein-Berleburg
2. Louis Maximilian I, Count of Isenburg-Wächtersbach
10. Louis Christian, Count of Stolberg-Gedern
5. Countess Ernestine Wilhelmine of Stolberg-Gedern
11. Duchess Christine of Mecklenburg-Güstrow
1. Adolph II, Count of Ysenburg-Büdingen-Wächtersbach
12. Friedrich, Count of Sayn-Wittgenstein-Hohenstein
6. Johann Ludwig, Count of Sayn-Wittgenstein-Hohenstein
13. Princess Auguste Albertine of Nassau-Siegen
3. Countess Auguste zu Sayn-Wittgenstein-Hohenstein
14. Count Christian Wilhelm Karl of Pückler-Limpurg
7. Countess Friederike of Pückler-Limpurg
15. Countess Karoline Christiane of Löwenstein-Wertheim-Virneburg
