= Friedrich Wilhelm von Hanau-Hořowitz =

German aristocrat (1832–1889)

Frederick William
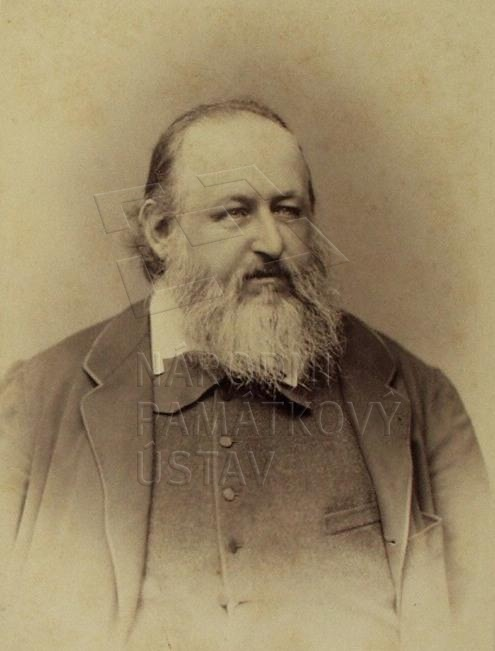
- Born: 4 May 1832; Wilhelmshöhe Palace, Kassel
- Died: 24 March 1889 (aged 56); Zurich District, Switzerland
- Spouse: Auguste Birnbaum (m. 1856; div. 1857) Ludowika Gloede (m. 1875; died 1889)
- Issue: Friedrich August, Prince von Hanau; Ludwig, Prince von Hanau
- House: Hanau-Schaumburg
- Father: Frederick William
- Mother: Gertrude Falkenstein

Friedrich Wilhelm von Hanau-Hořowitz (4 May 1832 – 24 March 1889) was a German aristocrat.

== Early life ==
Prince Friedrich was born at the Wilhelmshöhe Palace in Kassel on 4 May 1832. He was the eldest son of Frederick William, Elector of Hesse (1802–1875), and his morganatic wife, Gertrude Falkenstein (1803–1882), whom he later elevated to Princess of Hanau and Hořowitz (German: Fürstin von Hanau und zu Hořowitz). His father served as Elector of Hesse until the electorate was abolished in 1866.

His paternal grandparents were Prince William, later William II, Elector of Hesse, and Princess Augusta of Prussia (a daughter of King Frederick William II of Prussia). His maternal grandparents were Johann Gottfried Falkenstein and his wife, Magdalena Schulz.

== Career ==
Although his father was Elector of Hesse until the electorate was abolished in 1866 (after which he was exiled to Austria), upon his father's death in 1875, Friedrich Wilhelm and his younger brothers were all excluded from the line of succession due to their parents' morganatic marriage. Therefore, his uncle, Prince Frederick William of Hesse-Kassel, succeeded as titular Elector of Hesse and the Head of the House of Hesse-Kassel.

At their birth, his sons were Counts von Schaumburg, but post-1918, his descendants bear the title Prince and Princess von Hanau.

== Personal life ==
Prince Friedrich was married twice, both times morganatically. His first marriage was to Auguste Anna Birnbaum (1837–1862), an actress at the court theater of Kassel. The daughter of actors Carl Birnbaum and Maria Sargany, she became pregnant and her father threatened to kill Auguste and himself if they didn't marry. They eloped to London where they were married on 23 September 1856 and she became Countess von Schaumburg. Because of his threats, her father was imprisoned and her family exiled and persecuted. Their child was born prematurely and died soon after birth, after which Friedrich Wilhelm abandoned her under pressure from his father. They were divorced soon after. She died of tuberculosis in 1862 in Bad Cannstatt, where they had taken refuge under the protection of King Charles of Württemberg.

His second marriage was to Ludovika Bertha Luise Gloede (1840–1912) on 8 April 1875. Also an actress, she was the daughter of the Rev. Friedrich Gloede and Maria Dorothea Goldbeck. Although married in 1875, he already had two sons with her:

- Friedrich August (1864–1940), who married Hildegard von Zsadány, Countess Almasy, in 1899; m. second, Ernestine Christine Detzer.
- Ludwig Caecilius Felix (1872–1940)

Prince Friedrich died at Hořovice in Beroun District in the Central Bohemian Region (today a part of the Czech Republic) on 24 March 1889.

== Ancestry ==
Ancestors of Friedrich Wilhelm von Hanau-Hořowitz

8. William I, Elector of Hesse
4. William II, Elector of Hesse
9. Princess Wilhelmina Caroline of Denmark
2. Frederick William, Elector of Hesse
10. Frederick William II of Prussia
5. Princess Augusta of Prussia
11. Frederika Louisa of Hesse-Darmstadt
1. Prince Friedrich Wilhelm of Hanau and Hořowitz
12. Nikolaus Falkenstein
6. Gottfried Falkenstein
13. Margarete Heyss
3. Gertrude Falkenstein, Princess of Hanau
14. Johann Ludwig Albert Schulz
7. Marie Magdalene Schulz
15. Sophie Krups
