= Ferdinand Maximilian, Prince of Ysenburg-Büdingen-Wächtersbach =

Ferdinand Maximilian III
- Prince of Ysenburg-Büdingen-Wächtersbach
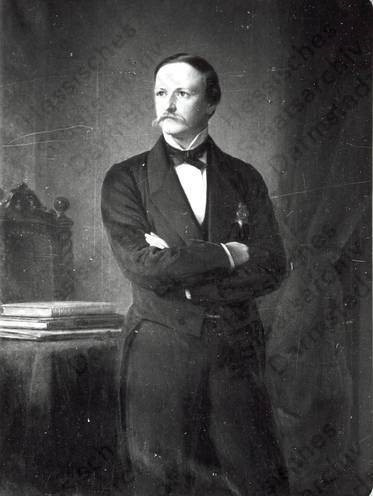
- Reign: 9 October 1847 – 5 June 1903
- Predecessor: Adolph II, Count of Ysenburg-Büdingen-Wächtersbach
- Successor: Friedrich Wilhelm, Prince of Prince of Ysenburg-Büdingen-Wächtersbach
- Born: 24 October 1824; Wächtersbach
- Died: 5 June 1903 (aged 78); Wächtersbach
- Spouse: Princess Auguste of Hanau (m. 1849; died 1887)
- House: Isenburg
- Father: Adolph II, Count of Isenburg-Wächtersbach
- Mother: Countess Philippine zu Ysenburg-Philippseich

Ferdinand Maximilian III of Ysenburg-Wächtersbach (24 October 1824 – 5 June 1903) was the head of the Wächtersbach branch of the House of Ysenburg and the first Prince of Isenburg-Budingen-Wächtersbach.

== Early life ==
Prince Ferdinand Maximilian III was born on 24 October 1824 in Wächtersbach. He was the only child of Adolph II, Count of Isenburg-Wächtersbach and Countess Philippine zu Ysenburg-Philippseich.

His paternal grandparents were Louis Maximilian I of Isenburg-Wächtersbach and Countess Auguste of Sayn-Wittgenstein-Hohenstein. His maternal grandparents were Heinrich Ferdinand, Count of Isenburg-Büdingen-Philippseich and Countess Amalia of Bentheim-Tecklenburg-Rheda.

== Career ==
In 1847, following the death of his father, he became the ruling Count of Isenburg-Wächtersbach. From 1856 to 1903 he was a member of the first chamber of the State Parliament of the Grand Duchy of Hesse, although from 1875 to 1887, he was represented by his son Friedrich Wilhelm. From 1868 to 1885, he was a member of the Kurhessian Municipal Parliament of the Prussian administrative district of Kassel and the provincial parliament of the Prussian Province of Hesse-Nassau.

== Personal life ==
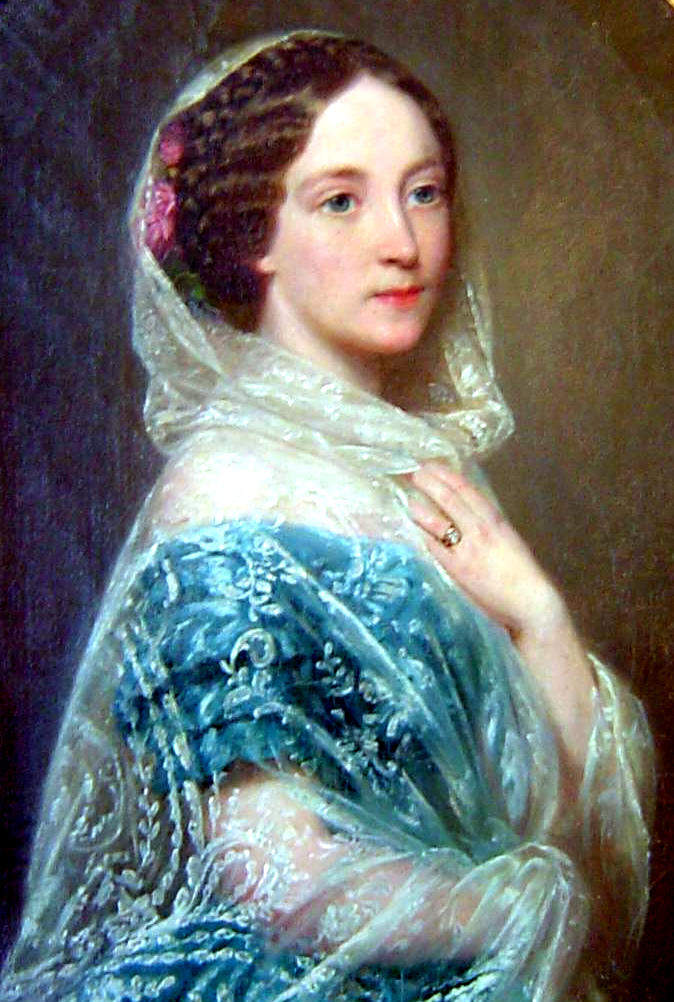
His wife, Princess Auguste von Hanau, c. 1850-60.

On 17 July 1849, he married Countess Auguste Marie Gertrude von Schaumburg, then Princess Auguste von Hanau (1829–1887), in Wilhelmshöhe. Princess Auguste was the eldest daughter of the Frederick William, Elector of Hesse and his morganatic wife, Gertrude Falkenstein, Countess von Schaumburg, then Princess von Hanau. Together, they were the parents of:

- Friedrich Wilhelm (1850–1933), who married Countess Anna Dobrženský von Dobrženitz (1852–1913), in 1879.
- Gertrude Philippine Alexandra Maria Auguste Luise (1855–1932), who married Prince Adalbert of Ysenburg and Büdingen, a son of Ernst Casimir II, Prince of Ysenburg and Büdingen, in 1875. They divorced in 1877 and she married Robert, Baron von Pagenhardt.
- Gerta Auguste (1863–1945), who married Prince Wilhelm of Saxe-Weimar-Eisenach, the eldest son of the Prince Hermann of Saxe-Weimar-Eisenach and Princess Augusta of Württemberg.
- Wilhelm Philipp Otto Maximilian (1867–1904), who assisted Gen. Oskar von Watter; he died unmarried.

His wife died on 18 September 1887. Prince Ferdinand Maximilian III died on 5 June 1903 in Wächtersbach.

== Ancestry ==
Ancestors of Ferdinand Maximilian, Prince of Ysenburg-Büdingen-Wächtersbach

8. Ferdinand Maximilian II, Count of Ysenburg-Büdingen-Wächtersbach
4. Louis Maximilian I, Count of Ysenburg-Büdingen-Wächtersbach
9. Countess Ernestine Wilhelmine of Stolberg-Gedern
2. Adolph II, Count of Ysenburg-Büdingen-Wächtersbach
10. Johann Ludwig, Count of Sayn-Wittgenstein-Hohenstein
5. Countess Auguste zu Sayn-Wittgenstein-Hohenstein
11. Countess Friederike of Pückler-Limpurg
1. Ferdinand Maximilian III, Prince of Ysenburg-Büdingen-Wächtersbach
12. Christian, Count of Ysenburg-Büdingen-Philippseich
6. Heinrich Ferdinand, Count of Isenburg-Büdingen-Philippseich
13. Countess Konstanze Sophie of Sayn-Wittgenstein-Berleburg
3. Countess Philipine of Ysenburg-Büdingen-Philippseich
14. Moritz Casimir II, Count of Bentheim-Tecklenburg
7. Countess Amalia of Bentheim-Tecklenburg-Rheda
15. Countess Helene Charlotte Sophie von Sayn-Wittgenstein-Berleburg
