= Caroline of Berlepsch =

Hessian noble and Electress

Caroline von Berlepsch
- Born: 9 January 1820; Bad Hersfeld
- Died: 21 February 1877 (aged 57); Knauthain (now part of Leipzig)
- Noble family: von Berlepsch
- Spouses: William II, Elector of Hesse (m. 1843; died 1847) Count Charles Adolph von Hohenthal (m. 1851; died 1875)
- Issue: Count Charles Adolph; Count Charles Louis
- Father: Hermann Ludwig von Berlepsch
- Mother: Melusine von Kruse

Caroline von Berlepsch, Countess of Bergen (9 January 1820 – 21 February 1877) was a member of the noble von Berlepsch family and was the third wife of the Elector William II of Hesse-Kassel.

== Early life ==
Caroline was born 9 January 1820 in Bad Hersfeld. She was the daughter of Baron Hermann Ludwig von Berlepsch and Melusine von Kruse.

== Personal life ==
On 28 August 1843, she was married to William II, who was 43 years her senior, in Wilhelmsbad (now part of Hanau). She was his third wife, following the death of his first wife, Princess Augusta of Prussia (the fourth daughter of King Frederick William II of Prussia) in 1841, and his second wife, Countess Emilie of Reichenbach-Lessonitz in 1843. This was a morganatic marriage, because she was considered lesser nobility and therefore not befitting for a sovereign Elector. The couple's main residence was Frankfurt, since the elector had in 1830 and virtually abdicated the government to his son, Frederick William I, from his first, non-morganatic, marriage.

In 1844, the Elector elevated Caroline to the rank of "Baroness of Bergen" and in 1846, she received the Austrian title of "Countess of Bergen".

=== Second marriage ===
After William's death in 1847, she married again, to Count Charles Adolph of Hohenthal (1811–1875) on 28 October 1851 in Frankfurt. Together with Count Charles, who was born in Dölkau, she had two sons:

- Karl Adolph Philipp Wilhelm von Hohenthal (1853–1909)
- Charles Louis von Hohenthal (1857-1915).

Count Charles died on 9 October 1875 in Knauthain. She died 21 February 1877 in Knauthain (now part of Leipzig).
