= Princess Marie Frederica of Hesse-Kassel =

Princess Marie Frederica
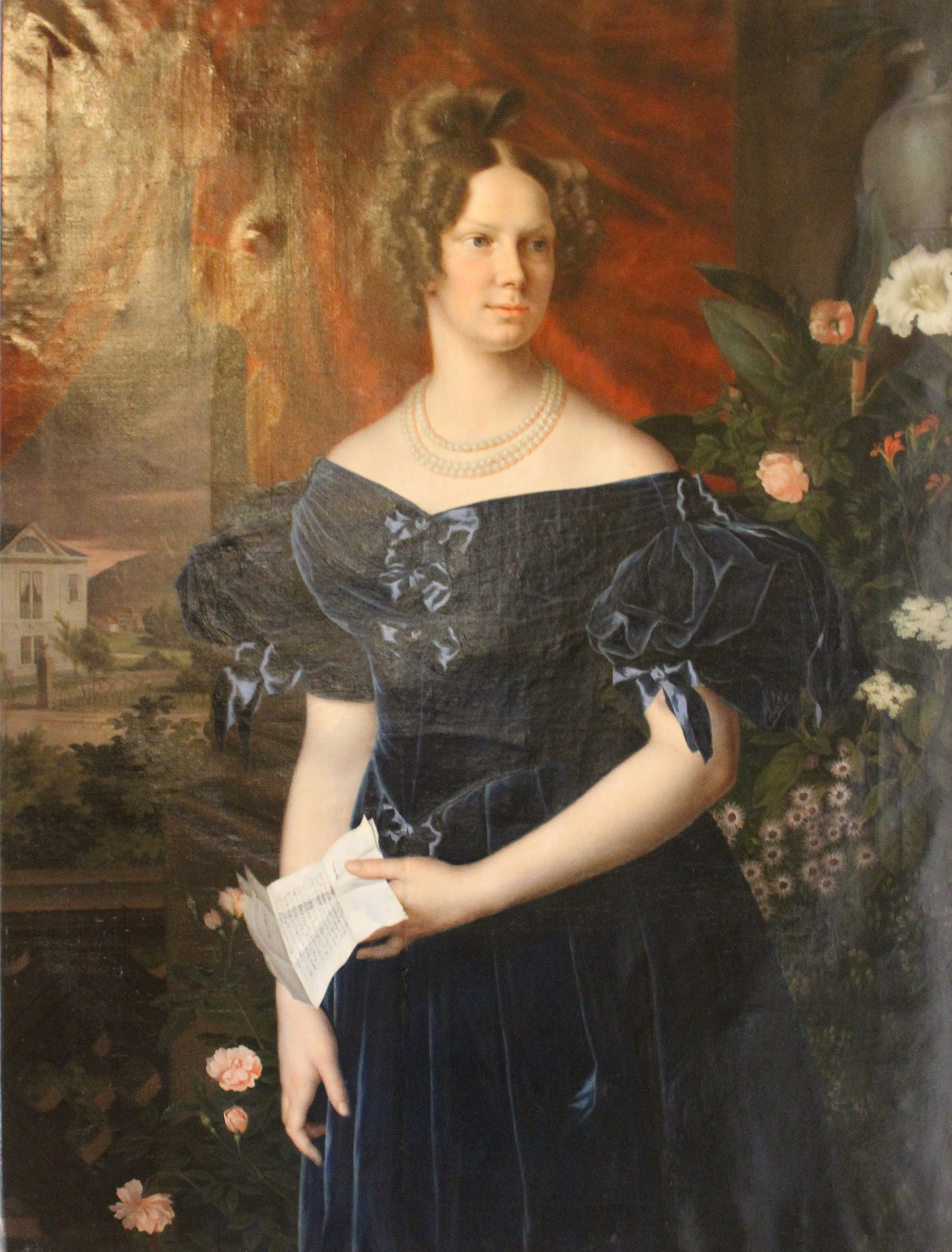
- Portrait, 1830

Duchess consort of Saxe-Meiningen
- Tenure: 23 March 1825 – 20 September 1866
- Born: 6 September 1804; Kassel
- Died: 1 January 1888 (aged 83); Meiningen, Saxe-Meiningen, German Empire
- Spouse: Bernhard II, Duke of Saxe-Meiningen (m. 1825; died 1882)
- Issue: Georg II, Duke of Saxe-Meiningen; Augusta, Princess Moritz of Saxe-Altenburg
Names
- German: Marie Friederike Wilhelmine
- House: Hesse-Kassel
- Father: William II, Elector of Hesse
- Mother: Princess Augusta of Prussia

Princess Marie Frederica Wilhelmina of Hesse-Kassel (6 September 1804 – 1 January 1888) was a Duchess consort of Saxe-Meiningen by marriage to Bernhard II, Duke of Saxe-Meiningen. She was the daughter of William II, Elector of Hesse and Princess Augusta of Prussia.

== Life ==
Marie Frederica was one of six children born to William II, Elector of Hesse by his first spouse Augusta of Prussia. However, her only sibling to live past the age of five was Frederick William, Elector of Hesse. In addition, she had eight half-siblings by her father's second marriage to Emilie Ortlöpp, Countess of Reichenbach-Lessonitz.

=== Duchess ===
In 1822, Marie, through the suggestion of her mother's friend, the Swedish countess Charlotta Aurora De Geer, was considered a possible bride for Oscar I of Sweden, but the following year, he married Josephine of Leuchtenberg instead.

On 23 March 1825, Marie married Bernhard II, Duke of Saxe-Meiningen. He was a son of Georg I Frederick Karl, Duke of Saxe-Meiningen and Luise Eleonore of Hohenlohe-Langenburg, as well as a brother of Queen Adelaide of the United Kingdom. He and Marie had two surviving children. Her son Georg would remain an only child for seventeen years until the birth of his sister Augusta in 1843.

Marie Frederica was widowed in 1882 and died on 1 January 1888, six years later.

== Issue ==
Name	Birth	Death	Notes
Georg II, Duke of Saxe-Meiningen	2 April 1826	25 June 1914	married (1) Princess Charlotte of Prussia; had issue (2) Princess Feodora of Hohenlohe-Langenburg; had issue (3) Ellen Franz; no issue
Princess Augusta Luise Adelaide Karoline Ida	6 August 1843	11 November 1919	married Prince Moritz of Saxe-Altenburg

== Ancestry ==
Ancestors of Princess Marie Frederica of Hesse-Kassel

16. William VIII, Landgrave of Hesse-Kassel
8. Frederick II, Landgrave of Hesse-Kassel
17. Princess Dorothea Wilhelmine of Saxe-Zeitz
4. William I, Elector of Hesse
18. George II of Great Britain
9. Princess Mary of Great Britain
19. Princess Caroline of Brandenburg-Ansbach
2. William II, Elector of Hesse
20. Christian VI of Denmark
10. Frederick V of Denmark
21. Princess Sophie Magdalene of Brandenburg-Kulmbach
5. Princess Wilhelmina Caroline of Denmark
22. George II of Great Britain (= 18)
11. Princess Louise of Great Britain
23. Princess Caroline of Brandenburg-Ansbach (= 19)
1. Princess Marie Frederica of Hesse-Kassel
24. Frederick William I of Prussia
12. Prince Augustus William of Prussia
25. Princess Sophia Dorothea of Hanover
6. Frederick William II of Prussia
26. Ferdinand Albert II, Duke of Brunswick-Wolfenbüttel
13. Duchess Luise of Brunswick-Wolfenbüttel
27. Duchess Antoinette of Brunswick-Wolfenbüttel
3. Princess Augusta of Prussia
28. Louis VIII, Landgrave of Hesse-Darmstadt
14. Louis IX, Landgrave of Hesse-Darmstadt
29. Countess Charlotte of Hanau-Lichtenberg
7. Princess Frederica Louisa of Hesse-Darmstadt
30. Christian III, Count Palatine of Zweibrücken
15. Countess Palatine Caroline of Zweibrücken
31. Countess Caroline of Nassau-Saarbrücken

== Sources ==
- Koller, Ann Marie (1984). The Theater Duke: George II of Saxe-Meiningen and the German Stage. Stanford University Press. ISBN 0-8047-1196-8.

Princess Marie Frederica of Hesse-Kassel House of Hesse-Kassel Born: 6 September 1804 Died: 1 January 1888
German royalty
Preceded by Luise Eleonore of Hohenlohe-Langenburg	Duchess consort of Saxe-Meiningen; 1825-1866	Succeeded by Feodora of Hohenlohe-Langenburg
