= William II of Hesse =

William II of Hesse may refer to:

- William II, Landgrave of Hesse (1469–1509)
- William II, Elector of Hesse (1777–1847)
