= Charlotta Aurora De Geer =

Swedish countess, salonist and courtier

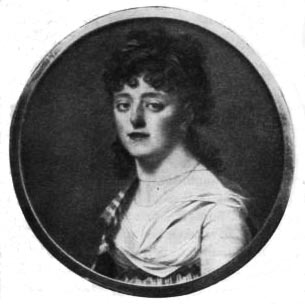
Charlotta Aurora De Geer

Charlotta Aurora De Geer later Gyldenstolpe and Wetterstedt (1779–1834), was a politically influential Swedish countess, salonist and courtier.

== Life ==
=== Courtier ===
Born to the royal court chamberlain baron Johan Jakob De Geer af Finspång and Fredrika Aurora Taube. She served as hovfröken to Princess Charlotte until her marriage in 1796; statsfru to the queen, Frederica of Baden, in 1800–1809, and överhovmästarinna to queen dowager Charlotte in 1818. During her tenure as courtier of Frederica, she appears to have been somewhat favored: she was one of the two ladies-in-waiting chosen to accompany the queen to Finland in 1802 (with countess Christina Frölich) and to Germany in 1803–1805 (with countess Caroline Oxenstierna).

=== Salonist ===
On 12 April 1796 in Stockholm Castle she married her relative, Major General and governor Count Nils Gyldenstolpe. She divorced in 1810, and married the politician count Gustaf af Wetterstedt in 1811. Charlotta Aurora De Geer was described as a beautiful wit, and belonged to the leading central figures of the Swedish capital's society in the first decades of the 19th century. She hosted a salon which functioned as a political forum, and were King Charles XIII of Sweden, was a frequent guest, as was Prince William Frederick, Duke of Gloucester and Edinburgh, during his visit to Sweden in 1801–02. She influenced politics herself by making her salon a forum for political discussions, as a 19th-century author described it: "Through the wife of count Wetterstedt, the society life in his home became the most sophisticated and interesting, and foreigners frequented it more than many others widely known. The countess was widely amused by state affairs and often exposed the lions of the opposition to criticism; at least many spoke her little of the fact that he voted with the opposition, so as not to be forgotten in the next invitation by this shining hostess."

=== The affair of the crown prince ===
She belonged to the intimate circle of friends around the king and crown prince in the early 1820s, where she, Gustaf Lagerbielke, Mariana Koskull and the wife of the Dutch ambassador were prominent members of the French language amateur theater at Rosersberg Palace. During this period, she introduced her daughter Jaquette Löwenhielm to this intimate circle. When her daughter and crown prince Oscar became lovers, she prevented her son-in-law from removing her daughter from court: her son-in-law commented that whether she was truly unknowing or just pretended not to know, she nevertheless refused to prevent or stop it and by her actions rather ensured that the love affair could continue.

=== The marriage of the crown prince ===
When the marriage of the crown prince was to be arranged, she contributed to the list of candidates. While baron von Böhnen spoke in favor of Josephine of Leuchtenberg, whom he managed to include as number two on the list, De Geer pointed out that the father of Leuchtenberg was a mere titular monarch and related through the queen of Bavaria to the deposed Swedish queen Frederica of Baden, and that the queen of Bavaria had plans to reinstate her nephew in the Swedish succession. Instead, she promoted Princess Marie Frederica of Hesse-Kassel, daughter of her personal friend Augusta of Prussia, who favored the match, and managed to have her listed as number three. When Oscar and his entourage made a trip through Germany in 1822–23 to meet prospective brides, Charlotta Aurora De Geer arranged for her spouse and son-in-law to accompany him. Prior to the official trip of prince Oscar, however, baron von Böhnen visited Hesse and informed the electress Augusta that the Bernadotte dynasty could be deposed at any moment and that Sweden had further more deposed or murdered its latest regents. Shortly thereafter, Charlotta Aurora De Geer arrived to Hesse and informally made a proposal on behalf of the crown prince. She was given a negative reply, which made the entourage of Oscar to decide against a visit to Hesse and instead continue from Copenhagen directly to Leuchtenberg.
