= Hesse-Kassel vereinsthaler =

Currency of the Electorate of Hesse-Kassel, 1858–1873

The Vereinsthaler was the currency of the Electorate of Hesse-Kassel (or Hesse-Cassel) between 1858 and 1873. It replaced the Thaler at par and was replaced by the German Mark at a rate of 1 Vereinsthaler = 3 Mark.

The Vereinsthaler was subdivided into 30 Silbergroschen, each of 12 Heller.
