= Louis Maximilian I of Isenburg-Wächtersbach =

Louis Maximilian I
- Count of Ysenburg-Büdingen-Wächtersbach
- Reign: 19 April 1798 – 23 June 1805
- Predecessor: Adolph I, Count of Ysenburg-Büdingen-Wächtersbach
- Successor: Louis Maximilian II, Count of Ysenburg-Büdingen-Wächtersbach
- Born: 28 August 1741; Wächtersbach
- Died: 23 June 1805 (aged 63); Wächtersbach
- Spouse: Countess Auguste of Sayn-Wittgenstein-Hohenstein (m. 1789)
- Issue: Louis Maximilian II, Count of Ysenburg-Büdingen-Wächtersbach; Adolph II, Count of Ysenburg-Büdingen-Wächtersbach
- House: Isenburg
- Father: Ferdinand Maximilian II, Count of Isenburg-Wächtersbach
- Mother: Countess Ernestine Wilhelmine of Stolberg-Gedern

Louis Maximilian I of Isenburg-Wächtersbach was a German count of Isenburg-Wächtersbach from 1798 to 1805. The county itself lasted from 1673 to 1806 in the central Holy Roman Empire, until it was mediated to Isenberg. He was also a descendant of Ferdinand Maximilian I of Isenburg-Wächtersbach.

== Ancestry ==
Ancestors of Louis Maximilian I of Isenburg-Wächtersbach

8. Johann Ernst I, Count of Isenburg-Büdingen
4. Ferdinand Maximilian I, Count of Isenburg-Wächtersbach
9. Countesd Maria Charlotte of Erbach-Erbach
2. Ferdinand Maximilian II, Count of Isenburg-Wächtersbach
10. Count Georg Wilhelm of Sayn-Wittgenstein-Berleburg
5. Countess Albertine Maria of Sayn-Wittgenstein-Berleburg
11. Amelie Marguerite de La Place
1. Louis Maximilian I, Count of Isenburg-Wächtersbach
12. Henry Ernest, Count of Stolberg
6. Louis Christian, Count of Stolberg-Gedern
13. Countess Anna Elisabeth of Stolberg-Ortenberg
3. Countess Ernestine Wilhelmine of Stolberg-Gedern
14. Gustav Adolph, Duke of Mecklenburg-Güstrow
7. Duchess Christine of Mecklenburg-Güstrow
15. Duchess Magdalena Sibylla of Holstein-Gottorp
