= Gertrude von Hanau =

Gertrude Falkenstein
- Princess of Hanau and Hořowitz
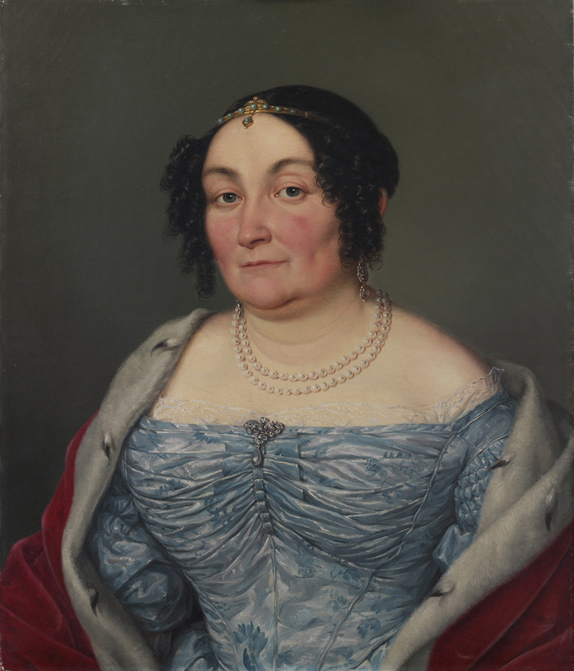
- Portrait, 1865
- Born: 18 May 1803; Bonn, Rhineland, Prussia
- Died: 9 July 1882 (aged 79); Prague, Bohemia, Cisleithania, Austria-Hungary
- Spouse: Frederick William, Elector of Hesse (m. 1831; died 1875)
- Issue: Princess Augusta of Hanau and Hořowitz; Princess Alexandrine of Hanau and Hořowitz; Prince Friedrich Wilhelm of Hanau and Hořowitz; Prince Moritz of Hanau and Hořowitz; Prince Wilhelm of Hanau and Hořowitz; Princess Maria of Hanau and Hořowitz; Prince Karl of Hanau and Hořowitz; Prince Heinrich of Hanau and Hořowitz; Prince Philipp of Hanau and Hořowitz
- Father: Gottfried Falkenstein
- Mother: Marie Magdalene Schulz

Princess Gertrude of Hanau and Hořowitz (née Falkenstein; 18 May 1803 – 9 July 1882), was a German aristocrat. She was the morganatic wife of Frederick William, Elector of Hesse.

== Biography ==
Gertrude Falkenstein was the daughter of an apothecary from Bonn. She was the divorced (ca. 1830/31) wife of Prussian Oberleutnant Karl Michael Lehmann (16 June 1787, Bischofswerder – 1882) and had two sons by him, who were given the name "von Hertingshausen" in 1835, and then "von Scholley" in 1837, and were created Barons (Freiherren) von Scholley in 1846.

Elector William II made her Countess of Schaumburg (with the style of Illustrious Highness), upon her Catholic conversion to the Reformed faith and her marriage on 26 June 1831 with Frederick William, and her then-husband (last Prince-Elector from 1847 to 1866) made her Princess (Fürstin) of Hanau and to Hořowitz in 1853 (with the style of Serene Highness in 1862).

Gertrud and Frederick William had nine children, some born before marriage, who were also made count/esse/s (Grafen) of Schaumburg with the style of Illustrious Highness, then prince/sse/s (Prinzen) of Hanau in 1853 and granted the style of Serene Highness in 1862:

- Augusta Marie Gertrude (1829–1887), married 1849 Ferdinand Maximilian III Prince (Fürst) zu Isenburg-Büdingen-Wächtersbach (1824–1903). They were the grandparents of Princess Sophie of Saxe-Weimar-Eisenach.
- Alexandrine (1830–1871), married 1851 Prince Felix zu Hohenlohe-Oehringen (1818–1900)
- Friedrich Wilhelm (1832–1889), married twice morganatically 1856 Auguste Birnbaum (1837–1862; no children) and 1875 Bertha Ludowika Gloede (daughter of Dr. Friedrich Gottlieb Christian Gloede, Pastor of Altenwalde); their two sons were Counts von Schaumburg, but post-1918 they assume with their descendants the title Prince/ss von Hanau.
- Moritz (1834–1889), married morganatically 1875 Anne von Loßberg (1829–1876); no children.
- Wilhelm (1836–1902), married 1stly 1866 (divorced 1868) Princess Elisabeth von Schaumburg-Lippe, daughter of George William, Prince of Schaumburg-Lippe; 2ndly 1890 Countess Elisabeth zur Lippe-Weissenfeld (1868–1952), daughter of Count Franz zu Lippe-Weissenfeld (1820-1880); who served as General in the Royal Saxon Army; no children.
- Maria (1839–1917), married 1857 (divorced 1872) Prince William of Hesse-Philippsthal-Barchfeld (1831–1890); the Grand Duke of Hesse-Darmstadt regarded their marriage as morganatic and refused to acknowledge their offspring as Hessian princes; she and her children were granted the titles Prince/ss of Ardeck after her divorce.
- Karl (1840–1905), married 1882 Countess Hermine Grote (1859-1939); no children.
- Heinrich (1842–1917), married morganatically 1917 Martha Riegel; no children.
- Philipp (1844–1914), married morganatically 1875 Albertine Hubatschek-Stauber; their children bear the title Count/ess von Schaumburg.

Gertrud von Hanau was given several titles, which her children could inherit, but her irregular status barred her children from inheriting full entitlement and recognition of their princely rights by the brotherly Grand Duchy of Hesse (still-reigning and not annexed like the Electorate of Hesse following the Austro-Prussian War). Most courts refused to grant her the courtesies afforded those of noble birth, a situation which put some stress on her marriage and led to an isolation of the court.

In 1867, Gertrude von Hanau, her husband and their six sons left the former Electorate of Hesse-Cassel and went in exile at Hořowitz Castle, in Bohemia where the princely title of Hanau was recognized by the Austrian imperial authorities since March 1855. The deposed Elector Frederick William died on 6 January 1875 and bequeathed his immense fortune to her, his widow, and to their children.

Gertrude von Hanau died in Prague on 9 July 1882, at the age of 79.

== General sources ==
- Philipp Losch: Die Fürstin von Hanau und ihre Kinder. In: Hanauer Geschichtsblätter 13 (1939), S. 28–38.
