= Hesse-Kassel thaler =

The North German thaler was the currency of the Landgravate, then Electorate of Hesse-Kassel (or Hesse-Cassel) until 1858. Until 1807, the Thaler was subdivided into 32 Albus, each of 12 Heller. It was worth 3/4th a Conventionsthaler from 1754 to 1841.

Between 1807 and 1813, the Westphalian Thaler and Westphalian Frank circulated in Hesse-Kassel.

The Thaler and Heller were reintroduced in 1813, but without the Albus (the last coins denominated in Albus were issued in 1782). Thus, 384 Heller = 1 Thaler. In 1819, the Thaler was set equal to the Prussian Thaler. In 1841, a new currency system was introduced, dividing the Thaler into 30 Silbergroschen, each of 12 Heller.

The Thaler was replaced at par by the Vereinsthaler.
