= Countess Louise von Bose =

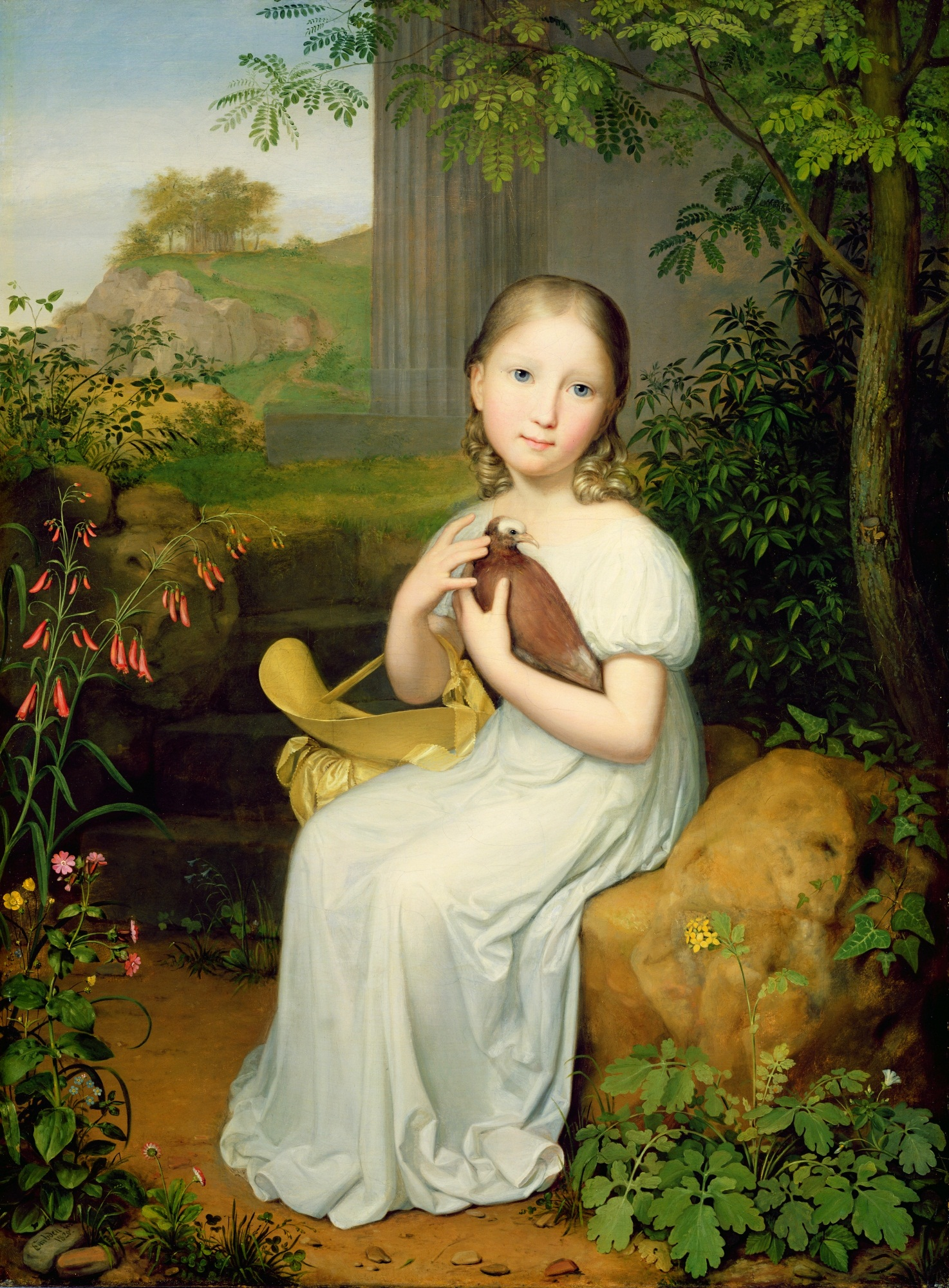
- Louise as a child (Portrait in the New Gallery; Kassel, Germany)
- Known for: Benefactress of the poor, and patron of the arts and sciences
- Born: Louise Wilhelmine Emilie; 1813
- Died: 1883 (aged 69–70)
- Noble family: von Reichenbach-Lessonitz
- Spouses: Carl August, Count von Bose
- Father: William II, Elector of Hesse
- Mother: Emilie Ortlöpp

Louise Wilhelmine Emilie, Countess von Bose, born Countess von Reichenbach-Lessonitz (1813–1883) was a benefactress of the poor and patron of the arts and sciences, particularly the natural sciences. She was the oldest of eight children of Wilhelm II of Hesse-Kassel and his second wife Countess Emilie of Reichenbach-Lessonitz. Louise was a favorite of her father who, it is said, appreciated her intelligence and loving, happy nature.

== Biography ==
She married Carl August, Count von Bose (1814–1887) in 1845 and the couple lived in Frankfurt, Wiesbaden and Baden-Baden. Louise inherited a vast fortune from her mother, Emilie, Countess von Reichenbach-Lessonitz, the daughter of gold merchant Johann Christian Ortlöpp. The estate was valued at 48 million marks at the time of her death, an amount equivalent to billions of dollars in today's economy, and was divided equally among Louise and her six surviving siblings.

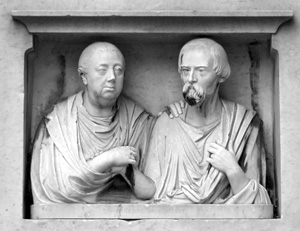
Louise and Karl von Bose (Bose Memorial on the Luisenstrasse in Kassel. The monument bears the inscription Know Thyself)

Count and Countess von Bose established numerous foundations, including a grant of 733,500 goldmarks to Humboldt University, Berlin's oldest institution of higher learning. The endowment was to be used for medical research, both through scholarships to medical students, and for travel grants and assistance to active physicians. Count and Countess von Bose provided substantial funding for the education of underprivileged and neglected children in Kassel, Louise's childhood home, and established The Children's Hospital of Brabant (destroyed in 1943), which cared for Hessian teachers, widows and orphans. They were benefactors of the Senckenberg Natural Research Society in Frankfurt, and the Countess Louise von Bose Foundation funded the creation of the Dental Institute at the University of Marburg. The Bose Museum on Luisenstrasse (Louise Street) in Kassel is named for her, as is the girls' school (Luisenschule) she established in 1855, and which remains active today.

The Louise von Bose Foundation passed to the city of Kassel upon her death, and included her extensive art collection, which later formed the core of the New Gallery collection, along with other personal mementos, furniture and documents.

== Ancestry ==
Ancestors of Countess Louise von Bose

Wilhelm VIII, Landgrave of Hesse-Kassel
Frederick II, Landgrave of Hesse
Dorothea Wilhelmine of Saxe-Zeitz
Wilhelm I, Elector of Hesse
George II, King of Great Britain
Princess Mary of Great Britain
Caroline of Brandenburg-Ansbach
Wilhelm II, Elector of Hesse
Christian VI, King of Denmark
Frederick V, King of Denmark
Sophia Magdalen of Brandenburg-Kulmbach
Wilhelmina Caroline of Denmark and Norway
George II, King of Great Britain
Princess Louise of Great Britain
Caroline of Brandenburg-Ansbach
Countess Louise Wilhelmine von Bose
Johann Christian Ortlöpp
Emilie, Countess von Reichenbach-Lessonitz
Agnes Louise Sophie Weissenberg
