= Friedrich Maximilian Hessemer =

German architect

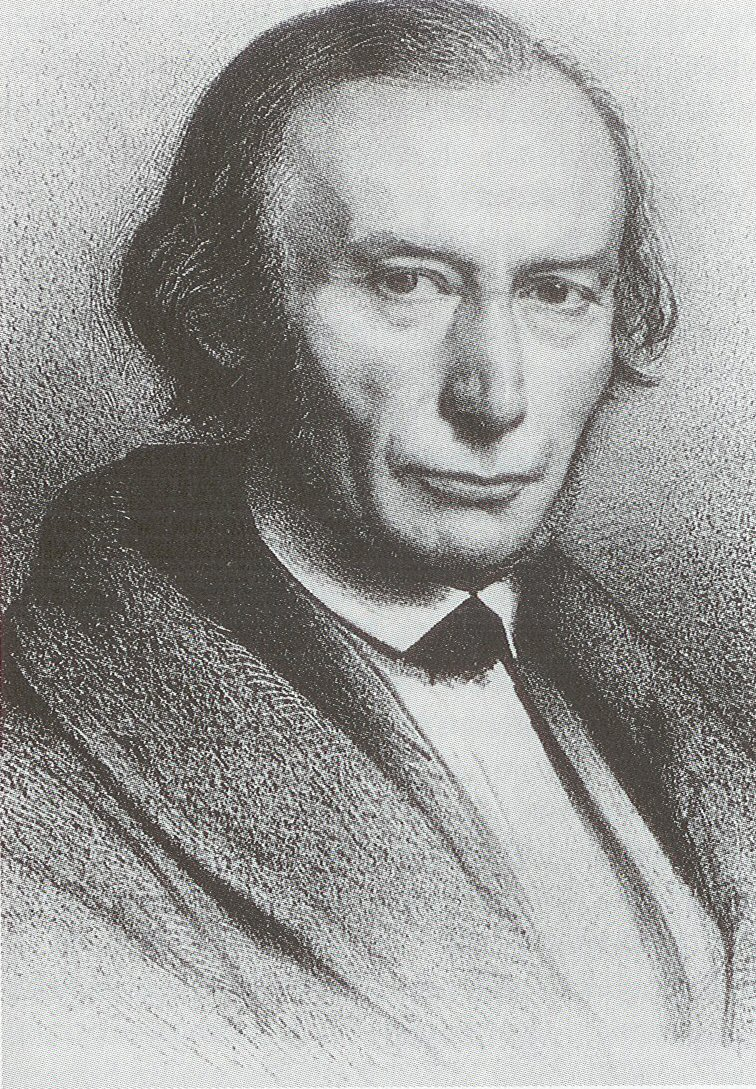
Friedrich Hessemer (c.1850)

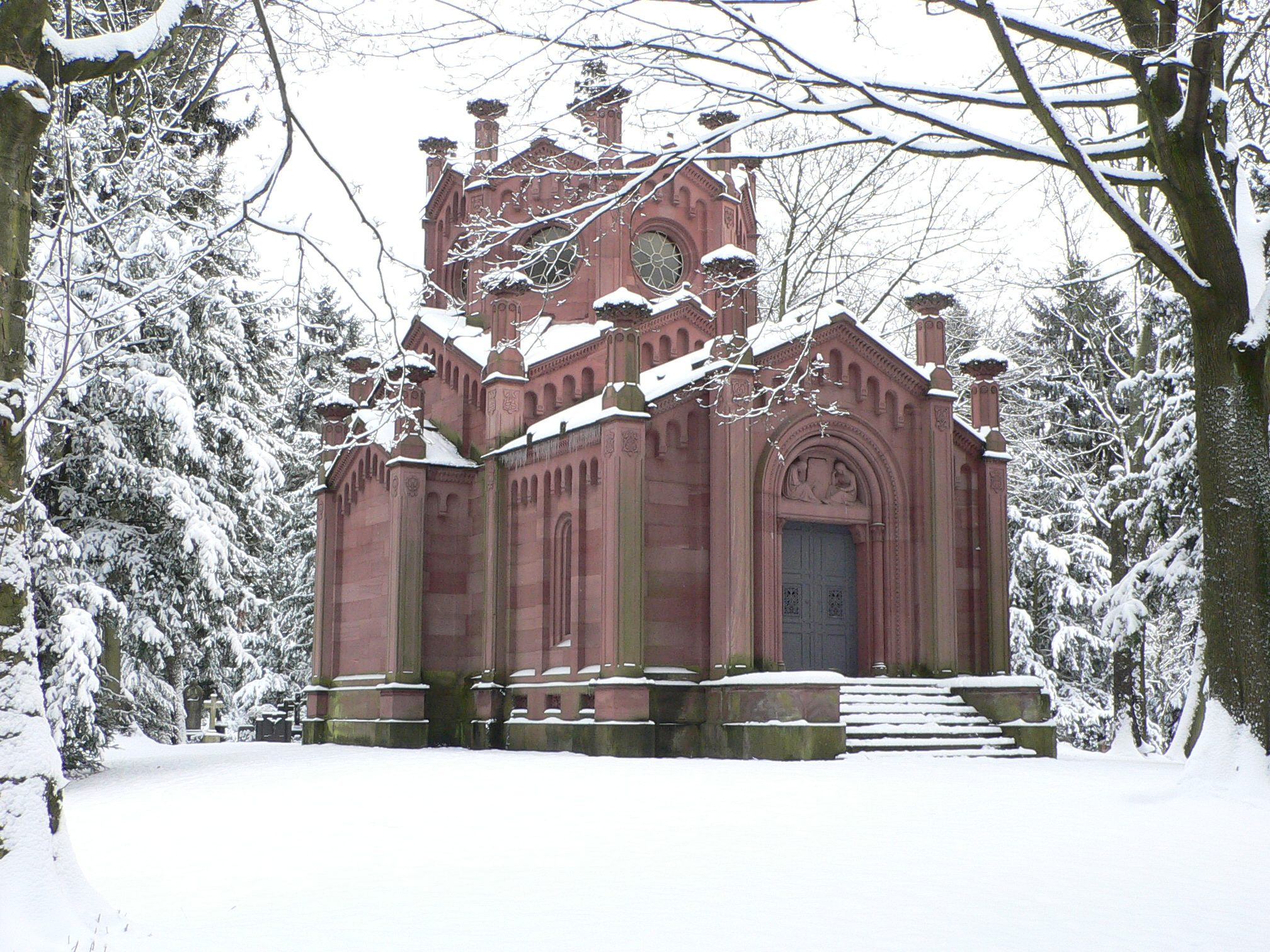
The Mausoleum of Countess von Reichenbach (built 1845-47)

Friedrich Maximilian Hessemer (24 February 1800 in Darmstadt – 1 December 1860 in Frankfurt am Main) was a German architect and writer.

== Life ==
His father was Bernhard Hessemer, the Baurat (building commissioner) of Hesse. He spent several years at the local Gymnasium, but did not graduate, following instead his father's wishes that he join the Grand Ducal Artillery. In military school, he showed a special interest in mathematics. He later spent two years at the University of Gießen, studying science and philosophy. In 1817, he was a participant in the "Wartburg Festival". His cousins Adolf Ludwig, Karl and Paul Follen were among the movement's leaders. He began writing while at Geißen, producing mostly poems at first. When he returned to Darmstadt, he took up the study of architecture.

After completing his training in 1827, he embarked on a two-year study trip to Italy. While in Rome, he learned that he had been accepted as a teacher at the Städelschule in Frankfurt, but was allowed to extend his study trip with a visit to Egypt. He returned with hundreds of drawings of Arabic art and architecture and took up his duties in August 1830. A year later, he became a member of the Masonic Lodge.

In 1838, he refused an offer from the Dresden University of Technology and remained at the Städelschule for the rest of his life. His grave in the Frankfurter Hauptfriedhof is next to one of his best-known works, the Mausoleum of Countess Emilie von Reichenbach-Lessonitz. In 1842, Hessemer drew many examples of Cosmati mosaics in Venice, Sickly and Naples.

== Selected writings ==
=== Architecture ===
- Historic Designs and Patterns in Color from Arabic and Italian Sources, Dover (1990) ISBN 0-486-26425-4
- Das Fahrtor (an old city gate in Frankfurt; demolished in 1840), in: Archiv für Frankfurter Geschichte und Kunst (AFGK) No.1, 1839
- Der Pfarrthurm in Bezug auf seinen ästhetischen Charakter und in Berücksichtigung seines weiteren Ausbaues (The Parish Tower of Frankfurt Cathedral, its aesthetic character in light of its extensions), in: AFGK No.3, 1844

=== Poetry ===
- Jussuf und Nafisse, a narrative poem in oriental style (1847). Reissued by the Nabu Press (2012) ISBN 1-2862-3010-1
- Lieder der unbekannten Gemeinde (Songs of the Unknown Congregation), Leipzig, F.A.Brockhaus (1854), reissued by the Nabu Press (2012) ISBN 1-2790-4282-6
- Ring und Pfeil (Ring and Arrow) (1859), a novel in verse

=== Travel letters ===
- Briefe seiner Reise nach Italien, Malta und Ägypten, 1827-1830, 5 vols., Maximilian Gesellschaft, Hamburg, (2002–03)
