= Emilie Ortlöpp =

German noblewoman

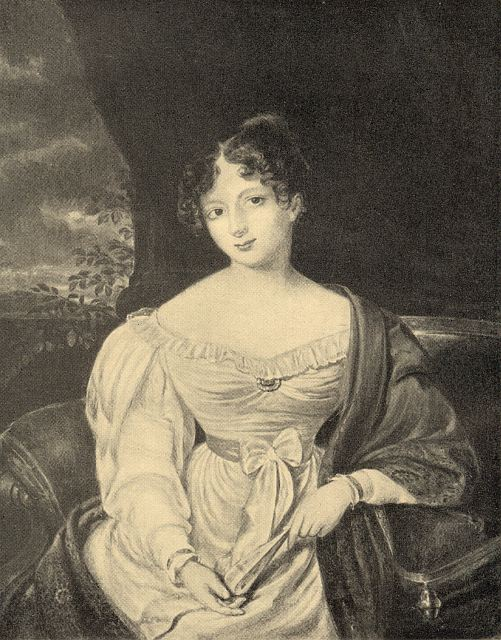
- Emilie Ortlöpp, Countess of Reichenbach-Lessonitz, portrait by L. Grünbaum, c. 1825
- Born: 13 May 1791; Berlin
- Died: 12 February 1843 (aged 51); Frankfurt
- Noble family: von Reichenbach-Lessonitz
- Spouse: William II, Elector of Hesse (m. 1841)
- Father: Johann Christian Ortlöpp
- Mother: Agnes Louise Sophie Weißenberg

Countess Emilie of Reichenbach-Lessonitz née Ortlöpp (13 May 1791 in Berlin – 12 February 1843 in Frankfurt) was the mistress and later second wife of Elector William II of Hesse.

== Life ==
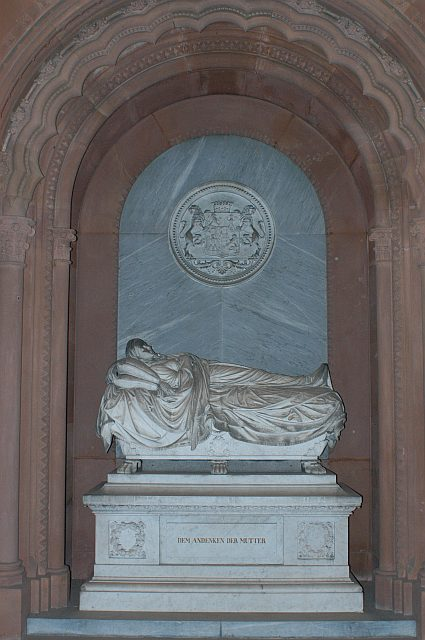
Sarcophagus at Frankfurt Main Cemetery

Emilie was the second daughter of the goldsmith Johann Christian Ortlöpp and his wife Agnes Louise Sophie, née Weißenberg from Berlin, and from 1812, the mistress of the Elector William II of Hesse, whom she had met during a stay in Berlin. He brought her to Kassel in 1813, leading to a de facto termination of his marriage with Princess Augusta of Prussia, but for political reasons, he was not allowed to divorce his wife. In 1815, William and Augusta were separated from bed and board.

Emilie was admitted at court, and later lived in the Reichenbach Palace at the corner of Königsstraße and Friedrichsplatz. In 1821, William raised her to the title of Countess Reichenbach (named after Reichenbach Castle in Hessisch Lichtenau) and in 1824, she received the Austrian title of Countess of Lessonitz after William had purchased the Moravian estates of Lessonitz, Bzenec and Dolní Moštěnice for her. At the same time she and her children received the Austrian citizenship.

Their relationship caused a scandal; they even received death threats. The Countess was probably unpopular and was alleged to have had a negative impact on William's politics, or at least some of his political failures were attributed to her.

Their relationship was one of the reasons why William did not return to his capital Kassel after the 1830 revolution. He initially moved to Hanau and later to Frankfurt, where he acquired a palace in the Neue Mainzer Straße and later a garden house in the Gallus district.

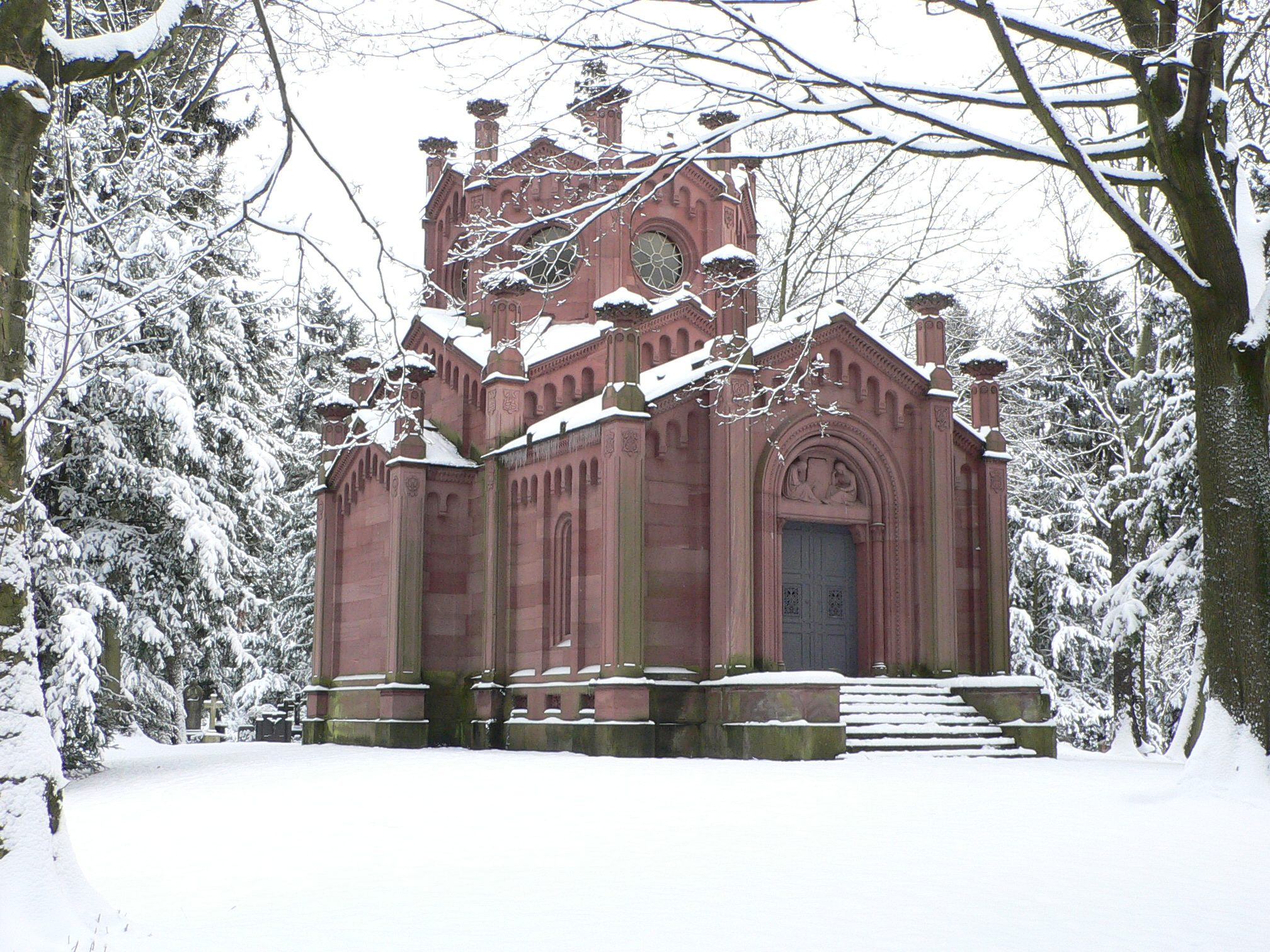
Reichenbach-Lessonitz Mausoleum by Friedrich Maximilian Hessemer at Frankfurt Main Cemetery

Augusta died on 19 February 1841. William and Emilie married morganatically on 8 July 1841 at Bzenec Castle in Moravia. Their witness was State Chancellor Prince Klemens von Metternich.

Emilie died on 12 February 1843 in Frankfurt am Main to a liver infection and was buried at the Frankfurt Main Cemetery in Frankfurt. The Elector commissioned the architect Friedrich Maximilian Hessemer, to create a mausoleum in the Byzantine style. The crucifix inside was created by the sculptor Johann Nepomuk Zwerger. The marble sarcophagus was commissioned by the Countess's children and created in 1863 by the sculptor Eduard Schmidt von der Launitz. Elector Frederick William, who had succeeded his father by then, tried every diplomatic means available to prevent his father's sculpture from being installed in the mausoleum, but achieved nothing in the Free City of Frankfurt. Today, the tomb with a capstone from 1847, contains six coffins.

After Emilie's death, William married a third time, with Caroline von Berlepsch (1820–1877), whom he created Countess of Bergen. He died on 20 November 1847 and was buried in the countly crypt of the St. Mary's Church in Hanau.

== Issue ==
Emilie and William had eight children:

- Louise (born: 26 February 1813 in Berlin; died: 3 October 1883 in Baden-Baden), married on 15 May 1845 with Imperial Secret Councillor Count Charles August von Bose (born: 7 November 1814 in Garmisch; died: 25 December 1887 in Baden-Baden). Louise von Bose was an important patron of the arts.
- Julius William (born: 4 October 1815 in Kassel; died: 15 January 1822 in Kassel).
- Amalia Wilhelmine Emilie (born: 31 December 1816 in Kassel; died: 28 July 1858 in Dresden).
  1. married in 1836 Count William von Luckner (born: 29 January 1805; died: 19 February 1865); divorced 1839
  2. married in 1840 Baron Charles von Watzdorff (born: 9 March 1807 in Dresden; died: 5 December 1846 Dresden)
  3. married Count William von Luckner again in 1847
- Charles (born: 24 August 1818 in Kassel; died: 26 September 1881 in Prague)
  1. married on 20 December 1861 with Clementine Richter (born: 28 August 1842 in Prague; died: 13 July 1902 in Bad Ischl)
- Emilie (born: 8 June 1820 in Kassel; died: 30 January 1891 in Budapest)
  1. married on 10 March 1839 with Count Felix Zichy-Ferraris of Zich and Vásonkeö (born: 20 November 1810; died: 8 September 1885 in Szilvás, Hungary)
- Friederike (born: 16 December 1821 in Kassel, died 23 February 1898 in Weilburg)
  1. married on 3 November 1841 with Baron William von Dungern (born: 20 June 1809 in Weilburg; died: 3 July 1874 in Bad Wildbad)
- William (born: 29 June 1824 in Kassel; died: 19 January 1866 in Neuchâtel)
  1. married on 19 March 1857 Amélie Göler von Ravensburg (born: 27 April 1838 in Karlsruhe; died: 14 March 1912 in Frankfurt)
- Helene (born: 8 August 1825 at Schloss Wilhelmshöhe Castle; died: 14 May 1898 in Munich)
  1. married on 4 January 1844 with Baron Oswald von Fabrice (born: 8 January 1820 in Bonn; died: 3 June 1898 in Munich)
