= Ferdinand Maximilian II of Isenburg-Wächtersbach =

Ferdinand Maximilian II
- Count of Ysenburg-Büdingen-Wächtersbach
- Reign: 14 March 1703 – 21 April 1755
- Predecessor: Ferdinand Maximilian I, Count of Ysenburg-Büdingen-Wächtersbach
- Successor: Ferdinand Casimir I, Count of Ysenburg-Büdingen-Wächtersbach
- Born: 12 January 1692; Wächtersbach
- Died: 22 April 1755 (aged 63); Wächtersbach
- Spouse: Countess Albertine Ernestine of Isenburg-Büdingen (m. 1713) Countess Ernestine Wilhelmine of Stolberg-Gedern (m. 1725)
- Issue: Ferdinand Casimir I Albert August; William Reinhard; Adolph I Louis Maximilian I
- House: Isenburg
- Father: Ferdinand Maximilian I, Count of Ysenburg-Büdingen-Wächtersbach
- Mother: Countess Albertine Marie of Sayn-Wittgenstein-Berleburg

Ferdinand Maximilian II of Isenburg-Wächtersbach was a German count of Isenburg-Wächtersbach from 1703 to 1755. The county itself lasted from 1673 to 1806 in the central Holy Roman Empire, until it was mediated to Isenberg.

== Ancestry ==
Ancestors of Ferdinand Maximilian II of Isenburg-Wächtersbach

8. Wolfgang Ernst I, Count of Isenburg-Büdingen-Birstein
4. Johann Ernst I, Count of Isenburg-Büdingen
9. Countess Juliane of Sayn-Wittgenstein
2. Ferdinand Maximilian I, Count of Isenburg-Wächtersbach
10. George Albert I, Count of Erbach-Schönberg
5. Countesd Maria Charlotte of Erbach-Erbach
11. Countess Magdalene of Nassau-Dillenburg
1. Ferdinand Maximilian II, Count of Isenburg-Wächtersbach
12. Count Louis Casimir of Sayn-Wittgenstein-Berleburg
6. Count Georg Wilhelm of Sayn-Wittgenstein-Berleburg
13. Countess Elisabeth of Nassau-Weilburg
3. Countess Albertine Maria of Sayn-Wittgenstein-Berleburg
14. François de La Place Vicomte de Machaut
7. Amelie Marguerite de La Place
15. Anna Margareta van Brederode
