= Ferdinand Maximilian I of Isenburg-Wächtersbach =

Ferdinand Maximilian I
- Count of Ysenburg-Büdingen-Wächtersbach
- Reign: 1673 – 14 Mar 1703
- Predecessor: Johann Ernst I, Count of Isenburg-Büdingen
- Successor: Ferdinand Maximilian II, Count of Ysenburg-Büdingen-Wächtersbach
- Born: 3 January 1662; Büdingen
- Died: 14 March 1703 (aged 41); Wächtersbach
- Spouse: Countess Albertine Maria of Sayn-Wittgenstein-Berleburg (m. 1685)
- Issue: Ferdinand Maximilian II, Count of Ysenburg-Büdingen-Wächtersbach
- House: Isenburg
- Father: Johann Ernst I, Count of Isenburg-Büdingen
- Mother: Countesd Maria Charlotte of Erbach-Erbach

Ferdinand Maximilian I of Isenburg-Wächtersbach was a German count of Isenburg-Wächtersbach from 1673 to 1703, and was the first of that county, (which was located near the center of the Holy Roman Empire), and the father of Ferdinand Maximilian II of Isenburg-Wächtersbach. The county lasted from 1673 to 1806, until it was mediated to Isenburg.

== Ancestry ==
Ancestors of Ferdinand Maximilian I of Isenburg-Wächtersbach

8. Philipp II, Count of Isenburg-Büdingen in Birstein
4. Wolfgang Ernst I, Count of Isenburg-Büdingen-Birstein
9. Countess Irmengard of Solms-Braunfels
2. Johann Ernst I, Count of Isenburg-Büdingen
10. Louis I, Count of Sayn-Wittgenstein
5. Countess Juliane of Sayn-Wittgenstein
11. Countess Elisabeth of Solms-Laubach
1. Ferdinand Maximilian I, Count of Isenburg-Wächtersbach
12. George III, Count of Erbach-Breuberg
6. George Albert I, Count of Erbach-Schönberg
13. Countess Maria of Barby-Mühlingen
3. Countesd Maria Charlotte of Erbach-Erbach
14. Johann VI, Count of Nassau-Dillenburg
7. Countess Magdalene of Nassau-Dillenburg
15. Countess Johannetta of Sayn-Wittgenstein
