= William II, Elector of Hesse =

Elector of Hesse from 1821 to 1847

William II
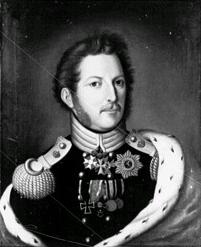

Elector of Hesse
- Reign: 27 February 1821 – 20 November 1847
- Predecessor: William I
- Successor: Frederick William
- Born: 28 July 1777; Schloss Philippsruhe, Hesse-Kassel
- Died: 20 November 1847 (aged 70); Frankfurt, Hesse
- Spouse: Princess Augusta of Prussia (m. 1797; died 1841) Emilie Ortlöpp (m. 1841; died 1843) Caroline of Berlepsch (m. 1843)
- Issue Detail: Prince Wilhelm; Princess Karoline; Princess Luise; Frederick William, Elector of Hesse; Marie Frederica, Duchess of Saxe-Meiningen; Prince Ferdinand; Luise Wilhelmine Emilie; Julius Wilhelm Albrecht; Gustav Karl; Amalie Wilhelmine Emilie; Emilie; Friederike; Wilhelm; Helene
- House: Hesse-Kassel
- Father: William I, Elector of Hesse
- Mother: Wilhelmina Caroline of Denmark

William II (German: Wilhelm II.; 28 July 1777 – 20 November 1847) was the penultimate Elector of Hesse.

== Early life ==
William was the eldest surviving son of William I, Elector of Hesse and Wilhelmina Caroline of Denmark and Norway. With the Hessian troops, he was involved in the War of the Sixth Coalition against Napoleon in 1813. He succeeded as Elector of Hesse (a title that was moribund after the dissolution of the Holy Roman Empire in 1806) after his father's death in 1821.

Upon succeeding his father as Elector, he halted the construction of the Chattenburg palace. Instead, he focused on expanding the Residenzpalais in Kassel.

== Personal life ==
On 13 February 1797 in Berlin, William married Princess Augusta of Prussia, fourth daughter of King Frederick William II of Prussia. They had six children:

- Wilhelm (9 April 1798 – 25 October 1800), who died in infancy.
- Karoline (29 July 1799 – 28 November 1854)
- Luise (3 April 1801 – 28 September 1803), who died in infancy.
- Friedrich (20 August 1802 – 6 June 1875), later Elector of Hesse.
- Marie Fredericka (6 September 1804 – 4 January 1888), who married Bernhard II, Duke of Saxe-Meiningen
- Ferdinand (9 October 1806 – 21 November 1806), who died in infancy.

=== Second marriage ===
William also had eight children with his second wife, Emilie Ortlöpp, daughter of Johann Christian Ortlöpp and Agnese Wiessenberg, created in 1821 Countess of Reichenbach-Lessonitz. The children bore the title Count/Countess of Reichenbach-Lessonitz:

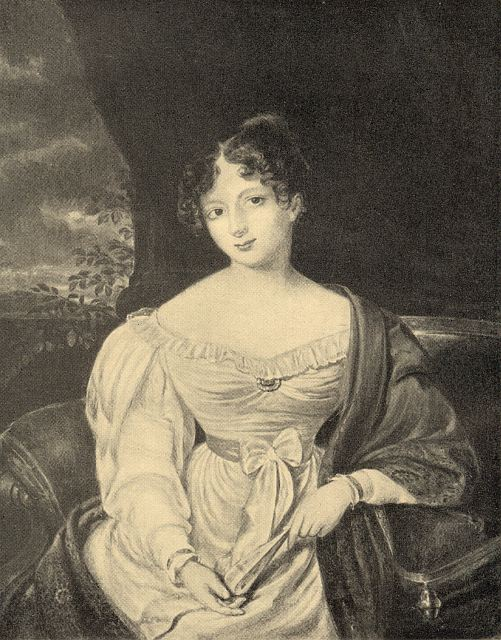
Emilie Ortlöpp, Countess of Reichenbach-Lessonitz

Coin of William II, Elector of Hesse, struck 1823
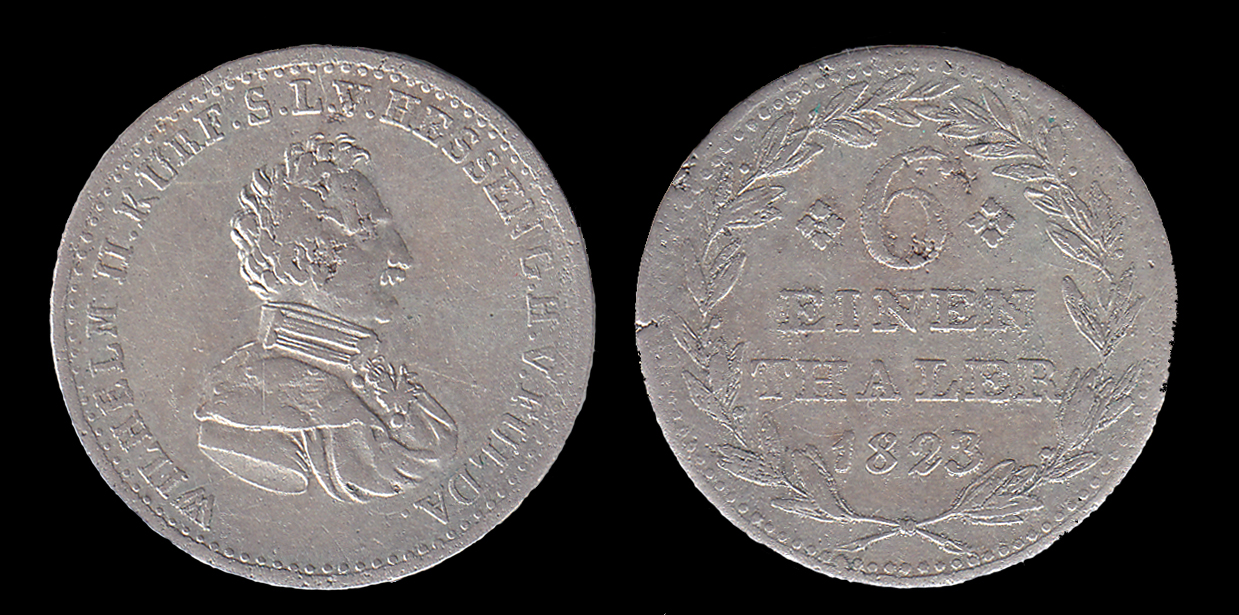
First side of the image: Obverse: (German) WILHELM II, KURF S.L.V. HESSEN G.H.V. FULDA, "Wilhelm II, Kurfurst und Sovereigner Landgrave von Hessen, Gross Herzog von Fulda" in English: "William II, Elector and Sovereign Landgrave of Hesse, Grand Duke of Fulda".
Second side of the image: Reverse: (German) EINEN THALER, in English: "One Thaler".
- Luise Wilhelmine Emilie (26 February 1813 – 3 October 1883), who married Karl Count von Bose.
- Julius Wilhelm Albrecht (4 October 1815 – 15 January 1822).
- Amalie Wilhelmine Emilie (31 December 1816 – 28 July 1858), who married Wilhelm Count von Lückner, then Karl Baron von Watzdorf.
- Gustav Karl (24 August 1818 – 26 September 1861), who married Clementine Richter.
- Emilie (8 June 1820 – 30 January 1891), who married Felix Count Zichy-Ferraris.
- Friederike (16 December 1821 – 23 February 1898), who married Wilhelm Baron von Dungern.
- Wilhelm (29 June 1824 – 19 January 1866), who married Helene Amelie Baroness Goeler von Ravensburg (ancestors of Ameli, Duchess of Oldenburg, Count Luitpold of Castell-Castell, and Richard, 6th Prince of Sayn-Wittgenstein-Berleburg (the last of whom through his father, Gustav Albrecht, 5th Prince of Sayn-Wittgenstein-Berleburg).
- Helene (8 August 1825 – 14 May 1898), who married Oswald Baron von Fabrice (4x great-grandparents of Tatiana Blatnik).

=== Third marriage ===
Several months after Augusta's death on 19 February 1841, William morganatically married his mistress and their children were legitimated. Emilie Ortlöpp died less than two years after the marriage in 1843.

Again, months after his second wife's death, William married (morganatically) Caroline, Baroness of Berlepsch (1820–1877), daughter of Ludwig Hermann, Baron of Berlepsch and Melusine Jul. Chr. von Kruse. William created the title of Countess of Bergen for Caroline in 1846. This marriage was childless. After his death, she married on 28 October 1851 Karl Adolf Graf von Hohenthal (1811–1875), by whom she had two sons: Karl Adolf (b. 1853) and Karl Ludwig (b. 1857).

William died on 20 November 1847 and was succeeded by his eldest surviving son, Frederick William, the last Elector of Hesse.

=== Descendants ===
Princess Tatiana of Greece and Denmark, the former wife of Prince Nikolaos of Greece and Denmark, is a descendant of William II through her mother's side.

== Honours ==
- Electorate of Hesse:
  - Knight of the House Order of the Golden Lion, 11 May 1783; Grand Cross, 29 May 1785
  - Knight of the Pour la Vertu Militaire, 29 May 1785
  - Knight of the Order of the Iron Helmet, 22 September 1814
- Grand Duchy of Hesse: Grand Cross of the Ludwig Order
- Kingdom of Prussia:
  - Knight of the Order of the Black Eagle, 26 November 1794
  - Knight of the Order of the Red Eagle, 1st Class, 26 November 1794
- Kingdom of Hanover: Grand Cross of the Royal Guelphic Order, 1818
- Denmark: Knight of the Order of the Elephant, 16 April 1821
- Austrian Empire: Grand Cross of the Order of St. Stephen, 1821
- (Saxe-Coburg and Gotha) (Duchy of Saxe-Altenburg) (Saxe-Meiningen) Ernestine duchies: Grand Cross of the Saxe-Ernestine House Order, April 1834

== Ancestry ==
Ancestors of William II, Elector of Hesse

8. William VIII, Landgrave of Hesse-Kassel
4. Frederick II, Landgrave of Hesse-Kassel
9. Princess Dorothea Wilhelmine of Saxe-Zeitz
2. William I, Elector of Hesse
10. George II of Great Britain
5. Princess Mary of Great Britain
11. Princess Caroline of Brandenburg-Ansbach
1. William II, Elector of Hesse
12. Christian VI of Denmark
6. Frederick V of Denmark
13. Princess Sophie Magdalene of Brandenburg-Kulmbach
3. Princess Wilhelmina Caroline of Denmark
14. George II of Great Britain (= 10)
7. Princess Louise of Great Britain
15. Princess Caroline of Brandenburg-Ansbach (= 11)

== Sources ==
- Marek, Miroslav. "Genealogy of the Hesse-Kassel line". Genealogy.EU.

William II, Elector of Hesse House of Hesse-Kassel Born: 28 July 1777 Died: 20 November 1847
Regnal titles
Preceded by William I	Elector of Hesse; 1821–1847	Succeeded by Frederick William
