= Princess Augusta of Prussia =

German salonist, painter and consort (1780–1841)

Augusta of Prussia
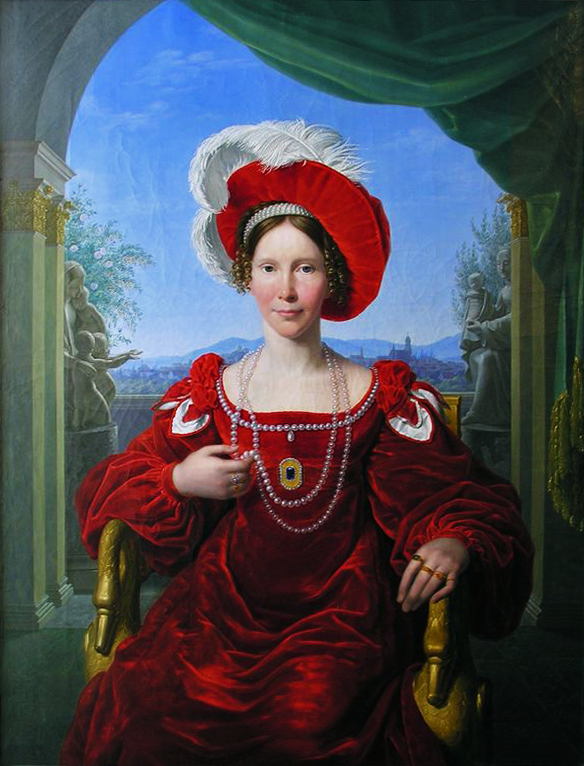
- Portrait by Friedrich Bury

Electress consort of Hesse
- Tenure: 27 February 1821 – 19 February 1841
- Born: 1 May 1780; Potsdam, Prussia
- Died: 19 February 1841 (aged 60); Kassel
- Spouse: William II, Elector of Hesse (m. 1797)
- Issue: Prince Wilhelm; Princess Karoline; Princess Luise; Frederick William, Elector of Hesse; Marie, Duchess of Saxe-Meiningen; Prince Ferdinand
Names
- Auguste Christine Friederike
- House: Hohenzollern
- Father: Frederick William II of Prussia
- Mother: Frederika Louisa of Hesse-Darmstadt

Augusta of Prussia (Christine Friederike Auguste; 1 May 1780 – 19 February 1841) was a German salonist, painter, and Electress consort of Hesse by marriage to William II, Elector of Hesse. She was the third daughter and fifth child of Frederick William II of Prussia and Frederika Louisa of Hesse-Darmstadt.

== Biography ==
On 13 February 1797 in Berlin, Augusta married Prince William of Hesse-Kassel, eldest surviving son of William IX, Landgrave of Hesse-Kassel. In 1803, the Landgrave was raised to Elector of Hesse, and Prince William succeeded on his father's death in 1821.

The marriage of Augusta was politically arranged and unhappy. Augusta and William often came into conflict with one another, which led to aggressive confrontations.

In 1806, Hesse was occupied by France. Augusta was in Berlin with her children at the time, having remained in the Prussian capital due to her pregnancy when Napoleon's army took it for France. Napoleon put guards around her house and gave orders that she should not be disturbed. With Hesse and Prussia occupied and her family in exile, Augusta lacked money, and after her child's birth she asked for a meeting with Napoleon. She appeared before him with her newborn baby on her arm and one of her children by the hand and asked him for an allowance, which he granted her.

After the birth of her last child in 1806, the relationship between Augusta and William was unofficially terminated. In 1815, they agreed to keep separate households. Augusta lived in Schoenfeld Palace, where she became a celebrated salonist and the centre of the romantic Schoenfelder-circle, which included Ludwig Hassenpflug, Joseph von Radowitz and the Grimm brothers, while William lived in a different residence with his mistress, Emilie Ortlöpp.

Auguste closed her salon in 1823, and between 1826 and 1831 she lived in The Hague, Koblenz, Bonn and Fulda. She returned to Kassel in 1831. Augusta was regarded as a skillful painter, whose works included self-portraits.

Several months after Augusta's death, William morganatically remarried his longtime mistress Emilie Ortlöpp, ennobled as Countess von Reichenbach-Lessonitz, by whom he had an additional eight children.

== Issue ==
1. Wilhelm (9 April 1798 – 25 October 1800)
2. Karoline (29 July 1799 – 28 November 1854)
3. Luise (3 April 1801 – 28 September 1803)
4. Frederick William, Elector of Hesse (20 August 1802 – 6 June 1875) morganatically married Gertrude Lehmann.
5. Marie (6 September 1804 – 4 January 1888), married Bernhard II, Duke of Saxe-Meiningen and had issue.
6. Ferdinand (9 October 1806 – 21 November 1806)

== Ancestry ==
Ancestors of Princess Augusta of Prussia

16. Frederick I of Prussia
8. Frederick William I of Prussia
17. Sophia Charlotte of Hanover
4. Prince Augustus William of Prussia
18. George I of Great Britain
9. Princess Sophia Dorothea of Hanover
19. Sophia Dorothea of Celle
2. Frederick William II of Prussia
20. Ferdinand Albert I
10. Ferdinand Albert II, Duke of Brunswick-Wolfenbüttel
21. Christine of Hesse-Eschwege
5. Duchess Luise of Brunswick-Wolfenbüttel
22. Louis Rudolph, Duke of Brunswick
11. Duchess Antoinette of Brunswick-Wolfenbüttel
23. Christine Louise of Oettingen-Oettingen
1. Princess Augusta of Prussia
24. Ernest Louis, Landgrave of Hesse-Darmstadt
12. Louis VIII, Landgrave of Hesse-Darmstadt
25. Dorothea Charlotte of Brandenburg-Ansbach
6. Louis IX, Landgrave of Hesse-Darmstadt
26. Johann Reinhard III, Count of Hanau-Lichtenberg
13. Countess Charlotte of Hanau-Lichtenberg
27. Dorothea Friederike of Brandenburg-Ansbach
3. Princess Frederica Louisa of Hesse-Darmstadt
28. Christian II, Count Palatine of Zweibrücken-Birkenfeld
14. Christian III, Count Palatine of Zweibrücken
29. Katharina Agathe, Countess of Rappoltstein
7. Countess Palatine Caroline of Zweibrücken
30. Louis Crato, Count of Nassau-Saarbrücken
15. Countess Caroline of Nassau-Saarbrücken
31. Philippine Henriette of Hohenlohe

== Notes ==
Princess Augusta of Prussia House of Hohenzollern Cadet branch of the Burchardinger dynasty Born: 1 May 1780 Died: 19 February 1841
German royalty
Vacant Title last held by Wilhelmina Caroline of Denmark	Electress of Hesse; 27 February 1821 – 19 February 1841	Electorate annexed to Prussia in 1866
