= Frederick William, Elector of Hesse =

Elector of Hesse from 1847 to 1866

Frederick William
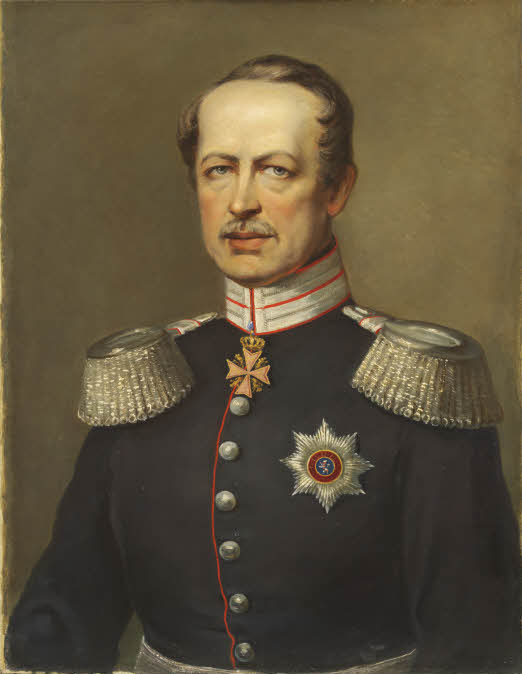
- Portrait c. 1840–1850

Elector of Hesse
- Reign: 1847–1866
- Predecessor: William II
- Successor: Electorate abolished
- Born: 20 August 1802; Hanau, Holy Roman Empire
- Died: 6 January 1875 (aged 72); Prague, Austria-Hungary
- Spouse: Gertrude Falkenstein, Princess of Hanau (m. 1831)
- Issue Detail: Princess Augusta of Hanau and Hořowitz; Princess Alexandrine of Hanau and Hořowitz; Prince Friedrich Wilhelm of Hanau and Hořowitz; Prince Moritz of Hanau and Hořowitz; Prince Wilhelm of Hanau and Hořowitz; Princess Maria of Hanau and Hořowitz; Prince Karl of Hanau and Hořowitz; Prince Heinrich of Hanau and Hořowitz; Prince Philipp of Hanau and Hořowitz
- House: House of Hesse
- Father: William II
- Mother: Princess Augusta of Prussia

Frederick William I (20 August 1802 – 6 January 1875) was, between 1847 and 1866, the last Prince-elector of Hesse-Kassel (or Hesse-Cassel).

== Early life ==
He was born at Hanau on 20 August 1802. He was the son of Prince William, later William II, Elector of Hesse, and Princess Augusta of Prussia, daughter of King Frederick William II of Prussia. During the French occupation of Hesse-Kassel from 1806 to 1813, he stayed with his mother in Berlin. Reportedly, he had a poor relationship with his father because of his father's affair with Emilie Ortlöpp.

Frederick was educated at Marburg and Leipzig.

== Career ==
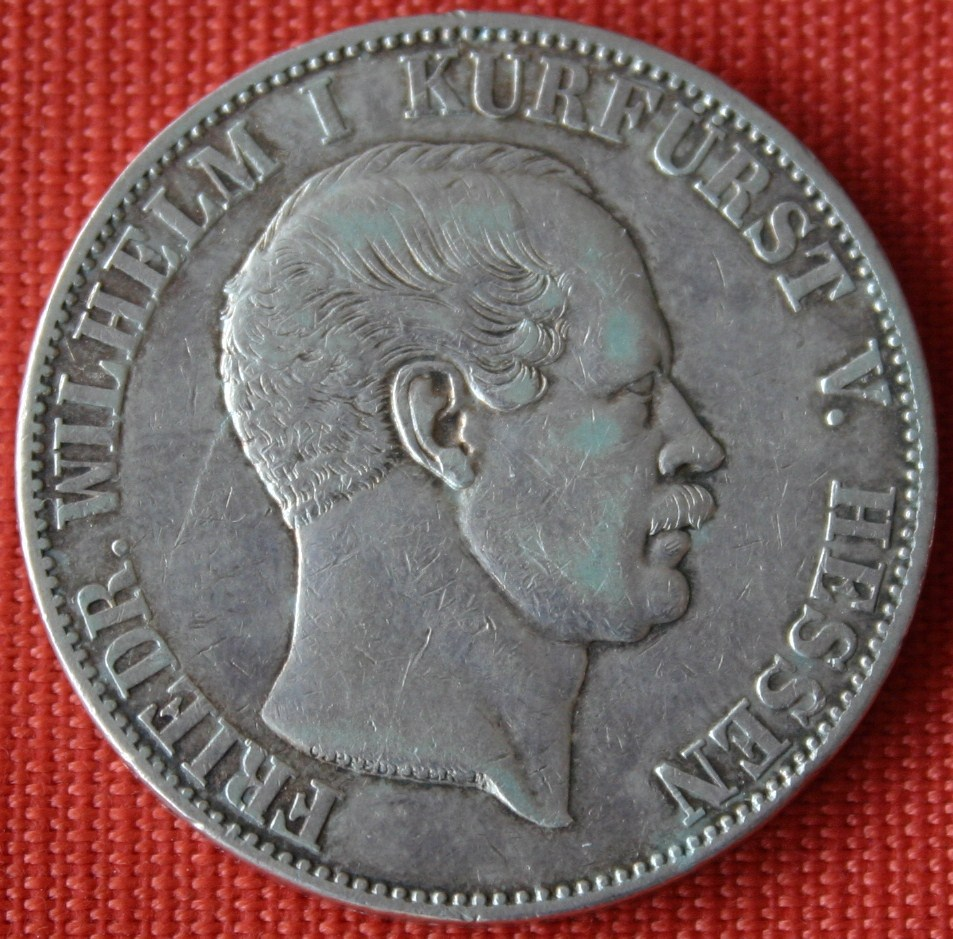
Coin of Frederick William

On 30 September 1831, he became co-regent and, in 1847, Prince-elector. Under influence of his minister Hans Daniel Ludwig Friedrich Hassenpflug, he conducted a reactionary policy, which made him very unpopular. He was forced to give in to the demands of the March Revolution, but reinstated Hassenpflug in 1850 after the revolution had been crushed.

In the Austro-Prussian War of 1866, he chose the side of Austria. His capital, Kassel, was occupied by Prussia, and, as a consequence of his refusal to negotiate, he was transferred as a prisoner to Stettin on 23 June. Hessen-Kassel was annexed by Prussia in the same year.

Frederick William never accepted the Prussian dominance over his territory. Even after the creation of the unified German Empire in 1871, he tried to regain his throne.

== Personal life ==
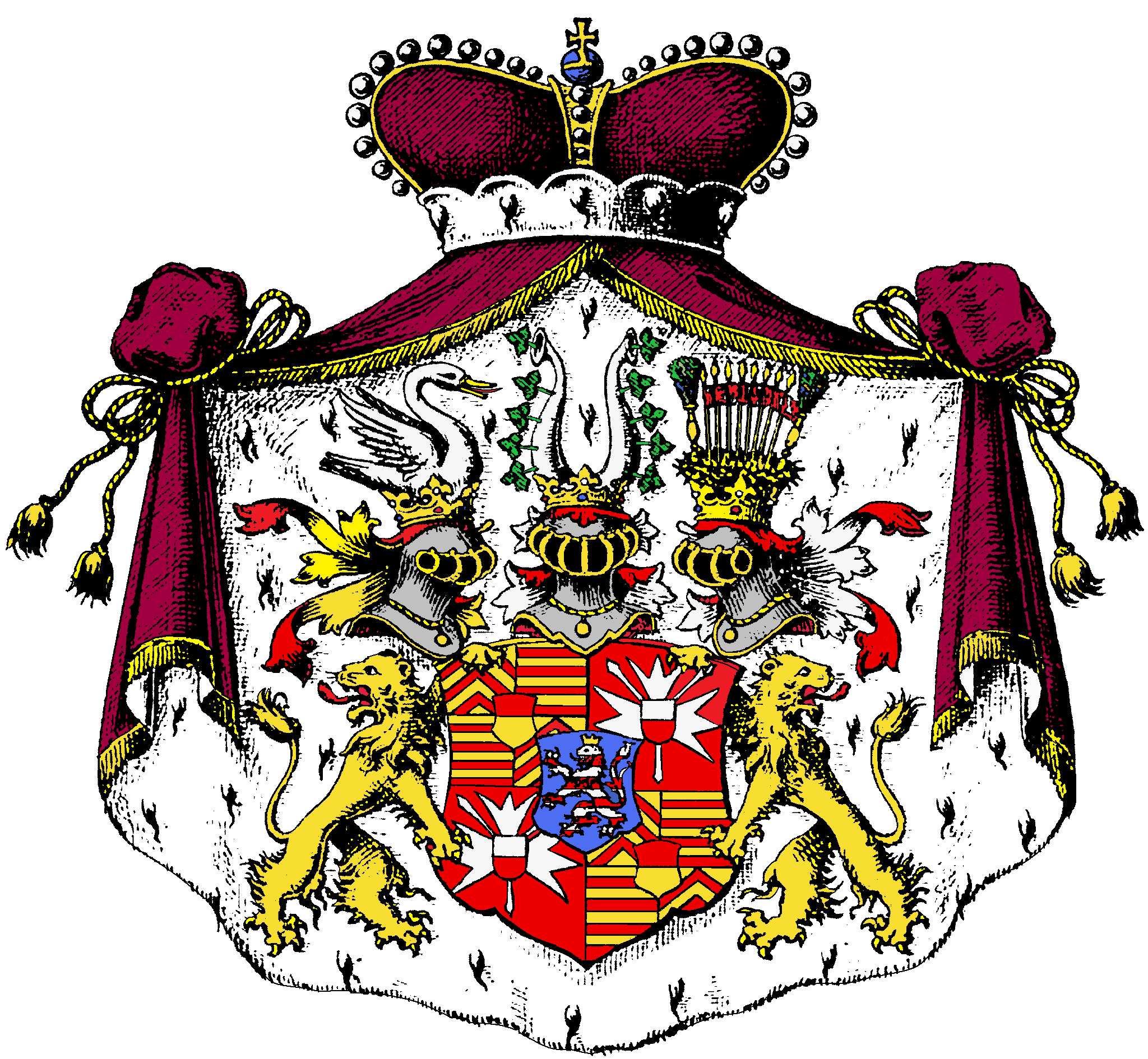
Coat of arms of the House of Hanau-Schaumburg, Frederick William's morganatic descendants.

On 26 June 1831, Frederick William was morganatically married to Gertrude Falkenstein Lehmann. She had been born in Bonn and was the daughter of apothecary Johann Gottfried Falkenstein and Magdalena Schulz. When Frederick William met Gertrude, she was the wife of Lt Karl Michael Lehmann (married in 1822) and the mother of two sons. Gertrude and her husband were divorced in 1830/31, but already by this time, some children had been born to her and Frederick William. They were married in 1831, after which they had further children.

In 1831, Frederick William's father William II made Gertrude Her Illustrious Highness Countess of Schaumburg. In 1853, she was made Princess of Hanau and to Horowitz. All of the nine children that she bore to Frederick William, whether born before or after their marriage, were made Princes of Hanau, and granted the style of Serene Highness in 1862:

- Augusta Marie Gertrude (Niederdorfelden, 21 September 1829 - Halle an der Saale, 18 September 1887; bur Wächtersbach), who married Ferdinand Maximilian III, Prince of Isenburg-Büdingen in Wächtersbach (Wächtersbach, 24 October 1824 - Wächtersbach, 5 June 1903) in Wilhelmshohe on 17 July 1849. Augusta and Ferdinand Maximilian were the maternal grandparents of Prince Hermann and Princess Sophie of Saxe-Weimar-Eisenach.
- Alexandrine Friederike Wilhelmine (Fulda, 22 December 1830 - Lindau, 20 December 1871; bur Kassel), who married Prince Felix Eugen Wilhelm Ludwig Albrecht Karl zu Hohenlohe-Oehringen (Oehringen, 1 March 1818 - Asnières, 8 September 1900), youngest son of August, Prince of Hohenlohe-Öhringen, in Kassel on 12 June 1851.
- Friedrich Wilhelm (Schloss Wilhelmshöhe, 18 November 1832 - Horowitz, 14 May 1889), who married, morganatically, twice, Auguste Birnbaum (Kassel, 9 November 1837 - Cannstatt, 29 June 1862), daughter of Karl Birnbaum and Maria Sargany, in London on 23 September 1856 and divorced, and Ludowika Gloede (Hamburg, 6 May 1840 - Munich, 20 April 1912), daughter of Reverend Friedrich Gloede and Maria Dorothea Goldbeck, in Vienna on 8 April 1875; their children were Counts von Schaumburg, but post-1918 descendants bear the title Prince and Princess von Hanau; the head of this line was Prince of Hanau, but the eldest son, Friedrich Wilhelm, and his issue were bypassed until all other sons and their issue male had died.
- Moritz Philipp Heinrich, 1st Prince of Hanau and Horowitz, Count of Schaumburg (Schloss Wilhelmshöhe, 4 May 1834 - Horowitz, 30 March 1889), who married, morganatically, Anne von Lossberg (Kassel, 14 August 1829 - Horowitz, 27 October 1876), daughter of Karl Wilhelm Jeremias von Lossberg and Marianne von Wangenheim, in Freiburg on 15 April 1875; they had no children.
- Wilhelm, 2nd Prince of Hanau and Horowitz, Count of Schaumburg (Kassel, 19 December 1836 - Horowitz, 3 June 1902), who married Princess Elisabeth Wilhelmine Auguste Marie of Schaumburg-Lippe (Bückeburg, 5 March 1841 - Wiesbaden, 30 November 1926), daughter of George William, Prince of Schaumburg-Lippe, in Frankfurt on 30 January 1866; they divorced in 1868 and he married Countess Elisabeth of Lippe-Weissenfeld (Dresden, 1 July 1868 - Schweinfurt, 24 October 1952) in Doberitz on 12 May 1890; neither marriage produced children.
- Marie Auguste (Schloss Wilhelmshöhe, 22 August 1839 - Bonn, 26 March 1917), who married Prince Wilhelm Friedrich Ernst of Hesse-Philippsthal-Barchfeld (Burgsteinfurt, 3 October 1831 - Rotenburg an der Fulda, 17 January 1890) in Kassel on 27 December 1857. They divorced in 1872, and Marie and her children were granted the titles HSH Prince/ss of Ardeck after her divorce on 28 July 1876.
- Karl, 3rd Prince of Hanau and Horowitz, Count of Schaumburg (Kassel, 29 November 1840 - Kassel, 27 January 1905), who married Countess Hermine Grote (Hannover, 8 October 1859 - Münchhagen, 31 March 1939) in Hannover on 11 November 1882; they did not have children.
- Friedrich Wilhelm Heinrich Ludwig, 4th Prince of Hanau and Horowitz, Count of Schaumburg (Kassel, 8 December 1842 - Prague, 15 July 1917), who married, morganatically, Martha Riegel (Bischofsburg, East Prussia, 26 October 1876 - Prague, 10 March 1943), in Prague on 5 June 1917.
- Friedrich Wilhelm Philipp (Kassel, 29 December 1844 - Oberurf, 28 August 1914), who married, morganatically, Albertine Hubatschek-Stauber (Semlin, 7 December 1840 [7 December 1845, per 1893 GGT] - Gratsch, near Meran, 11 April 1912) in Vienna on 29 March 1875; their children bore the title Counts of Schaumburg.

He died at Prague on 6 January 1875, where his widow also died on 9 July 1882. Because of his morganatic marriage, his sons were excluded from succession. He was succeeded, as titular Prince-elector of Hesse, by Prince Frederick William of Hesse from the house of Hesse-Rumpenheim.

=== Honours ===
- Grand Cross of the House Order of the Golden Lion
- 18 June 1821: Knight of the Order of the Black Eagle
- 1837: Grand Cross of the Order of St. Stephen
- April 1844: Knight of the Order of St. Andrew the First-called
- 15 February 1846: Grand Cordon of the Order of Leopold
- 29 January 1848: Knight of the Order of the Elephant
- 13 August 1865: Grand Cross of the House Order of the Wendish Crown

== Ancestry ==
Ancestors of Frederick William, Elector of Hesse

8. Frederick II, Landgrave of Hesse-Kassel
4. William I, Elector of Hesse
9. Princess Mary of Great Britain
2. William II, Elector of Hesse
10. Frederick V of Denmark
5. Princess Wilhelmina Caroline of Denmark
11. Louise of Great Britain
1. Frederick William, Elector of Hesse
12. Prince Augustus William of Prussia
6. Frederick William II of Prussia
13. Louise Amalie of Brunswick-Lüneburg
3. Princess Augusta of Prussia
14. Louis IX, Landgrave of Hesse-Darmstadt
7. Frederika Louisa of Hesse-Darmstadt
15. Countess Palatine Caroline of Zweibrücken

== Notes and references ==
Frederick William, Elector of Hesse House of Hesse-Kassel Cadet branch of the House of Hesse Born: 20 August 1802 Died: 6 January 1875
Regnal titles
Preceded by William II	Elector of Hesse; 1847–1866	Monarchy abolished Electorate annexed by Prussia
Political offices
Preceded by William II as Elector of Hesse	Head of State of Hesse-Kassel; 1847–1866	Succeeded by William I of Prussia as German Emperor
Titles in pretence
Loss of title Electorate annexed to Prussia	— TITULAR — Elector of Hesse; 1866–1875	Succeeded by Frederick William II
