= Duke William of Württemberg =

Austrian Army General

His Royal Highness Duke William of Württemberg
- Wilhelm Herzog von Württemberg
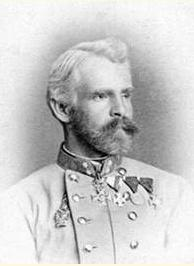
- Duke William, c.1878

2nd Governor of Bosnia and Herzegovina
- In office 18 November 1878 – 6 April 1881
- Appointed by: Franz Joseph I of Austria
- Preceded by: Josip Filipović
- Succeeded by: Hermann, Freiherr Dahlen von Orlaburg

Personal details
- Born: 20 July 1828 Carlsruhe, Kingdom of Prussia
- Died: 5 November 1896 (aged 68) Merano, Tyrol, Austria-Hungary
- Profession: Soldier
- Awards: Order of the Crown Military Merit Order Imperial Order of Leopold Order of the Iron Crown Pour le Mérite

Military service
- Allegiance: Austrian Empire (until 1867) Austria-Hungary (1867-1891)
- Branch/service: Austro-Hungarian Army
- Years of service: 1848-1891
- Rank: Lieutenant Colonel General
- Unit: 1st Infantry Regiment Northern Army
- Commands: 27th Infantry Regiment 11th Infantry Division
- Battles/wars: First Italian War of Independence; Second Italian War of Independence; Battle of Magenta; Austro-Prussian War; Battle of Königgrätz; Franco-Prussian War; Russo-Turkish War

Duke William of Württemberg (German: Wilhelm Nikolaus Herzog von Württemberg; 20 July 1828 – 5 November 1896) was an Austrian and Württemberg General.

== Early life and family ==
Duke William was born at Carlsruhe, Kingdom of Prussia (now Pokój, Poland) was the first child of Duke Eugen of Württemberg (1788–1857, son of Duke Eugen of Württemberg and Princess Louise of Stolberg-Gedern) by his second marriage to Princess Helene of Hohenlohe-Langenburg (1807–1880, daughter of Charles Louis, Prince of Hohenlohe-Langenburg and Countess Amalie Henriette of Solms-Baruth). William had three half-siblings from his father's previous marriage with Princess Mathilde of Waldeck and Pyrmont. He was the first member of the House of Württemberg to attend a public high school in Breslau.

== Military career ==
=== War service ===
After studying in Geneva and Bonn, he joined the Austrian Army in 1848 as a lieutenant for Infantry Regiment Kaiser Franz Joseph No. 1 in Vienna. During the First Italian War of Independence (1848–1849) he was wounded several times. In recognition of his bravery, Field Marshal Joseph Radetzky von Radetz promoted him to captain in the infantry regiment No. 45.

In 1853 he became major, between 1857 and 1859 colonel lieutenant, and colonel and commander of the infantry regiment No. 27 King of the Belgians. He fought also at the Second Italian War of Independence (1859). At the Battle of Magenta, he impressed both his superiors, Major General Wilhelm Ramming and Field Marshal Lieutenant Eduard Clam-Gallas and his opponents. The French generals Gustave Lannes de Montebello and Pierre Louis Charles de Failly mentioned this a few weeks later in a meeting against the Field Marshal Lieutenant Prince of Hesse.

In 1866 he took part in the Austro-Prussian War as a major general, his brigade was assigned to the Northern Army and fought in the Battles of Königgrätz, Swiepwalde, Blumenau and Bratislava.

After the campaign, he arrived with his brigade in Trieste, in 1869 he was made commander of 11th Infantry Division troops in Prague and on 24 October 1869 he was promoted to lieutenant field marshal. During the Franco-Prussian War William fought on the German side against France. He also fought in the Russian-Turkish war in 1878.

=== Bosnia and Herzegovina ===
In 1878, during the Austro-Hungarian occupation of Bosnia and Herzegovina, he fought (again on the Austrian side) at Rogelj and Jajce. Due to his excellent performances, Emperor Franz Joseph I appointed him Feldzeugmeister and commanding general of the 18th Army Corps. His task was to submit to the west and bring peace to Bosnia. In 1878 he was commissioned to organize the newly established Condominium of Bosnia and Herzegovina militarily and politically. He served as Governor of Bosnia and Herzegovina from 1878 to 1881.

He developed the military and economic interests to be taken into account plan, a large number of communication routes. The school system, especially the militarily organized Knabenpensionat in Sarajevo, developed in a short time, as well as all other branches of administration and justice.

=== Later years ===
In 1883 William was the commanding general of the XI. Corps in Lemberg. In 1889 he became commander of the 3rd Armeekorps in Graz. In 1891 he retired from the military because of the death of King Charles I of Württemberg. As the late king's successor William II had no son, William became the heir presumptive to the throne of Württemberg.

William was Württemberg General of the Infantry à la suite of the Grenadier Regiment "King Karl" (5 Wurttemberg) No. 123 and the Royal Colonel of the Prussian Infantry Regiment of Herwarth Bittenfeld (1st Westphalian) No. 13.

As a member of the House of Württemberg, he was a member of the Estates of Württemberg.

== Death ==
William died unmarried and without issue. The consequences of war injuries and a car accident in Italy affected his health. He died during a vacation in Tyrol.

== Honours and awards ==
- Württemberg:
  - Grand Cross of the Württemberg Crown, 1842
  - Grand Cross of the Friedrich Order
  - Knight of the Military Merit Order, 17 April 1849; Commander, 3 August 1859; Grand Cross, 18 December 1878
  - Golden Jubilee Medal
- Brunswick: Grand Cross of the Order of Henry the Lion, 1860
- Kingdom of Prussia:
  - Pour le Mérite (military), 22 March 1864
  - Grand Cross of the Red Eagle, 28 September 1876
  - Knight of Honour of the Johanniter Order, 27 July 1884; Knight of Justice, 1890
- (Saxe-Coburg and Gotha) (Duchy of Saxe-Altenburg) (Saxe-Meiningen) Ernestine duchies: Grand Cross of the Saxe-Ernestine House Order, 1860
- Kingdom of Bavaria: Knight of St. Hubert, 1892
- Belgium: Commander of the Order of Leopold (military), 14 December 1859; Grand Cordon, 1881
- Baden:
  - Knight of the House Order of Fidelity, 1893
  - Knight of the Order of Berthold the First, 1893
- (Principality of Schaumburg-Lippe) Lippe:
  - Cross of Honour of the House Order of Lippe, 1st Class with Swords
  - Military Merit Medal
- Mecklenburg-Schwerin: Military Merit Cross, 1st Class
- Principality of Montenegro: Grand Cross of the Order of Prince Danilo I
- Ottoman Empire: Order of Osmanieh, 1st Class
- Russian Empire: Knight of St. Alexander Nevsky
- (Kingdom of the Two Sicilies) Two Sicilian Royal Family: Grand Cross of the Order of Francis I
- Austrian Empire:
  - Knight of the Imperial Order of Leopold, 1849; Commander, 1864; Grand Cross with War Decoration, 1881
  - Knight of the Iron Crown, 2nd Class, 1859; 1st Class with War Decoration, 1878
  - Knight of the Military Order of Maria Theresa, 1859
  - Grand Cross of the Royal Hungarian Order of St. Stephen, 1891
  - Military Merit Cross
  - Long Service Cross for Officers, 2nd Class (50 years)

== Ancestry ==
Ancestors of Duke William of Württemberg

8. Frederick II Eugene, Duke of Württemberg
4. Duke Eugen of Württemberg
9. Princess Friederike of Brandenburg-Schwedt
2. Duke Eugen of Württemberg
10. Christian Carl, Prince of Stolberg-Gedern
5. Princess Louise of Stolberg-Gedern
11. Countess Eleonore Reuss of Lobenstein
1. Duke William of Württemberg
12. Christian Albrecht, Prince of Hohenlohe-Langenburg
6. Karl Ludwig, Prince of Hohenlohe-Langenburg
13. Princess Caroline of Stolberg-Gedern
3. Princess Helene of Hohenlohe-Langenburg
14. Johann Christian II, Count of Solms-Baruth
7. Countess Amalie Henriette of Solms-Baruth
15. Countess Friederike Reuss of Köstritz

== Literature ==
- The Royal House of Stuart, London, 1969, 1971, 1976, Addington, A. C., Reference: 223
- L'Allemagne dynastique, Huberty, Giraud, Magdelaine, Reference: II 525
- R. Zerelik in: Sönke Lorenz, Dieter Mertens, Volker Press (Eds.): The House of Wuerttemberg. A biographical dictionary. Kohlhammer Verlag, Stuttgart 1997, ISBN 3-17-013605-4, S. 370–371.
- Frank Raberg: Manual of the Württemberg State Parliament from 1815 to 1933. Biographical Kohlhammer Verlag, Stuttgart 2001, ISBN 3-17-016604-2, p. 1051st
- Franz Ilwof: Nicolaus Wilhelm, Duke of Württemberg. In General German Biography (ADB). Band 43, Duncker & Humblot, Leipzig 1898, S. 213–218. Volume 43, Duncker & Humblot, Leipzig 1898, p. 213-218.
- Constantin von Wurzbach: Württemberg, Wilhelm Nicolaus Duke of, In: Biographical Encyclopedia of the Empire Austria, Volume 58 (1889), published by LC Zamarski, Vienna, 1856–1891, p. 253-258

Duke William of Württemberg House of Württemberg Born: 20 July 1828 Died: 5 November 1896
Political offices
Preceded by Josip Filipović	Governor of Bosnia and Herzegovina; 18 November 1878 – 5 April 1881	Succeeded by Hermann Dahlen
