= Duchess Agnes of Württemberg =

- Princess Reuss Younger Line
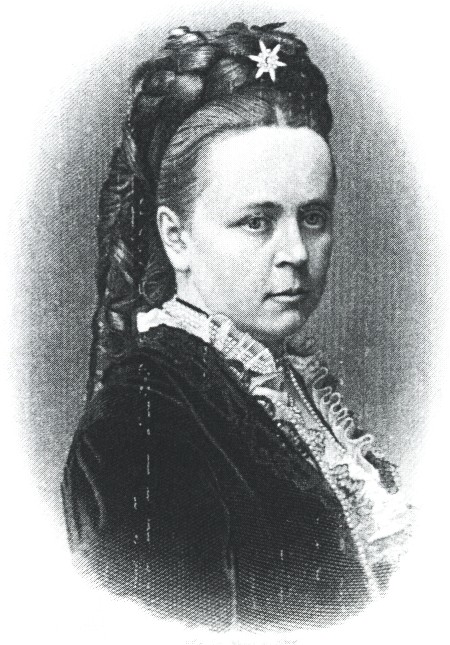
- Agnes on a steel engraving by August Weger
- Born: 13 October 1835; Carlsruhe, Kingdom of Prussia
- Died: 10 July 1886 (aged 50); Gera, Reuss Younger Line
- Spouse: Heinrich XIV, Prince Reuss Younger Line (m. 1858)
- Issue: Heinrich XXVII, Prince Reuss Younger Line; Elisabet, Princess Hermann of Solms-Braunfels
Names
- German: Pauline Louise Agnes
- House: House of Württemberg (by birth); House of Reuss Younger Line (by marriage)
- Father: Duke Eugen of Württemberg
- Mother: Princess Helene of Hohenlohe-Langenburg

Duchess Agnes of Württemberg (German: Herzogin Pauline Louise Agnes von Württemberg; 13 October 1835 – 10 July 1886) was a German aristocrat and writer under the pseudonym of Angela Hohenstein.

== Life and family ==
Duchess Agnes was born at Carlsruhe, Kingdom of Prussia (now Pokój, Poland) was the youngest child of Duke Eugen of Württemberg (1788–1857), (son of Duke Eugen of Württemberg, and Princess Louise of Stolberg-Gedern (1764-1834)) by his second marriage to Princess Helene of Hohenlohe-Langenburg, (daughter of Karl Ludwig, Prince of Hohenlohe-Langenburg and Countess Amalie Henriette of Solms-Baruth). Agnes had three half-siblings by her father's previous marriage with Princess Mathilde of Waldeck and Pyrmont.

Agnes founded numerous foundations and institutions that bore her name, such as the Agnes School, a school for female servants in Gera.

== Marriage and issue ==
Agnes married on 6 February 1858 at Karlsruhe to Heinrich XIV, Prince Reuss Younger Line (1832–1913), son of Heinrich LXVII, Prince Reuss Younger Line and Princess Adelheid of Reuss-Ebersdorf.

They had two children:

- Heinrich XXVII, Prince Reuss Younger Line (10 November 1858 – 21 November 1928), married in 1884 to Princess Elise of Hohenlohe-Langenburg, had issue.
- Princess Elisabeth Reuss of Schleiz (27 October 1859 – 23 February 1951), married in 1887 to Prince Hermann of Solms-Braunfels, had issue.

== Works ==
- Helene (narrative, 1867)
- From a lovely time. Eight images (incl.: Fra Angelico Giovanni da Fiesole, Roswitha, From Venice, a fantasy forest, three folk songs in a picture, In the back room, the lilies of the cemetery Meran, Johann Arnold's diary, 1878)
- The blessing of the Grandmother (Family picture in two volumes, 1880)

== Ancestry ==
Ancestors of Duchess Agnes of Württemberg

8. Frederick II Eugene, Duke of Württemberg
4. Duke Eugen of Württemberg
9. Margravine Sophia Dorothea of Brandenburg-Schwedt
2. Duke Eugen of Württemberg
10. Christian Karl, Prince of Stolberg-Gedern
5. Princess Louise of Stolberg-Gedern
11. Countess Eleanore Reuss of Lobenstein
1. Duchess Agnes of Württemberg
12. Christian Albert, Prince of Hohenlohe-Langenburg
6. Charles Louis, Prince of Hohenlohe-Langenburg
13. Countess Caroline of Stolberg-Gedern
3. Princess Helene of Hohenlohe-Langenburg
14. Johann Christian II, Count of Solms-Baruth
7. Countess Amalie of Solms-Baruth
15. Countess Friederike Reuss of Köstritz

== Notes and sources ==
- The Royal House of Stuart, London, 1969, 1971, 1976, Addington, A. C., Reference: II 223
- Genealogisches Handbuch des Adels, Fürstliche Häuser, Reference: 1956
- L'Allemagne dynastique, Huberty, Giraud, Magdelaine, Reference: II 525

Duchess Agnes of Württemberg House of Württemberg Born: 13 October 1835 Died: 10 July 1886
German royalty
Preceded by Adelheid Reuss of Ebersdorf	Princess consort Reuss Younger Line; 11 July 1867 – 10 July 1886	Vacant Title next held by Elise of Hohenlohe-Langenburg
