= Duke Eugen of Württemberg (1820–1875) =

German prince

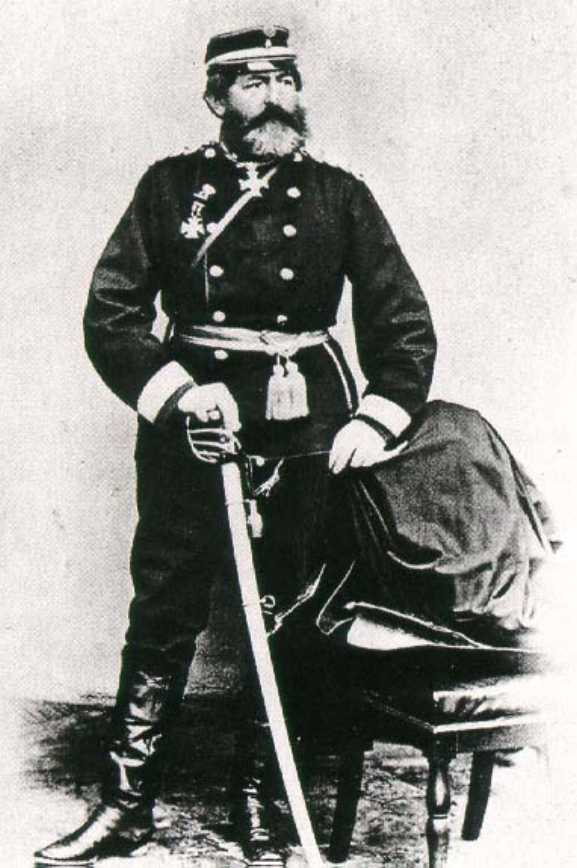
- Born: 25 December 1820; Carlsruhe, currently Pokój, Opole Voivodeship, Kingdom of Prussia
- Died: 8 January 1875 (aged 54); Karlsruhe, Grand Duchy of Baden, German Empire
- Spouse: Princess Mathilde of Schaumburg-Lippe (m. 1843)
- Issue: Duchess Wilhelmine; Duke Eugen; Pauline, Baroness of Kirbach
Names
- German: Eugen Wilhelm Alexander Erdmann
- House: Württemberg
- Father: Duke Eugen of Württemberg
- Mother: Princess Mathilde of Waldeck and Pyrmont

Duke Eugen of Württemberg (German: Herzog Eugen Wilhelm Alexander Erdmann von Württemberg; 25 December 1820 – 8 January 1875) was a German prince.

== Early life and family ==
Duke Eugen was born at Carlsruhe, currently Pokój, Opole Voivodeship, Kingdom of Prussia, second child and first son of Duke Eugen of Württemberg, (son of Duke Eugen of Württemberg, and Princess Louise of Stolberg-Gedern) and his wife, Princess Mathilde of Waldeck and Pyrmont (daughter of George I, Prince of Waldeck and Pyrmont and Princess Augusta of Schwarzburg-Sondershausen).

== Military career ==
Eugen was Commander of the 1st Westphalian Hussars No. 8.

== Death ==
Eugen died aged 54. At the time of his death he was second in the line to the throne of Württemberg after Prince William (later King William II).

== Marriage and issue ==
On 15 July 1843, in Bückeburg, he married Princess Mathilde of Schaumburg-Lippe (1818–1891), daughter of George William, Prince of Schaumburg-Lippe and Princess Ida of Waldeck and Pyrmont. They had three children:

- Duchess Wilhelmine of Württemberg (11 July 1844 – 24 April 1892), married in 1868, Duke Nicholas of Württemberg, no issue.
- Duke Eugen of Württemberg (20 August 1846 – 27 January 1877) married in 1874 to Grand Duchess Vera Constantinovna of Russia, had issue.
- Duchess Pauline of Württemberg (11 April 1854 – 23 April 1914) married in 1880 to Dr. Melchor Hans Ottokar Willim, had issue.

== Honours ==
- Order of the Crown (Württemberg)

== Ancestry ==
Ancestors of Duke Eugen of Württemberg (1820–1875)

8. Frederick II Eugene, Duke of Württemberg
4. Duke Eugen of Württemberg
9. Margravine Sophia Dorothea of Brandenburg-Schwedt
2. Duke Eugen of Württemberg
10. Christian Karl, Prince of Stolberg-Gedern
5. Princess Louise of Stolberg-Gedern
11. Countess Eleanore Reuss of Lobenstein
1. Duke Eugen of Württemberg
12. Karl August, Prince of Waldeck and Pyrmont
6. George I, Prince of Waldeck and Pyrmont
13. Countess Palatine Christiane Henriette of Zweibrücken-Birkenfeld
3. Princess Mathilde of Waldeck and Pyrmont
14. August II, Prince of Schwarzburg-Sondershausen
7. Princess Augusta of Schwarzburg-Sondershausen
15. Princess Christina of Anhalt-Bernburg

== Notes and sources ==
- The Royal House of Stuart, London, 1969, 1971, 1976, Addington, A. C., Reference: page 222
- L'Allemagne dynastique, Huberty, Giraud, Magdelaine, Reference: vol II page 525.
