= Marie of Württemberg (1818–1888) =

German princess

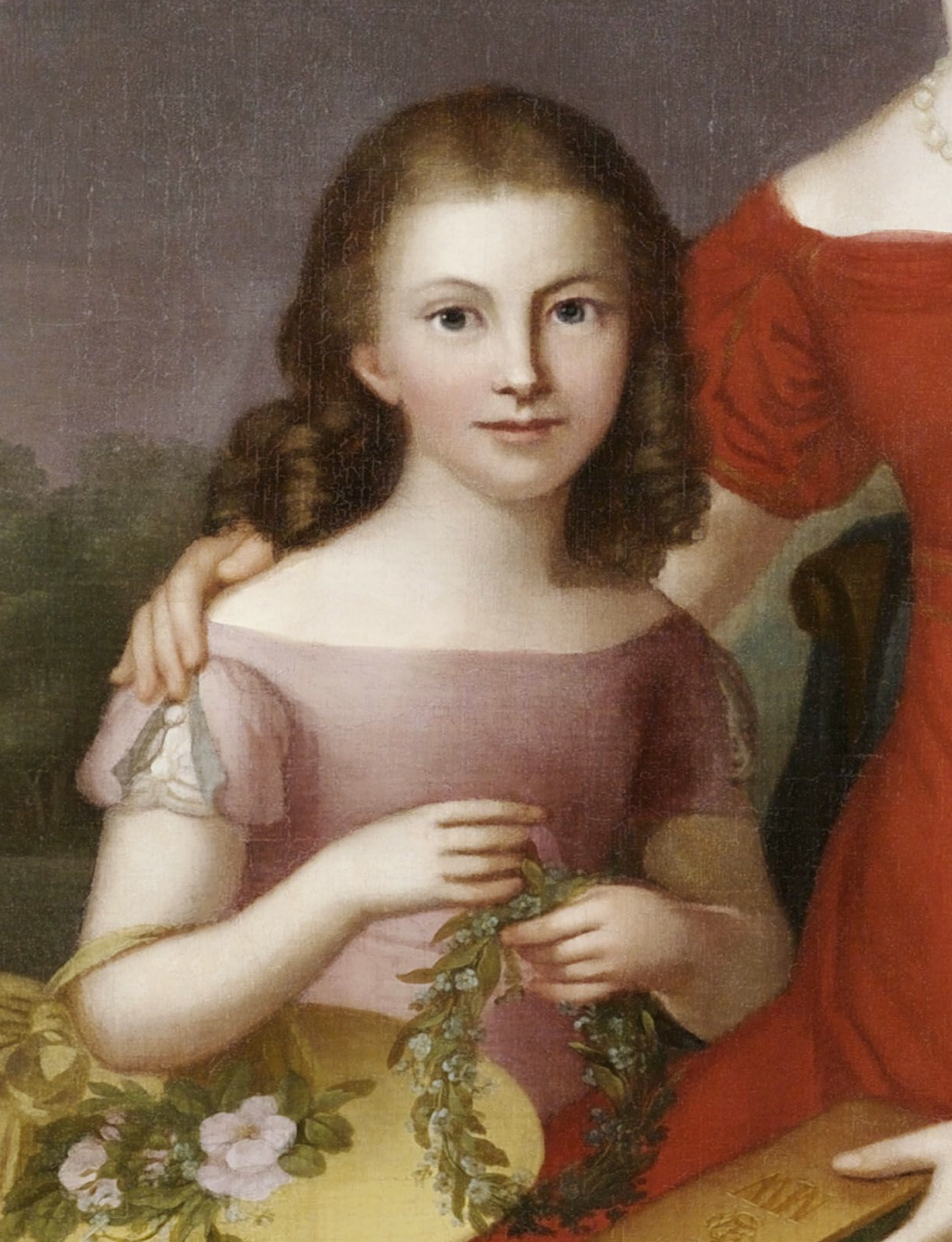
Detail of Marie of Württemberg as a child in a family portrait by Carl Rothe

Marie of Württemberg (1818-1888) was daughter of the Duke of Württemberg and Landgravine of Hesse-Philippsthal in her own right.

== Life ==
Marie was born in Bad Carlsruhe (current-day Pokój, Poland) the daughter of Duke Eugen of Württemberg and Princess Mathilde of Waldeck and Pyrmont.

She married the Landgrave Karl of Hesse-Philippsthal (1803-1868) on the 9th of October, 1845. They had two children, Ernst (1846–1925) and Karl Alexander (1853–1916).

In the beginning of the 1880s, Marie founded the "Vaterländischen Frauenverein" or Women's Association of the Fatherland in Philippsthal, a group focused on nursing and social assistance.

She died at the Schloss Philippsthal and is buried in the Philippsthal cemetery.
