= Duke Nicholas of Württemberg =

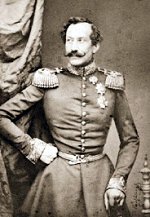
- Born: 1 March 1833; Carlsruhe, Kingdom of Prussia
- Died: 22 February 1903 (aged 69); Bad Carlsruhe, Kingdom of Prussia
- Spouse: Duchess Wilhelmine of Württemberg (m. 1868)
Names
- German: Nikolaus
- House: House of Württemberg
- Father: Duke Eugen of Württemberg
- Mother: Princess Helene of Hohenlohe-Langenburg

Duke Nicholas of Württemberg (German: Herzog Nikolaus von Württemberg; 1 March 1833 – 22 February 1903) was an officer in the army of the Austrian Empire.

== Biography ==
=== Early life and family ===
Duke Nicholas was born at Carlsruhe, Kingdom of Prussia (now Pokój, Poland) was the third child of Duke Eugen of Württemberg (1788–1857, son of Duke Eugen of Württemberg and Princess Louise of Stolberg-Gedern) by his second marriage to Princess Helene of Hohenlohe-Langenburg (1807–1880, daughter of Charles Louis, Prince of Hohenlohe-Langenburg and Countess Amalie of Solms-Baruth). Nicholas had three half-siblings by his father's previous marriage with Princess Mathilde of Waldeck and Pyrmont.

=== Military career ===
After attending high school in Breslau and studied at Leibniz University Hannover. He was initially in the Austrian navy, and later in the Austrian Army. In 1860 he reached the rank of Major, in 1864 he participated in the Second Schleswig War and in 1866 at the Austro-Prussian War.

Then he traveled to Spain and North Africa. Since 1877, he was a Major General and Brigadier General in Kraków, in 1882 he stationed as a lieutenant and division commander in Komarno.

=== Marriage ===
On 8 May 1868, in Carlsruhe, he married his half-niece Duchess Wilhelmine of Württemberg (1844–1892), she was the eldest daughter of his older half-brother Duke Eugen of Württemberg and his wife Princess Mathilde of Schaumburg-Lippe. They had no issue.

=== Later life ===
Since 1888, Duke Nicholas lived in Carlsruhe (now Karlsruhe), where he operated as agriculture and forestry, and carried out studies on the fishing industry. As a member of the House of Württemberg in 1855 he had a seat in the Estates of Württemberg.

Nicholas died on 22 February 1903. At his death the third branch of the House of Württemberg (Carlsruhe) became extinct in the male line. His funeral took place on 27 February 1903. According to his will, Carlsruhe was passed to King William II, which he had from 1903 to his death in 1921, annually the King spent several weeks in hunting vacation at Carlsruhe. After The King's death Carlsruhe and the headship of the House of Württemberg went to Duke Albrecht (1865–1939).

== Honours and awards ==
- Württemberg:
  - Grand Cross of the Order of the Württemberg Crown, 1847
  - Grand Cross of the Friedrich Order
  - Jubilee Medal
- (Austrian Empire) (Kingdom of Hungary) Austria-Hungary:
  - Grand Cross of the Royal Hungarian Order of Saint Stephen, 1896
  - Military Jubilee Medal
  - Service Award for Officers (50 years)
- Kingdom of Bavaria: Knight of the Order of Saint Hubert, 1896
- Principality of Lippe: Cross of Honour of the House Order of Lippe, 1st Class with Swords
- Kingdom of Prussia:
  - Knight of Honour of the Johanniter Order, 1890; Knight of Justice, 1892
  - Knight of the Order of the Black Eagle, 18 January 1900
- Kingdom of Saxony: Knight of the Order of the Rue Crown, 1899

== Ancestry ==
Ancestors of Duke Nicholas of Württemberg

8. Frederick II Eugene, Duke of Württemberg
4. Duke Eugen of Württemberg
9. Margravine Sophia Dorothea of Brandenburg-Schwedt
2. Duke Eugen of Württemberg
10. Christian Karl, Prince of Stolberg-Gedern
5. Princess Louise of Stolberg-Gedern
11. Countess Eleanore Reuss of Lobenstein
1. Duke Nicholas of Württemberg
12.Christian Albert, Prince of Hohenlohe-Langenburg
6. Charles Louis, Prince of Hohenlohe-Langenburg
13. Countess Caroline of Stolberg-Gedern
3. Princess Helene of Hohenlohe-Langenburg
14. Johann Christian II, Count of Solms-Baruth
7. Countess Amalie of Solms-Baruth
15. Countess Friederike Reuss of Köstritz

== Notes and sources ==
- The Royal House of Stuart, London, 1969, 1971, 1976, Addington, A. C., Reference: 223
- L'Allemagne dynastique, Huberty, Giraud, Magdelaine, Reference: II 525
