= Order of the Crown (Württemberg) =

Württembergian order of chivalry

Royal Order of the Crown
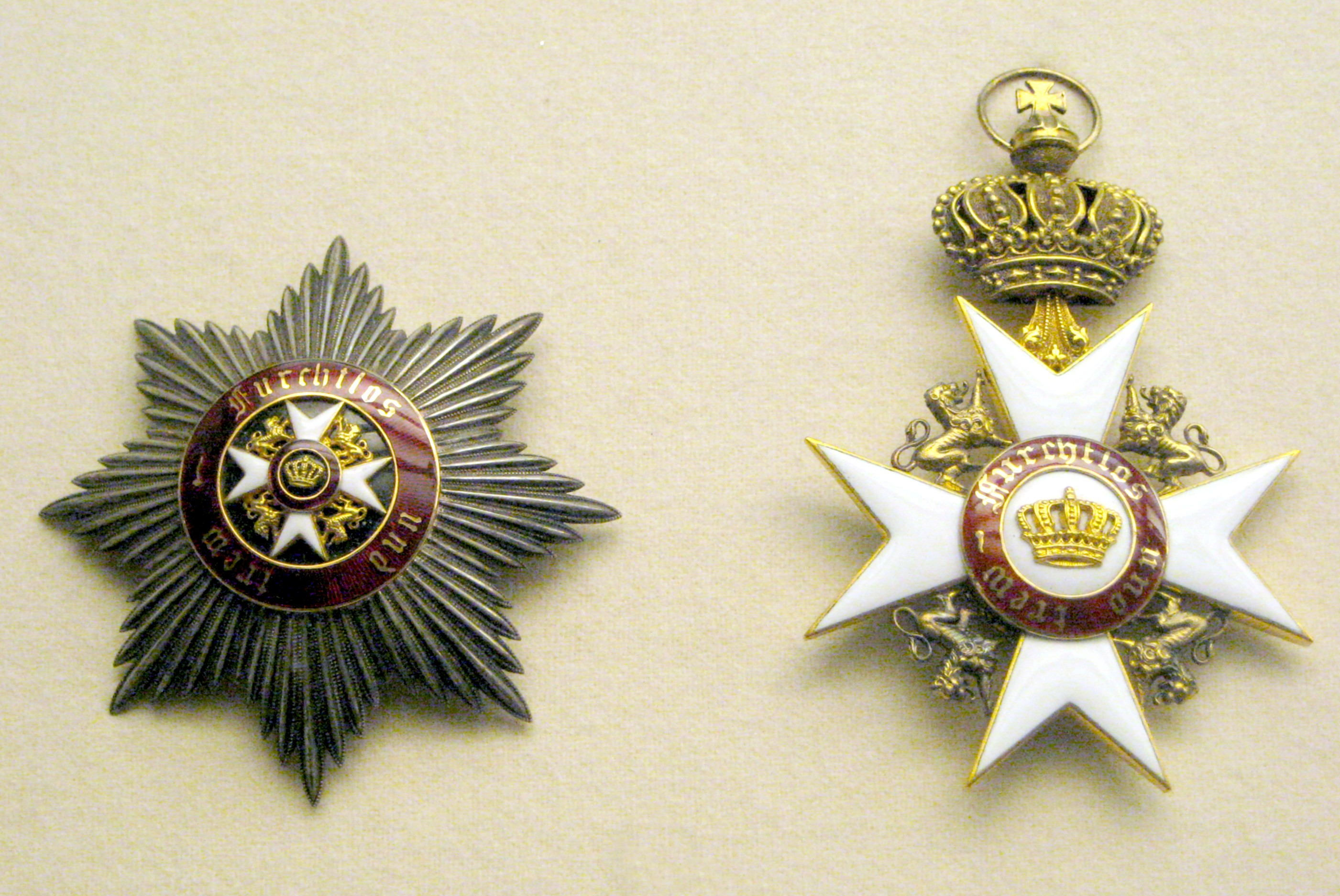
- The Star and Badge of the Order

Awarded by The Head of the House of Württemberg
- Type: Dynastic Order
- Royal house: House of Württemberg
- Ribbon: Pale blue with gold edges bearing a narrow red stripe
- Motto: Furchtlos und Treu ("Fearless and True")
- Awarded for: Conspicuous and special merit
- Status: active
- Sovereign: Duke Wilhelm
- Grades: Knight Grand Cross, Special Class
- Former grades: Knight Grand Cross; Knight Commander; Commander; Cross of Honour; Knight; Gold service medal Silver service medal

Precedence
- Next (higher): None (highest)
- Next (lower): Royal Decoration of Olga
- Sovereign, Grand Master and Grand Crosses, Special Class All other grades of the Order.

Commander's Cross

Grand Cross

The Order of the Württemberg Crown (Orden der Württembergischen Krone) was an order of chivalry in Württemberg.

== History ==
First established in 1702 as the St.-Hubertus-Jagdorden (Hunting Order of St Hubert), in 1807 it was renamed the Ritterorden vom Goldenen Adler (Knightly Order of the Golden Eagle) by Frederick I, and on 23 September 1818 renewed and restructured (at the same time as the civil orders) by William I as the Order of the Württemberg Crown with (initially) 3 classes (grand cross, commander, knight). In 1889 and 1892, the order was expanded and changed.

Its motto reads 'Furchtlos und treu ('fearless and loyal'). Until 1913 the higher orders were restricted to the nobility. In descending order, its ranks were:

1. Knight Grand Cross, Special Class (for sovereigns);
2. Knight Grand Cross;
3. Knight Commander (since 1889);
4. Commander;
5. Cross of Honour (Ehrenkreuz; since 1892);
6. Knight (since 1892 with golden lions, and since 1864 also with a crown, as a special honour);
7. Gold service medal (Verdienstmedaille);
8. Silver service medal (Verdienstmedaille, abolished 1892).

== Insignia ==
=== Cross ===
The order's cross was a white enameled Maltese cross with gold lions in its four angles. The lions came as standard for the grand cross and Komtur, but were only on knight's crosses as a special honour. On the upper arm, a golden crown was secured by means of two gold bands, from which – except in the honour cross in stuck form – the cross hung. The medallion was gold and blue on the front, and in the middle were the golden initials of king Frederick I and a crown – on the back was a golden crown, on red. All grades could since 1866 be awarded with swords. With the changes of 1890, the swords were only granted in awards of a higher class. Since 1892 the lowest grades (1870–1886 knight 2nd class, after that honour-cross) also had the special honours of golden lion and (since 1864) lion added.

=== Stars ===
The grand-cross was a silver 8-pointed star in whose middle was a reduced cross in a medallion with a circular motto in the centre. Sovereigns received the star in gold. The Komtur (since 1889 no longer of the Komtur with star) had a 4-pointed silver star whose rays went through the cross angles.

=== Ribbon ===
The ribbon was carmine red with black stripes and carmine borders. Members of reigning houses received insignia of the grand-cross with a ribbon in scarlet.

== Awards ==
Many awards were made – in the First World War alone, the numbers were:

- Gold Verdienstmedaille: 141
- Knight cross with swords: insgesamt ca. 350
- Knight cross with swords and lions: 80
- Ehrenkreuz with swords: ca. 160
- Komtur with swords: 75
- Komtur with star and swords: 6
- Grand cross with swords: 6

As an extraordinary instance, the grand-cross "in Brillanten" was granted to Reichskanzler Otto von Bismarck in 1871.

Recipients
- Grand Crosses
  - Prince Adalbert of Prussia (1811–1873)
  - Prince Adalbert of Prussia (1884–1948)
  - Duke Adam of Württemberg
  - Adolf I, Prince of Schaumburg-Lippe
  - Duke Adolf Friedrich of Mecklenburg
  - Prince Adolf of Schaumburg-Lippe
  - Adolphe, Grand Duke of Luxembourg
  - Adolphus Frederick V, Grand Duke of Mecklenburg-Strelitz
  - Albert I, Prince of Monaco
  - Prince Albert of Prussia (1809–1872)
  - Albert of Saxony
  - Prince Albert of Saxony (1875–1900)
  - Archduke Albrecht, Duke of Teschen
  - Albert, Prince Consort
  - Prince Albert of Prussia (1837–1906)
  - Albrecht, Duke of Württemberg
  - Alexander II of Russia
  - Alexander III of Russia
  - Alexander Frederick, Landgrave of Hesse
  - Alexander of Battenberg
  - Prince Alexander of Hesse and by Rhine
  - Duke Alexander of Oldenburg
  - Duke Alexander of Württemberg (1771–1833)
  - Duke Alexander of Württemberg (1804–1881)
  - Duke Alexander of Württemberg (1804–1885)
  - Alexander, Prince of Orange
  - Grand Duke Alexei Alexandrovich of Russia
  - Alexis, Prince of Bentheim and Steinfurt
  - Alfonso XIII
  - Alfred, Duke of Saxe-Coburg and Gotha
  - Alfred, 2nd Prince of Montenuovo
  - Prince Arnulf of Bavaria
  - Alexander Cambridge, 1st Earl of Athlone (Prince Alexander of Teck)
  - Prince August of Württemberg
  - August, Prince of Hohenlohe-Öhringen
  - Maximilian de Beauharnais, 3rd Duke of Leuchtenberg
  - Prince Bernhard of Saxe-Weimar-Eisenach (1792–1862)
  - Theobald von Bethmann Hollweg
  - Friedrich Ferdinand von Beust
  - Hans Alexis von Biehler
  - Friedrich Wilhelm von Bismarck
  - Herbert von Bismarck
  - Otto von Bismarck
  - Leonhard Graf von Blumenthal
  - Jérôme Bonaparte
  - Jérôme Napoléon Bonaparte
  - Felix Graf von Bothmer
  - Paul Bronsart von Schellendorff
  - Walther Bronsart von Schellendorff
  - Bernhard von Bülow
  - Count Karl Ferdinand von Buol
  - Adolphus Cambridge, 1st Marquess of Cambridge (Duke of Teck)
  - Leo von Caprivi
  - Carl, Duke of Württemberg
  - Carol I of Romania
  - Jean-Baptiste de Nompère de Champagny
  - Charles I of Württemberg
  - Charles Augustus, Hereditary Grand Duke of Saxe-Weimar-Eisenach (1844–1894)
  - Prince Charles of Prussia
  - Archduke Charles Stephen of Austria
  - Chlodwig, Prince of Hohenlohe-Schillingsfürst
  - Christian IX of Denmark
  - Constantine I of Greece
  - Constantine, Prince of Hohenzollern-Hechingen
  - Duke Constantine Petrovich of Oldenburg
  - Diane, Duchess of Württemberg
  - Grand Duke Dmitry Konstantinovich of Russia
  - Eduard, Duke of Anhalt
  - Edward VII
  - Prince Edward of Saxe-Weimar
  - Prince Eitel Friedrich of Prussia
  - Ernest II, Duke of Saxe-Coburg and Gotha
  - Ernest Louis, Grand Duke of Hesse
  - Ernst I, Prince of Hohenlohe-Langenburg
  - Ernst I, Duke of Saxe-Altenburg
  - Ernst II, Prince of Hohenlohe-Langenburg
  - Ernst Gunther, Duke of Schleswig-Holstein
  - Ernst II, Duke of Saxe-Altenburg
  - Ernst Leopold, 4th Prince of Leiningen
  - Max von Fabeck
  - Géza Fejérváry
  - Ferdinand IV, Grand Duke of Tuscany
  - Archduke Ferdinand Karl of Austria
  - Francis II of the Two Sicilies
  - Francisco de Asís, Duke of Cádiz
  - Frederic von Franquemont
  - Archduke Franz Ferdinand of Austria
  - Franz Joseph I of Austria
  - Archduke Franz Karl of Austria
  - Prince Franz of Bavaria
  - Frederick Augustus II, Grand Duke of Oldenburg
  - Frederick Augustus III of Saxony
  - Frederick Francis II, Grand Duke of Mecklenburg-Schwerin
  - Frederick Francis III, Grand Duke of Mecklenburg-Schwerin
  - Frederick I, Duke of Anhalt
  - Frederick I, Grand Duke of Baden
  - Frederick III, German Emperor
  - Prince Frederick of Württemberg
  - Prince Frederick of the Netherlands
  - Friedrich II, Duke of Anhalt
  - Friedrich Ferdinand, Duke of Schleswig-Holstein
  - Friedrich Hermann Otto, Prince of Hohenzollern-Hechingen
  - Prince Friedrich Leopold of Prussia
  - Archduke Friedrich, Duke of Teschen
  - Charles Egon II, Prince of Fürstenberg
  - Maximilian Egon II, Prince of Fürstenberg
  - Georg II, Duke of Saxe-Meiningen
  - George I of Greece
  - George V of Hanover
  - George V
  - George, King of Saxony
  - George Victor, Prince of Waldeck and Pyrmont
  - Friedrich von Georgi
  - Friedrich von Gerok (officer)
  - Heinrich von Gossler
  - Gustaf V
  - Wilhelm von Hahnke
  - Max von Hausen
  - Samu Hazai
  - Heinrich XXVII, Prince Reuss Younger Line
  - Prince Henry of Prussia (1862–1929)
  - Heinrich VII, Prince Reuss of Köstritz
  - Prince Henry of the Netherlands (1820–1879)
  - Hermann, Prince of Hohenlohe-Langenburg
  - Prince Hermann of Saxe-Weimar-Eisenach (1825–1901)
  - Philip, Landgrave of Hesse-Homburg
  - Paul von Hindenburg
  - Prince Konrad of Hohenlohe-Schillingsfürst
  - Henning von Holtzendorff
  - Dietrich von Hülsen-Haeseler
  - Prince Joachim of Prussia
  - Prince Johann Georg of Saxony
  - John of Saxony
  - Duke John Albert of Mecklenburg
  - Archduke Joseph Karl of Austria
  - Joseph, Duke of Saxe-Altenburg
  - Georg von Kameke
  - Karl Anton, Prince of Hohenzollern
  - Prince Karl of Bavaria (1874–1927)
  - Prince Karl Theodor of Bavaria
  - Karl Theodor, Duke in Bavaria
  - Karl, Prince of Hohenzollern-Sigmaringen
  - Hans von Koester
  - Grand Duke Konstantin Konstantinovich of Russia
  - Grand Duke Konstantin Nikolayevich of Russia
  - Konstantin of Hohenlohe-Schillingsfürst
  - Hermann Kövess von Kövessháza
  - Leopold II of Belgium
  - Archduke Leopold Ferdinand of Austria
  - Prince Leopold, Duke of Albany
  - Prince Leopold of Bavaria
  - Eugen Maximilianovich, 5th Duke of Leuchtenberg
  - George Maximilianovich, 6th Duke of Leuchtenberg
  - Louis III, Grand Duke of Hesse
  - Louis II, Grand Duke of Baden
  - Prince Louis of Battenberg
  - Ludwig I of Bavaria
  - Ludwig III of Bavaria
  - Archduke Ludwig Viktor of Austria
  - Luís I of Portugal
  - Luitpold, Prince Regent of Bavaria
  - Maximilian Karl, 6th Prince of Thurn and Taxis
  - Prince Maximilian of Baden
  - Julius von Mayer
  - Emperor Meiji
  - Grand Duke Michael Nikolaevich of Russia
  - Milan I of Serbia
  - Helmuth von Moltke the Elder
  - Georg Alexander von Müller
  - Napoleon III
  - Duke Nicholas of Württemberg
  - Nicholas I of Russia
  - Nicholas II of Russia
  - Nicholas Alexandrovich, Tsesarevich of Russia
  - Grand Duke Nicholas Nikolaevich of Russia (1831–1891)
  - Grand Duke Nicholas Nikolaevich of Russia (1856–1929)
  - Prince Nikolaus Wilhelm of Nassau
  - Alexey Fyodorovich Orlov
  - Oscar II
  - Archduke Otto of Austria (1865–1906)
  - Prince Paul of Württemberg
  - Duke Paul Wilhelm of Württemberg
  - Peter II, Grand Duke of Oldenburg
  - Duke Peter of Oldenburg
  - Philipp Albrecht, Duke of Württemberg
  - Duke Philipp of Württemberg
  - Prince Philippe, Count of Flanders
  - Hans von Plessen
  - Moritz Karl Ernst von Prittwitz
  - Joseph Radetzky von Radetz
  - Antoni Wilhelm Radziwiłł
  - Archduke Rainer Ferdinand of Austria
  - Duke Robert of Württemberg
  - Albrecht von Roon
  - Prince Rudolf of Liechtenstein
  - Rudolf, Crown Prince of Austria
  - Rupprecht, Crown Prince of Bavaria
  - Prince William of Schaumburg-Lippe
  - Sigismund von Schlichting
  - Alfred von Schlieffen
  - Ludwig von Schröder
  - Grand Duke Sergei Alexandrovich of Russia
  - Archduke Stephen of Austria (Palatine of Hungary)
  - Rudolf Stöger-Steiner von Steinstätten
  - Otto Graf zu Stolberg-Wernigerode
  - Ludwig Freiherr von und zu der Tann-Rathsamhausen
  - Francis, Duke of Teck
  - Alfred von Tirpitz
  - Umberto I of Italy
  - Victor Emmanuel III of Italy
  - Grand Duke Vladimir Alexandrovich of Russia
  - Illarion Vorontsov-Dashkov
  - Alfred von Waldersee
  - Karl von Weizsäcker
  - August von Werder
  - Wilhelm II, German Emperor
  - Wilhelm Karl, Duke of Urach
  - Prince Wilhelm of Prussia (1783–1851)
  - Prince Wilhelm of Saxe-Weimar-Eisenach
  - Wilhelm, Duke of Urach
  - Prince William of Baden
  - William I, German Emperor
  - William II of Württemberg
  - William IV
  - William Ernest, Grand Duke of Saxe-Weimar-Eisenach
  - Duke William Frederick Philip of Württemberg
  - Prince William of Baden (1829–1897)
  - Duke William of Württemberg
  - William, Duke of Brunswick
  - William, Prince of Hohenzollern
  - William, Prince of Wied
  - Duke Eugen of Württemberg (1788–1857)
  - Duke Eugen of Württemberg (1820–1875)
  - Duke Eugen of Württemberg (1846–1877)
  - Duke Ferdinand Frederick Augustus of Württemberg
  - Ferdinand von Zeppelin
- Commanders
  - Erwin Bälz
  - Paul von Bruns
  - Victor von Bruns
  - Adolf von Deines
  - Karl Ludwig d'Elsa
  - Christian Wilhelm von Faber du Faur
  - Maximilian Vogel von Falckenstein
  - Wilhelm von Gümbel
  - Hans Heinrich XV, Prince of Pless
  - Jakob von Hartmann
  - Eberhard von Hofacker
  - Johann Baptist von Keller
  - Carl Friedrich Kielmeyer
  - Wilhelm Frederick von Ludwig
  - Karl von Luz
  - August von Mackensen
  - Curt von Morgen
  - Christian Friedrich von Otto
  - Friedrich von Payer
  - Friedrich August von Quenstedt
  - Rudolf von Roth
  - Gustav Rümelin
  - Hans von Seeckt
  - Gustav von Senden-Bibran
  - Christoph von Sigwart
  - Bertel Thorvaldsen
  - Karl Heinrich Weizsäcker
  - Sir James Wylie, 1st Baronet
- Honour Crosses
  - Hermann Bauer
  - Paul Clemens von Baumgarten
  - Alexander von Brill
  - William G. S. Cadogan
  - Max Eyth
  - Wilhelm Groener
  - Paul Grützner
  - Erich von Gündell
  - Carl Magnus von Hell
  - Adolf Wild von Hohenborn
  - Ewald von Lochow
  - Robert von Ostertag
  - Eduard Pfeiffer
  - Edmund Pfleiderer
  - Hubert von Rebeur-Paschwitz
  - Walther Reinhardt
  - Max von Schillings
  - Kilian von Steiner
  - Hermann Vöchting
  - Oskar von Watter
- Knights
  - Fedor von Bock
  - Theodor Endres
  - Alexander von Falkenhausen
  - Hans von Feldmann
  - Victor Franke
  - Hans von Gronau
  - Eduard von Kallee
  - Fritz von Loßberg
  - Eberhard Graf von Schmettow
  - Otto von Stülpnagel
- Gold Service Medal
- Silver Service Medal
- Unclassified
  - Rudolf von Brudermann
  - Fevzi Çakmak
  - Kurt Eberhard
  - Justus Hecker
  - Otto Keller (philologist)
  - Otto von Moser
  - Christian Wirth
  - Nikola Zhekov

== Bibliography ==
- Jörg Nimmergut, Handbuch Deutsche Orden, Saarbrücken 1989, 315–320
- ders., Deutsche Orden und Ehrenzeichen 1800-1945, Bd. III Sachsen - Württemberg I, München 1999, 1677–1704, ISBN 3-00-001396-2
