= Duke Eugen of Württemberg (1788–1857) =

German prince and a General of Infantry in the Imperial Russian Army

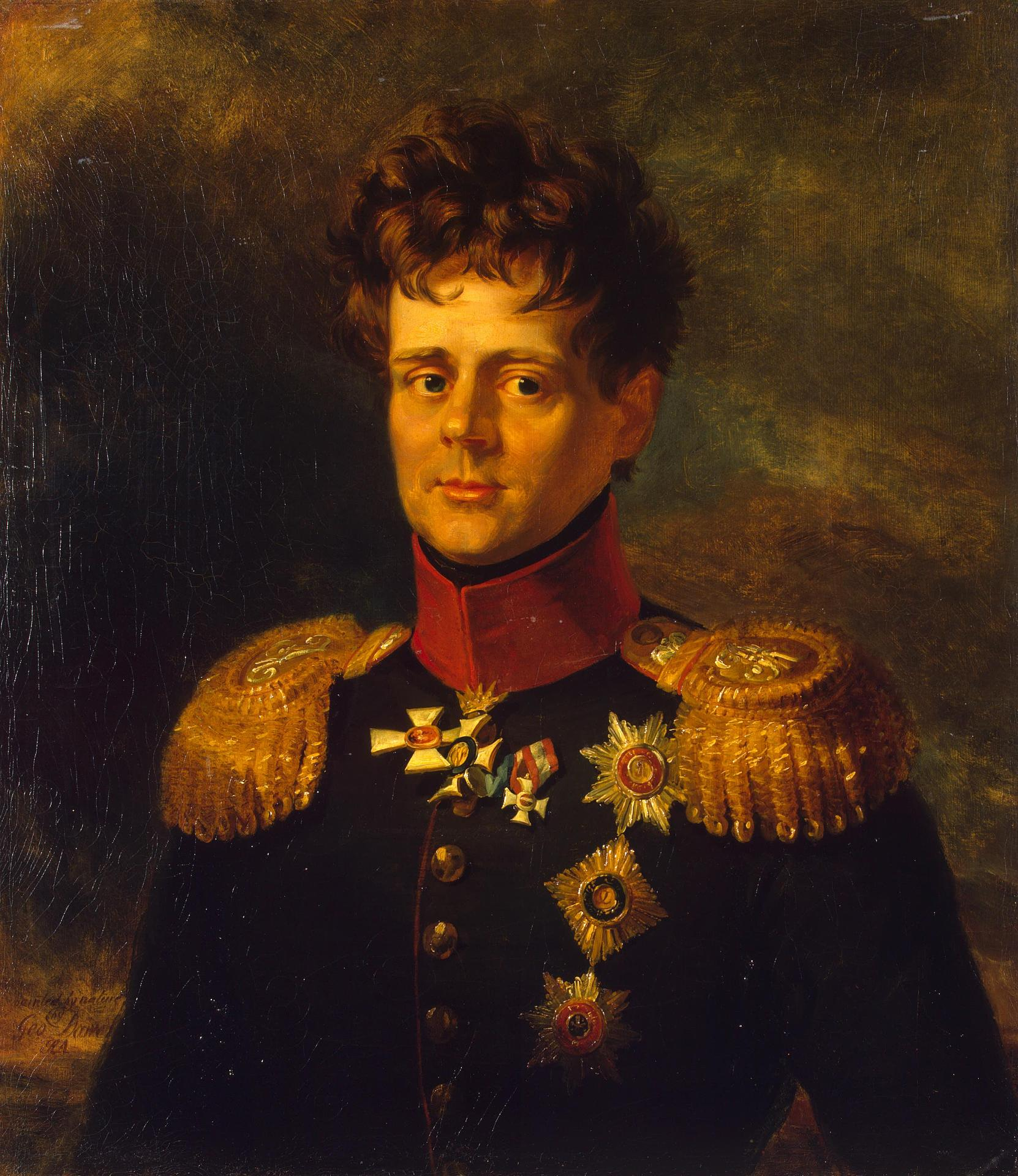
- Born: 8 January 1788; Oels, Kingdom of Prussia
- Died: 16 September 1857 (aged 69); Bad Carlsruhe, Kingdom of Prussia
- Spouse: Princess Mathilde of Waldeck and Pyrmont (m. 1817; died 1825) Princess Helene of Hohenlohe-Langenburg (m. 1827)
- Issue: Marie, Landgravine of Hesse-Philippsthal; Duke Eugen; Duke William Alexander; Duke William; Duchess Alexandrine; Duke Nicholas; Agnes, Princess Reuss Younger Line
Names
- German: Friedrich Eugen Carl Paul Ludwig
- House: House of Württemberg
- Father: Duke Eugen of Württemberg
- Mother: Princess Luise of Stolberg-Gedern

Duke Eugen of Württemberg (German: Herzog Friedrich Eugen Carl Paul Ludwig von Württemberg; 8 January 1788 – 16 September 1857) was a German prince and a general of the infantry in the Imperial Russian Army during the Napoleonic Wars.

== Early life and family ==
Duke Eugen was born at Oels, Lower Silesia, Kingdom of Prussia (now Oleśnica, Poland). He was the first child of Princess Louise of Stolberg-Gedern and her husband Duke Eugen of Württemberg, who was the brother of Empress Maria Feodorovna, the consort of Paul I of Russia. Louise was a daughter of Prince Christian Karl of Stolberg-Gedern and Countess Eleanore of Reuss-Lobenstein. Another of Eugen and Louise's children was the explorer Duke Paul Wilhelm of Württemberg.

From 1776 he lived in Russia. As a child, Eugen followed his aunt to the Tsar's court. After his cadet years in St. Petersburg, he began a brilliant career in the Imperial Russian Army. The murder of his uncle Paul I in 1801 interrupted his first military service. His further education took place in Silesia by Ludwig von Wolzogen.

== Military career ==
After a few years his military career resumed, and by 1805 he was already a major-general. He participated in the campaigns from 1806 to 1807 in East Prussia against France and 1810 in part of Turkey. He accompanied his father Eugen, who was the commander of the Prussian Reserve, in 1806. He joined the staff of the Russian general Bennigsen. In 1812, he was the commander of the 4th Division of II Corps, under Barclay de Tolly. During the French invasion of Russia he fought at the Battles of Borodino and Krasnoi. During the War of the Sixth Coalition, he fought in five major battles. In the Battle of Lutzen, Eugen's corps was heavily engaged and suffered many casualties recapturing villages from the French. In the Battle of Bautzen, Eugen's men, acting as the Russian rearguard, slowed the French advance by defending positions on hills and behind a village. The slow advance of the French infuriated Napoleon, who took over the command of the advance guard personally-but he did no better. In the Battle of Dresden, the heavily outnumbered Eugen held off the forces of the French general Vandamme for a day before retreating. In the battle of Kulm, Eugen suffered over 3,000 casualties in his victorious rematch with Vandamme. And in the Battle of Leipzig, most of Eugen's artillery was destroyed by the French. Despite this, and despite the losses at Kulm only a few weeks before, Eugen's infantry made a heroic, tenacious stand. Two-thirds of his troops and all of his regimental commanders became casualties.

In 1828, he commanded the Russian 7th Army Corps in the Russo-Turkish War (1828–1829). He retired after the Treaty of Adrianople.

== Music ==
He was interested in music. He was acquainted with Carl Maria von Weber, who was his father's music director (1806–1807). He also composed several operas, and many songs, including "The Ghost Bride".

== Marriage and issue ==
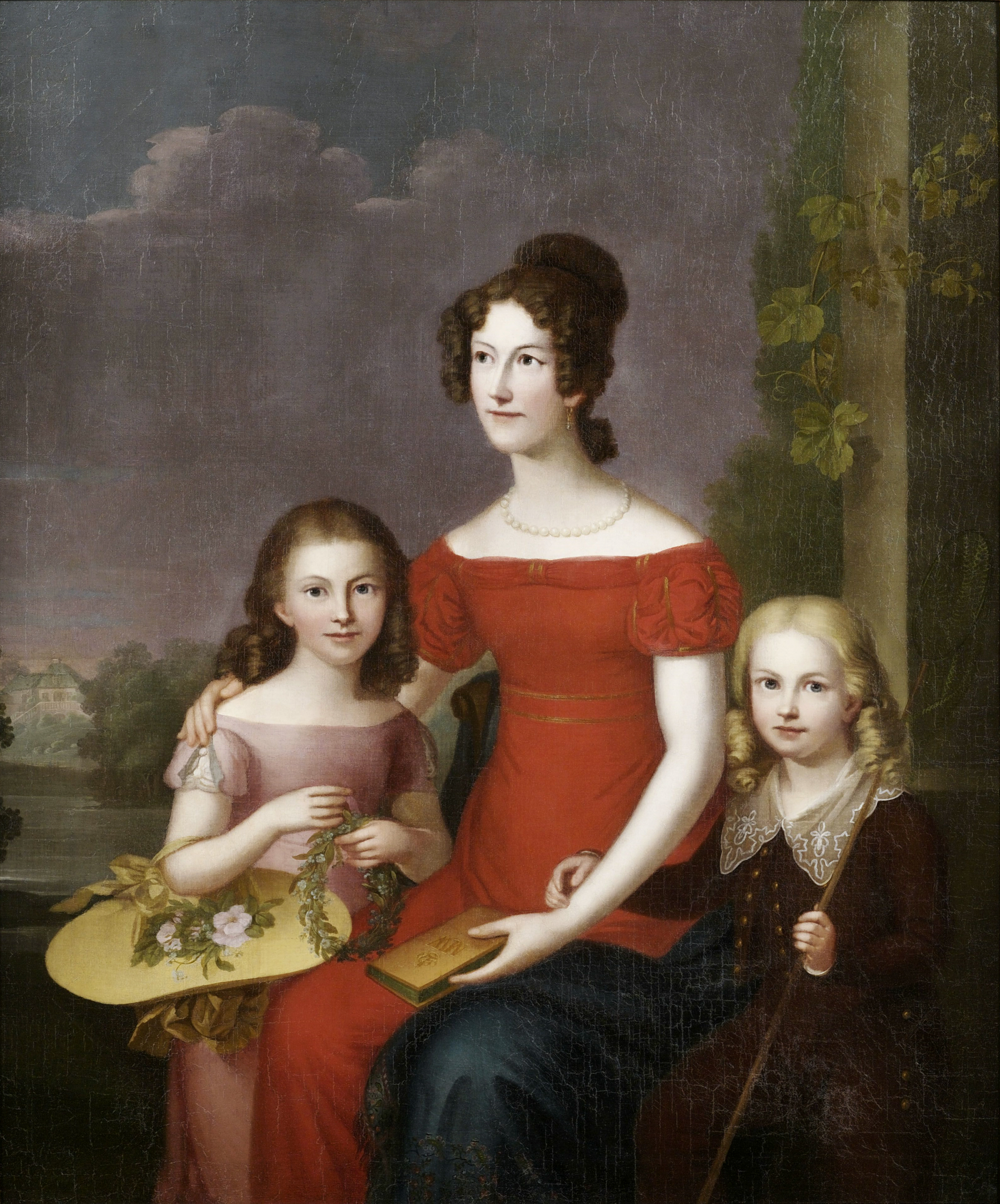
Eugen's first wife Mahthilde, with their son Eugen and daughter Marie. Portrait by Carl Rothe, c. 1820s

On 21 January 1817, in Arolsen, he married Princess Mathilde of Waldeck and Pyrmont, daughter of George I, Prince of Waldeck and Pyrmont and his wife, Princess Augusta of Schwarzburg-Sondershausen. They had three children:

- Duchess Marie of Württemberg (25 March 1818 – 10 April 1888), married in 1845 to Charles II, Landgrave of Hesse-Philippsthal, had issue.
- Duke Eugen of Württemberg (25 December 1820 – 8 January 1875), married in 1843 to Princess Mathilde of Schaumburg-Lippe, had issue.
- Duke William Alexander of Württemberg (13 April 1825 – 15 April 1825)

On his first wife's death, in 1827 Eugen married Princess Helene of Hohenlohe-Langenburg, daughter of Charles Louis, Prince of Hohenlohe-Langenburg and his wife, Countess Amalie of Solms-Baruth. They had four children:

- Duke William of Württemberg (20 July 1828 – 5 November 1896)
- Duchess Alexandrine Mathilde of Württemberg (16 December 1829 – 2 September 1913)
- Duke Nicholas of Württemberg (1 March 1833 – 22 February 1903), married in 1868 his half-niece Duchess Wilhelmine of Württemberg, no issue.
- Duchess Agnes of Württemberg (13 October 1835 – 10 July 1886), married in 1858 to Heinrich XIV, Prince Reuss Younger Line, had issue.

== Notes and sources ==
Sources

- The Royal House of Stuart, London, 1969, 1971, 1976, Addington, A. C., Reference: page 222
