= Johann von Appel =

Austro-Hungarian general and administrator

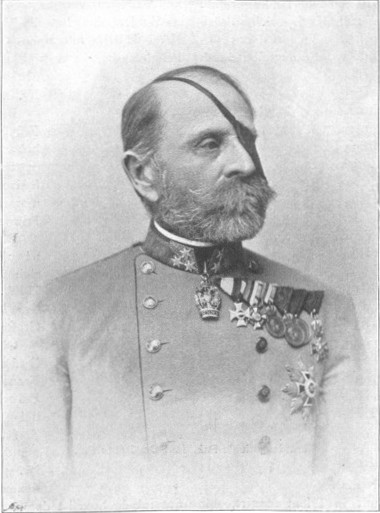
Johann von Appel, 1900

Johann Freiherr von Appel (also Baron Johann von Appel), (born 11 November 1826, Sikirevci, Slavonski Brod; died 7 September 1906, Gradisca d'Isonzo) was an Austro-Hungarian general and administrator. He was the Austrian governor of Bosnia and Herzegovina between 1882 and 1903.

Preceded by Hermann Dahlen	Governor of Bosnia and Herzegovina; 9 August 1882 - 8 December 1903	Succeeded by Eugen von Albori
