= Anton von Winzor =

Governor of Bosnia and Herzegovina (1844–1910)

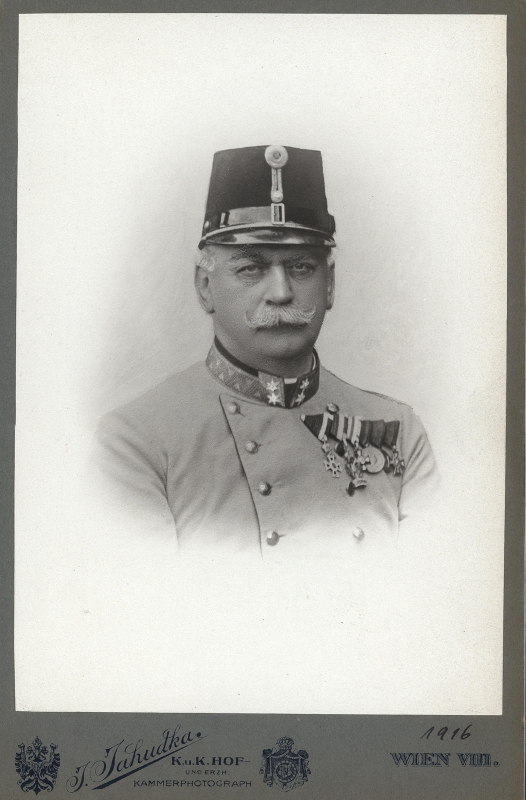
Anton von Winzor

Anton Freiherr von Winzor (1844–1910) was Governor of Bosnia and Herzegovina between 1907 and 1909, and also the first governor of Bosnia and Herzegovina after its annexation in 1908. He was born in Jaroslavice.

Preceded by Eugen von Albori	Governor of Bosnia and Herzegovina; 30 June 1907 - 7 March 1909	Succeeded by Marijan Varešanin
