= Jaroslavice =

- Municipality
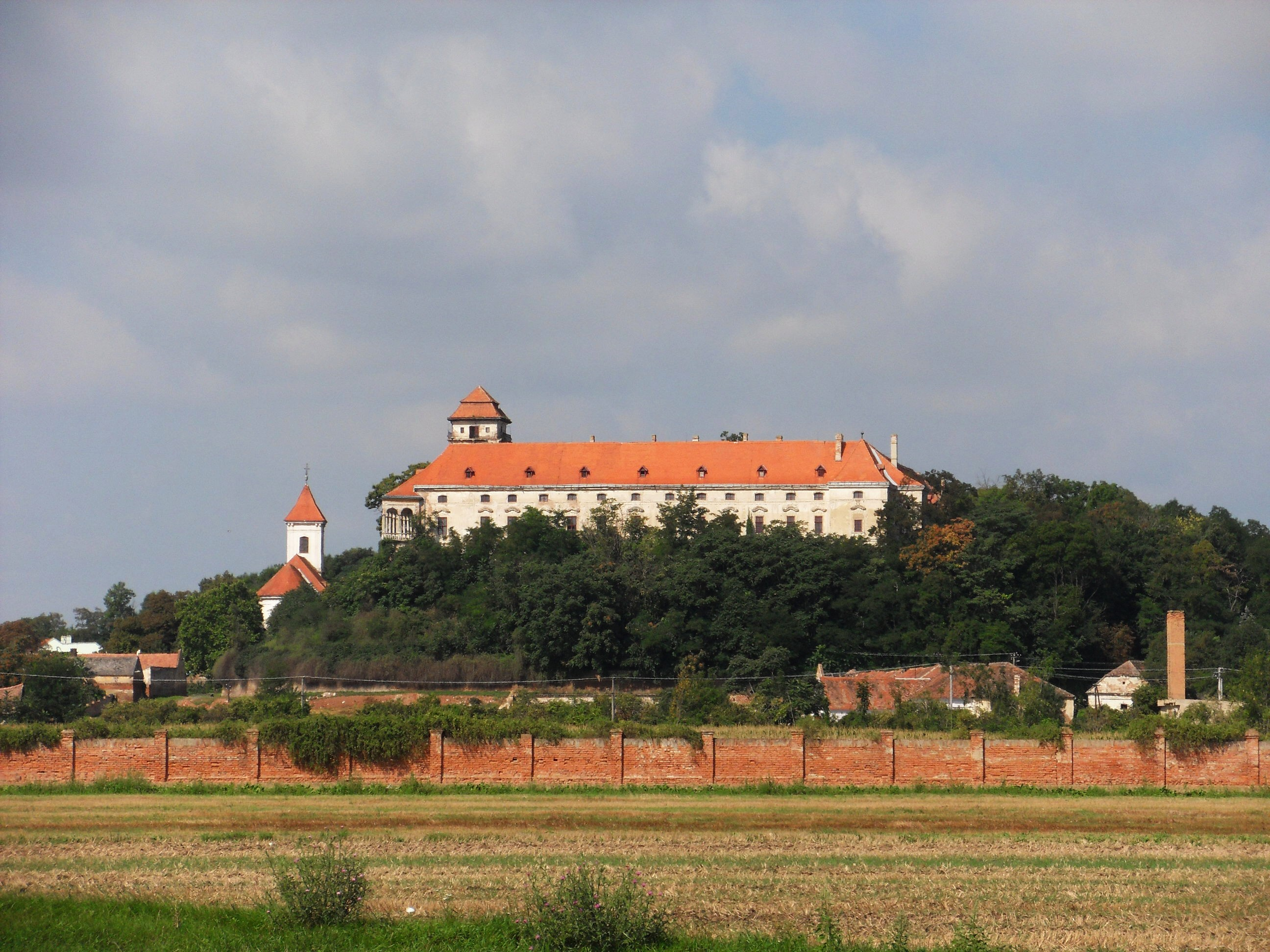
- Jaroslavice Castle

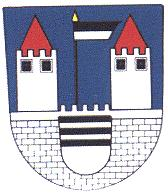
- Coat of arms

- Location in the Czech Republic
- Coordinates: 48°45′24″N 16°14′0″E
- Country: Czech Republic
- Region: South Moravian
- District: Znojmo
- First mentioned: 1249

Area
  - Total: 15.78 km^{2} (6.09 sq mi)
- Elevation: 189 m (620 ft)

Population (2026-01-01)
  - Total: 1,244
  - Density: 78.83/km^{2} (204.2/sq mi)
- Time zone: UTC+1 (CET)
  - Summer (DST): UTC+2 (CEST)
- Postal code: 671 28
- Website: www.obec-jaroslavice.cz

Jaroslavice (German: Joslowitz) is a municipality and village in Znojmo District in the South Moravian Region of the Czech Republic. It has about 1,200 inhabitants.

Jaroslavice lies approximately 19 kilometres (12 mi) south-east of Znojmo, 57 km (35 mi) south-west of Brno, and 198 km (123 mi) south-east of Prague.

== Demographics ==
Historical population
| Year | Pop. | ±% |
|---|---|---|
| 1869 | 1,904 | — |
| 1880 | 2,041 | +7.2% |
| 1890 | 2,182 | +6.9% |
| 1900 | 2,223 | +1.9% |
| 1910 | 2,408 | +8.3% |
| 1921 | 2,544 | +5.6% |
| 1930 | 2,598 | +2.1% |
| 1950 | 1,263 | −51.4% |
| 1961 | 1,322 | +4.7% |
| 1970 | 1,241 | −6.1% |
| 1980 | 1,194 | −3.8% |
| 1991 | 1,161 | −2.8% |
| 2001 | 1,239 | +6.7% |
| 2011 | 1,273 | +2.7% |
| 2021 | 1,207 | −5.2% |
Source: Censuses

== Notable people ==
- Anton von Winzor (1844–1910), Governor of Bosnia and Herzegovina
