= Siegfried Translateur =

German conductor and composer

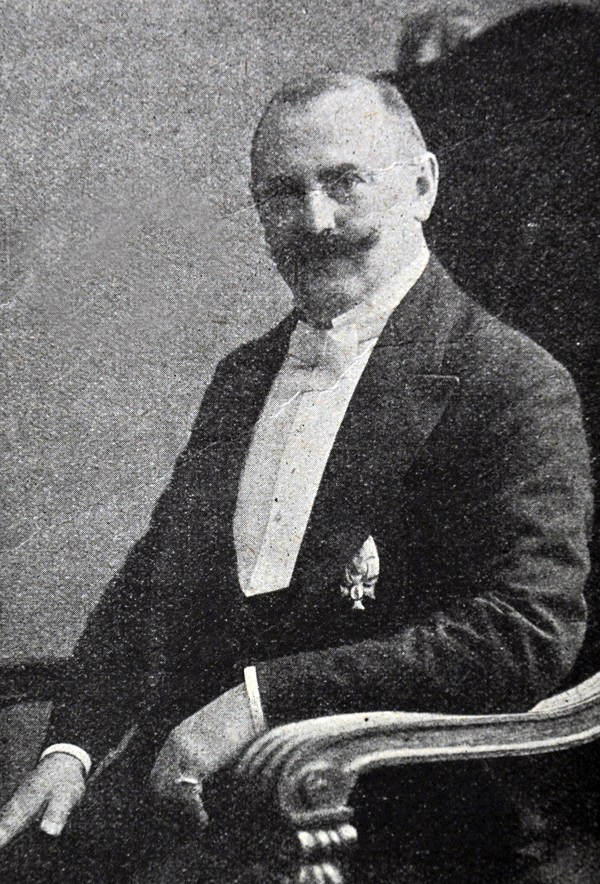
- Born: 19 June 1875; Bad Carlsruhe, Prov. Silesia, Royal Prussia, German Empire (now Pokój, Poland)
- Died: 1 March 1944 (aged 68); Theresienstadt concentration camp, German-occupied Czechoslovakia (now Terezín, Czech Republic)
- Occupations: conductor, composer, music editor
- Notable work: Wiener Praterleben

Salo Siegfried Translateur, or Siegfried "Salo" Translateur, Hebrew: זיגפריד "סאלו" טרנסלטור (19 June 1875 – 1 March 1944) was a German conductor and composer of waltzes, marches, and other light dance music. Today he is most famous for his Wiener Praterleben waltz, which became popular as Sportpalastwalzer in 1920s Berlin.

== Biography ==
Siegfried Translateur was born in Carlsruhe in Upper Silesia, in the Province of Silesia, Kingdom of Prussia, German Empire (Pokój in Poland), the natural son of Rosaline Translateur (1858 in Lublin, Lublin Governorate, Congress Poland, Russian Empire – 1934, Moravský Krumlov) and an unknown father, and adopted child of her later husband, the ḥazzān Salomon Lagodzinsky (c.1857, [?] – 1915). He started his music studies in Breslau, Vienna, and Leipzig, and also learned from a French composer of dance music, Émile Waldteufel. In 1900, he moved to Berlin, where he became an orchestra conductor.

Translateur's entertainment music became increasingly popular; his orchestra played on international tours and even in the presence of Emperor Wilhelm II. In 1911, he founded the "Lyra" music publishing company in Berlin-Wilmersdorf. It mostly published his own works, but also compositions by José Armándola, Marc Roland, Franz von Blon and Paul Lincke, among others. Translateur's son Hans Translateur later joined his father in the business, and the publishing house was renamed to "Lyra Translateur & Co".

After the Nazi seizure of power in 1933, Translateur, having been deemed a "half-Jew" (Mischling) by the Nuremberg Laws, was forced to liquidate "Lyra", and was barred from the Reich Music Chamber which meant a professional ban. He sold his publishing house to the London publisher Bosworth in 1938. Not much is known about what happened to him after that. Translateur, along with his wife, was deported from Berlin to the Theresienstadt concentration camp on 19 April 1943. He died there on 1 March 1944, at the age of sixty-eight.

== Works ==
Author of about 200 works, Translateur's most famous piece remains the Wiener Praterleben waltz (opus 12), which he wrote in 1892 at the age of seventeen while attending the Vienna conservatory. It became widely known as the Sportpalastwalzer ("Sports Palace Waltz"), because it has been played regularly during the "Six-days" cycle races at the Berlin Sportpalast from 1923 onwards. Up to today, it is played at the current Velodrom track cycling arena.

Many of his works were titled in reference to a current event, such as the German warrior quadrille for piano, opus 45, and Automotive march for orchestra, Op 154.

Was Blumen träumen, Op. 156
Character piece, first published in 1911
