= Karl Wilhelm, Duke of Saxe-Meiningen =

Karl Wilhelm
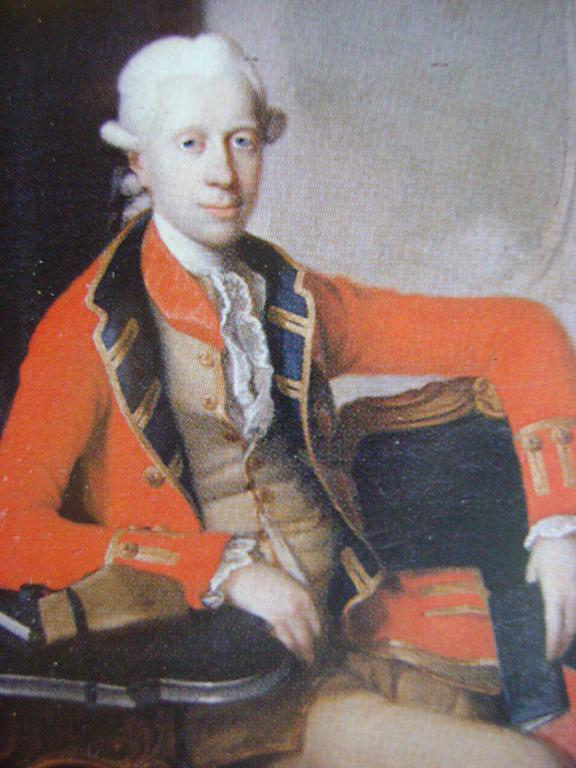
- 18th-century portrait

Duke of Saxe-Meiningen
- Reign: 27 January 1763 – 21 July 1782
- Predecessor: Anton Ulrich
- Successor: Georg I
- Regent: The Dowager Duchess
- Born: 19 November 1754; Frankfurt, Frankfurt, Holy Roman Empire
- Died: 21 July 1782 (aged 27); Sonneberg, Saxe-Coburg-Saalfeld, Holy Roman Empire
- Spouse: Louise of Stolberg-Gedern (m. 1780)
Names
- August Frederick Karl Wilhelm
- House: Saxe-Meiningen
- Father: Anton Ulrich, Duke of Saxe-Meiningen
- Mother: Charlotte Amalie of Hesse-Philippsthal
- Religion: Lutheranism

August Friedrich Karl Wilhelm, Duke of Saxe-Meiningen (19 November 1754 – 21 July 1782), was a duke of Saxe-Meiningen.

== Family ==
He was the first son of Anton Ulrich, Duke of Saxe-Meiningen and Charlotte Amalie of Hesse-Philippsthal.

== Reign ==
August Friedrich succeeded his father in the duchy of Saxe-Meiningen (1763) when he was only eight years old. Because of this, his mother, the Dowager Duchess Charlotte Amalie, acted as regent during his minority, which ended in 1779. He was succeeded by his last younger surviving brother, Georg.

== Marriage ==
In Gedern on 5 June 1780, Karl Wilhelm married Louise of Stolberg-Gedern. They had no children. The widowed Louise later married Duke Eugen of Württemberg and had issue.

== Ancestry ==
Ancestors of Karl Wilhelm, Duke of Saxe-Meiningen

16. Johann II, Duke of Saxe-Weimar
8. Ernest I, Duke of Saxe-Gotha
17. Princess Dorothea Maria of Anhalt
4. Bernhard I, Duke of Saxe-Meiningen
18. Johann Philipp, Duke of Saxe-Altenburg
9. Princess Elisabeth Sophie of Saxe-Altenburg
19. Duchess Elisabeth of Brunswick-Wolfenbüttel
2. Anton Ulrich, Duke of Saxe-Meiningen
20. Augustus the Younger, Duke of Brunswick-Lüneburg
10. Anthony Ulrich, Duke of Brunswick-Wolfenbüttel
21. Princess Dorothea of Anhalt-Zerbst
5. Duchess Elisabeth Eleonore of Brunswick-Wolfenbüttel
22. Frederick, Duke of Schleswig-Holstein-Sønderburg-Norburg
11. Duchess Elizabeth Juliana of Schleswig-Holstein-Sonderburg-Norburg
23. Princess Eleanor of Anhalt-Zerbst
1. Karl Wilhelm, Duke of Saxe-Meiningen
24. William VI, Landgrave of Hesse-Kassel
12. Philip, Landgrave of Hesse-Philippsthal
25. Margravine Hedwig Sophie of Brandenburg
6. Charles I, Landgrave of Hesse-Philippsthal
26. Carl Otto, Count of Solms-Laubach
13. Countess Catherine of Solms-Laubach
27. Countess Amöna Elisabeth of Bentheim-Steinfurt
3. Landgravine Charlotte Amalie of Hesse-Philippsthal
28. John George I, Duke of Saxe-Eisenach
14. John William III, Duke of Saxe-Eisenach
29. Countess Johannetta of Sayn-Wittgenstein
7. Princess Christine of Saxe-Eisenach
30. Charles Gustav of Baden-Durlach
15. Margravine Christine Juliane of Baden-Durlach
31. Duchess Anna Sophie of Brunswick-Wolfenbüttel

Karl Wilhelm, Duke of Saxe-Meiningen House of Saxe-Meiningen Cadet branch of the House of Wettin Born: 19 November 1754 Died: 21 July 1782
Regnal titles
Preceded by Anton Ulrich	Duke of Saxe-Meiningen; 1763–1782	Succeeded by Georg I
