= Eugen von Albori =

Austrian administrator

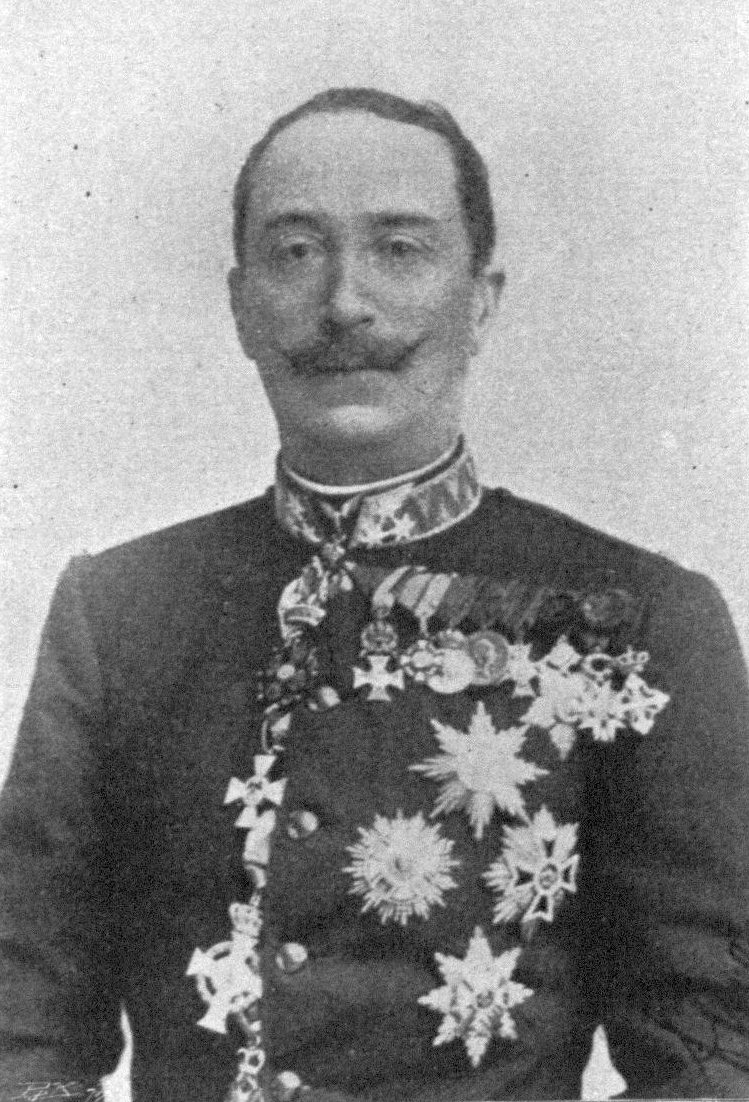
- von Albori in 1900

Governor of Bosnia and Herzegovina
- In office 8 December 1903 – 25 June 1907
- Preceded by: Johann von Appel
- Succeeded by: Anton von Winzor

Personal details
- Born: August 27, 1838 Kotor, Austrian Empire
- Died: September 4, 1915 (aged 77) Vienna, Austria-Hungary
- Profession: Politician

Eugen Freiherr von Albori (or also known as Baron Eugen von Albori; 27 September 1838 – 4 September 1915) was an Austrian administrator. He served as the Austrian governor of Bosnia & Herzegovina between 1903 and 1907.

== Notes ==
Preceded by Johann von Appel	Governor of Bosnia and Herzegovina; 8 December 1903 - 25 June 1907	Succeeded by Anton von Winzor
