= Princess Helene of Hohenlohe-Langenburg =

- Duchess Eugen of Württemberg
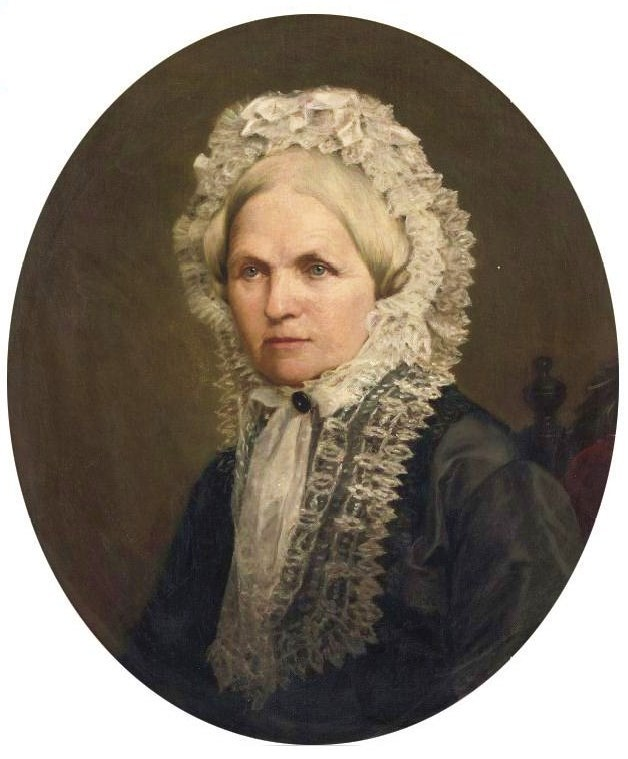
- Born: 22 November 1807; Langenburg, Kingdom of Württemberg
- Died: 5 September 1880 (aged 72); Schleiz, Principality of Reuss-Gera, German Empire
- Spouse: Duke Eugen of Württemberg (1788–1857) (m. 1827; died 1857)
- Issue: Duke William; Duchess Alexandrine; Duke Nicholas; Agnes, Princess Reuss Younger Line
Names
- German: Helene
- House: House of Hohenlohe-Langenburg; House of Württemberg
- Father: Karl Ludwig III, Prince of Hohenlohe-Langenburg
- Mother: Countess Amalie Henriette of Solms-Baruth

Princess Helene of Hohenlohe-Langenburg (22 November 1807 – 5 September 1880) was a member of the House of Hohenlohe-Langenburg and a Princess of Hohenlohe-Langenburg by birth and a member of the House of Württemberg and a Duchess of Württemberg as the second wife of Duke Eugen of Württemberg.

== Family ==
Helene was the twelfth child and the ninth daughter of Karl Ludwig III, Prince von Hohenlohe-Langenburg and Countess Amalie Henriette of Solms-Baruth. She was a younger sister of Ernst I, Prince of Hohenlohe-Langenburg, brother-in-law of Queen Victoria of the United Kingdom.

== Marriage and issue ==
On 11 September 1827, Princess Helene married Duke Eugen of Württemberg (1788–1857), son of Duke Eugen of Württemberg (1758–1822) and Princess Luise of Stolberg-Gedern (1764–1828), first cousin of the better known Countess of Albany. Duke Eugen was a widower of Princess Mathilde of Waldeck and Pyrmont (1801–1825), daughter of George I, Prince of Waldeck and Pyrmont by whom he had had three children. By Helene, Duke Eugen had other four children:

- Duke William of Württemberg (20 July 1828 – 5 November 1896)
- Duchess Alexandrine Mathilde of Württemberg (16 December 1829 – 2 September 1913)
- Duke Nicholas of Württemberg (1 March 1833 – 22 February 1903), married in 1868 his niece Duchess Wilhelmine of Württemberg, no issue.
- Duchess Agnes of Württemberg (13 October 1835 – 10 July 1886), married in 1858 to Heinrich XIV, Prince Reuss Younger Line, had issue.

== Ancestry ==
Ancestors of Princess Helene of Hohenlohe-Langenburg

8. Louis, Prince of Hohenlohe-Langenburg
4. Christian Albert, Prince of Hohenlohe-Langenburg
9. Princess Eleanore of Nassau-Saarbrücken
2. Karl Ludwig III, Prince of Hohenlohe-Langenburg
10. Frederick Charles of Stolberg-Gedern
5. Princess Carolina of Stolberg-Gedern
11. Princess Louise of Nassau-Saarbrücken
1. Princess Helene of Hohenlohe-Langenburg
12. Johann Carl, Count of Solms-Baruth
6. Johann Christian II, Count of Solms-Baruth
13. Countess Henriette Louise Wilhelmine of Lippe-Biesterfeld
3. Countess Amalie Henriette of Solms-Baruth
14. Heinrich VI, Count Reuss of Köstritz
7. Countess Friederike Reuss of Köstritz
15. Enriqueta Juana Francisca Susana Casado y Huguetan, Marchioness of Monteleone
