= Hermann, Freiherr Dahlen von Orlaburg =

Hermann Freiherr Dahlen von Orlaburg
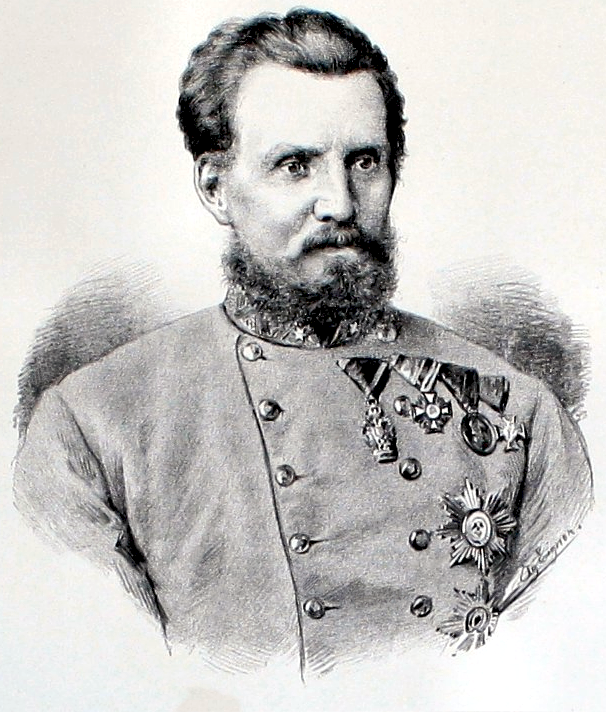
- Hermann, Freiherr Dahlen-Orlaburg (1870)
- Born: 10 January 1828; Kassa, Kingdom of Hungary, Austrian Empire
- Died: 15 November 1887 (aged 59); Vienna, Austria-Hungary
- Occupation: Administrator of the Government

Hermann Freiherr Dahlen von Orlaburg (10 January 1828 – 15 November 1887) was an Austrian administrator. He was the Austrian governor of Bosnia and Herzegovina from 1881 to 1882.

He died in Vienna on 15 November 1887. He is buried at the Olšany Cemetery in Prague.

Preceded by Wilhelm Nikolaus	Governor of Bosnia and Herzegovina; 6 April 1881 – 9 August 1882	Succeeded by Johann von Appel
