= Karl von Luz =

German politician (1824–1899)

Karl von Luz (3 August 1824 – 6 November 1899) was a Württembergian politician and civil servant. He served as a Member of the Chamber of Deputies, the lower house of the Parliament of the Kingdom of Württemberg, from 1876 to 1877 and from 1880 until his death. In 1887 he was appointed as district president (Regierungspräsident) and thus head of one of the kingdom's regional government authorities.

He received the Knight's Cross First Class of the Order of the Crown, which conferred personal ennoblement, in 1880, and was promoted to Commander of the same order in 1889. He also received several other orders of merit, and became an honorary citizen of Altensteig and Reutlingen in 1896.

His daughter Helene was the mother of Field Marshal Erwin Rommel.
