= Hans von Feldmann =

Hans von Feldmann (7 November 1868 in Berlin – 10 July 1940 in Hannover) was a German officer and politician.

== Life ==
Feldmann was the son of Prussian Major General Adolf Feldmann (1828–1894) and his wife Jenny Lührsen (1841–1917). His grandparents from mother's side were the lawyer and first officer of the Hamburg Mortgage Management Dr. Gustav Lührsen (1805–1868) and his wife Charlotte Jauch (1811–1872). His uncle was the Imperial-German extraordinary ambassador and Minister John Lührsen (1838–1903), his brother was the chief of operations in the Turkish High Command in World War I and later Reichstag deputy Otto von Feldmann (1873–1945).

After school Feldmann came on 22 March 1887 as second lieutenant to the 1. Hannoversches Infanterie-Regiment Nr. 74 of the Prussian Army. After completion of the Military Academy and other troops he was used in April 1907 in the Prussian Ministry of War. There Feldmann rose in 1913 to department chief. Parallel he took as a front-line officer part in World War I and was last Colonel and commander of the 43rd Infantry Brigade. After the November Revolution Feldmann was taken in the Reichswehr. Mid-1919, he worked as a liaison officer of the GHQ in government of Weimar Republic in Weimar. 1919–20 he was chief of the Ordnance Office of the High Command in the Ministry of the Reichswehr. After his appointment to Major General he was from 1920 to 1922 Chief of Army Administration (Quartermaster general). In 1922, he retired with character as Lieutenant General from the Reichswehr.

== Public offices ==
Feldmann officiated from 1 October 1920 to 7 April 1922 as Secretary of State in the Defense Ministry. Feldmann was the successor of the first in March 1920 ordered but in September forced out of office "civilian" and Socialist Christian Stock. After Feldmann's resignation due to differences with the chief of the army command Hans von Seeckt no successor has been appointed.

== Awards ==
- Order of the Red Eagle IV. Class with crown
- Kronenorden III. Class
- Bavarian Military Merit IV class with crown.
- Knight's Cross First Class of the Order of Henry the Lion
- Knights Cross II class of Herzoglich Saxony-Ernestine House Order.
- Knight's Cross of the Order of the Württemberg Crown

== Literature ==
- Dermot Bradley (Hrsg.), Karl-Friedrich Hildebrand, Markus Rövekamp: Die Generale des Heeres 1921–1945. Die militärischen Werdegänge der Generale, sowie der Ärzte, Veterinäre, Intendaten, Richter und Ministerialbeamten im Generalsrang. Band 3: Dahlmann–Fitzlaff. Biblio Verlag. Osnabrück 1994. ISBN 3-7648-2443-3. S. 439–440.
