= Princess Louise of Stolberg-Gedern (1764–1834) =

German princess

Louise of Stolberg-Gedern
- Duchess Eugen of Württemberg
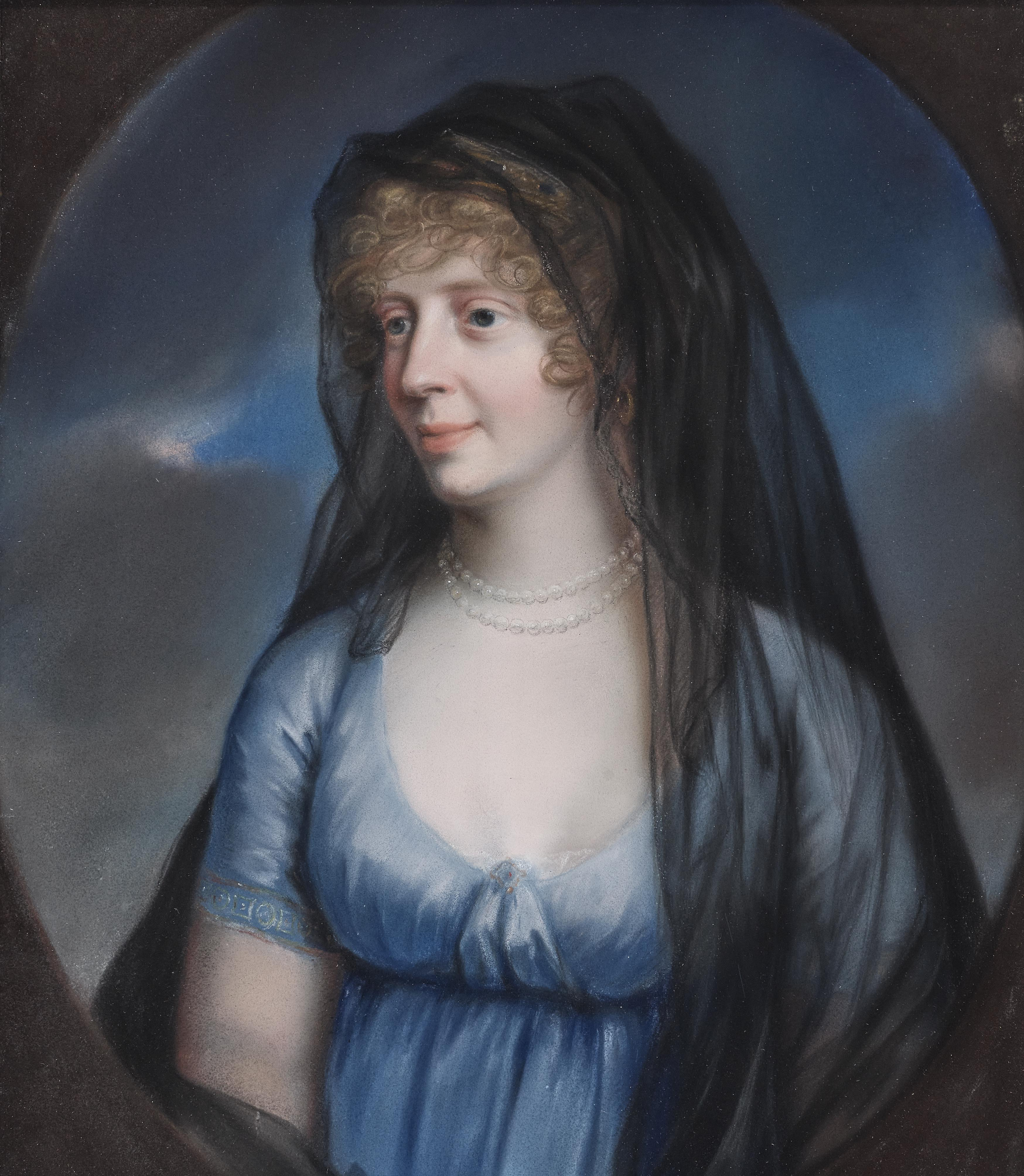

Duchess consort of Saxe-Meiningen
- Tenure: 5 June 1780 – 21 July 1782
- Born: 13 October 1764; Gedern
- Died: 24 May 1834 (aged 69); Carlsruhe (Pokój), Silesia
- Spouse: Karl Wilhelm, Duke of Saxe-Meiningen (m. 1780; died 1782) Duke Eugen of Württemberg (m. 1787; died 1822)
- Issue: Duke Eugen; Louise, Princess of Hohenlohe-Oehringen; Duke Georg Ferdinand; Duke Heinrich; Duke Paul Wilhelm
- House: Stolberg
- Father: Christian Karl, Prince of Stolberg-Gedern
- Mother: Countess Eleonore of Reuss-Lobenstein

Louise of Stolberg-Gedern (13 October 1764 – 24 May 1834) was a German noblewoman, by birth member of the House of Stolberg and by her two marriages Duchess of Saxe-Meiningen and Württemberg.

== Early life ==
Born in Gedern, she was the second child of Christian Karl, Prince of Stolberg-Gedern and his wife Countess Eleonore of Reuss-Lobenstein. She was born three months after her father's death, on 21 July 1764.

== Marriages and issue ==
In Gedern on 5 June 1780, Louise married firstly Karl Wilhelm, Duke of Saxe-Meiningen. Their childless union lasted only two years until Karl Wilhelm's death on 21 July 1782.

Five years later, on 21 January 1787 in Meiningen, Louise married secondly Duke Eugen, the third child of Frederick II Eugene, Duke of Württemberg, and brother of King Frederick I of Württemberg. They had five children:

- Duke Frederick Eugen Karl Paul Ludwig of Württemberg (Oleśnica [Öls], 18 January 1788 – Carlsruhe [Pokój], Silesia, 16 September 1857), married in 1817 to Princess Mathilde of Waldeck and Pyrmont, had issue; Married secondly in 1827 to Princess Helene of Hohenlohe-Langenburg, had issue.
- Duchess Friederike Sophie Dorothea Marie Luise of Württemberg (Oleśnica, 4 June 1789 – Slawentzitz, 26 June 1851), married in 1811 to Friedrich August Karl, Prince of Hohenlohe-Oehringen, had issue.
- Duke Frederick Karl Georg Ferdinand of Württemberg (Oleśnica, 15 June 1790 – Oleśnica, 25 December 1795).
- Duke Karl Frederick Heinrich of Württemberg (Oleśnica, 13 December 1792 – Carlsruhe, 28 November 1797).
- Duke Frederick Paul Wilhelm of Württemberg (Carlsruhe, 25 June 1797 – Mergentheim, 25 November 1860), married in 1827 to Princess Maria Sophia of Thurn and Taxis, had issue.

Louise died in Carlsruhe (now Pokój), Silesia, on 24 May 1834, aged 69, having survived her second husband and two of her children.

Princess Louise of Stolberg-Gedern (1764–1834) House of Stolberg Born: 13 October 1764 Died: 24 May 1834
Royal titles
Preceded by Charlotte Amalie of Hesse-Philippsthal	Duchess consort of Saxe-Meiningen; 1780-1782	Vacant Title next held by Louise Eleonore of Hohenlohe-Langenburg
