= Princess Mathilde of Waldeck and Pyrmont =

Duchess Eugen of Württemberg (1801–1825)

- Duchess Eugen of Württemberg
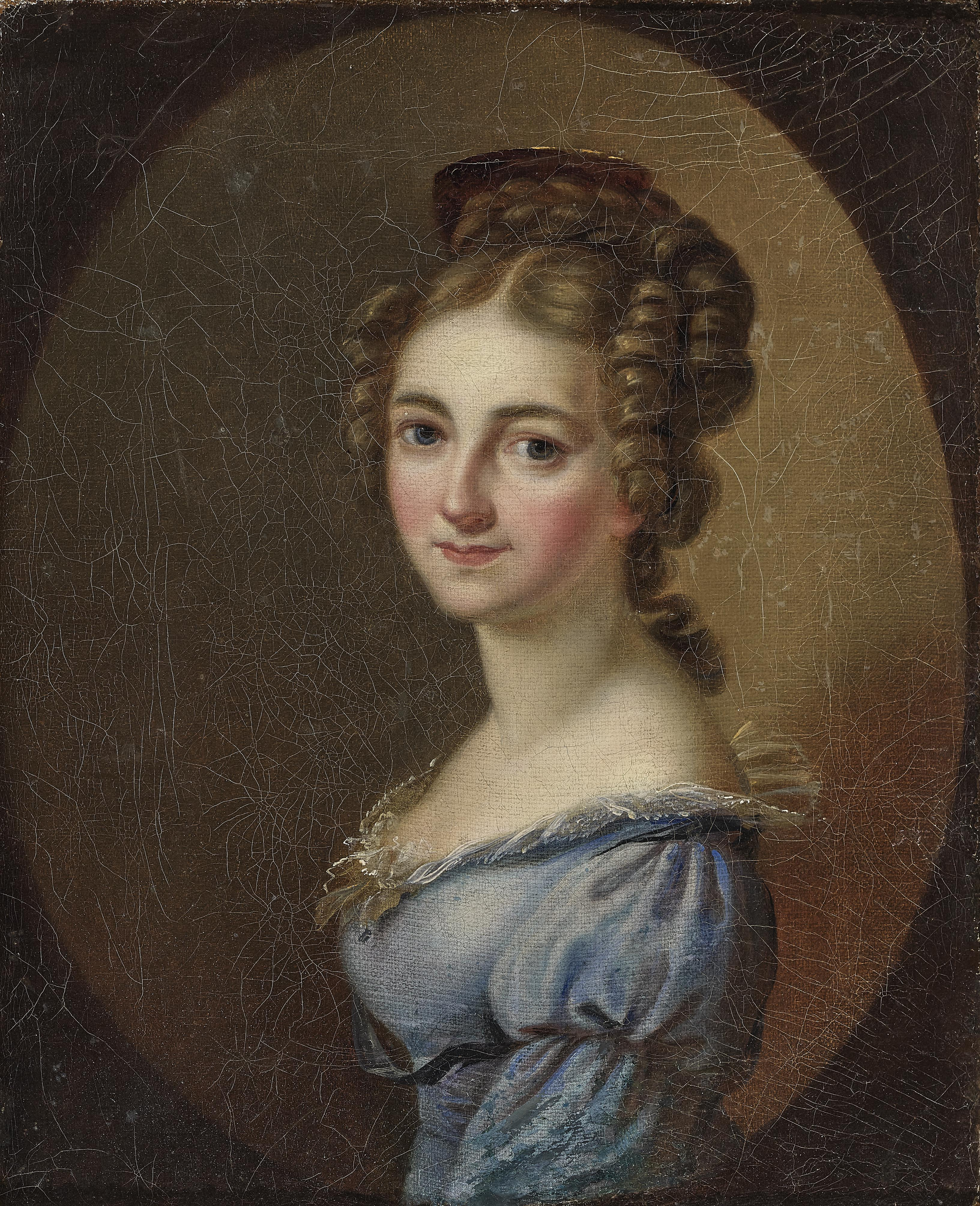
- Born: 10 April 1801; Rhoden, Principality of Waldeck and Pyrmont
- Died: 13 April 1825 (aged 24); Karlsruhe, Silesia
- Spouse: Duke Eugen of Württemberg (1788–1857) (m. 1817)
- Issue: Marie, Landgravine of Hesse-Philippsthal; Duke Eugen; Duke Alexander
Names
- German: Caroline Friederike Mathilde
- House: House of Waldeck-Pyrmont (by birth); House of Württemberg (by marriage)
- Father: George I, Prince of Waldeck and Pyrmont
- Mother: Princess Augusta of Schwarzburg-Sondershausen

Princess Mathilde of Waldeck and Pyrmont (German: Mathilde Prinzessin zu Waldeck und Pyrmont; 10 April 1801 – 13 April 1825) was a member of the House of Waldeck and Pyrmont and a Princess of Waldeck and Pyrmont and a member of the House of Württemberg and a Duchess of Württemberg through her marriage to Duke Eugen of Württemberg.

== Early life ==
Mathilde was born in Rhoden, Principality of Waldeck and Pyrmont, the fourth daughter and tenth child of George I, Prince of Waldeck and Pyrmont and his wife Princess Augusta of Schwarzburg-Sondershausen.

== Marriage and issue ==
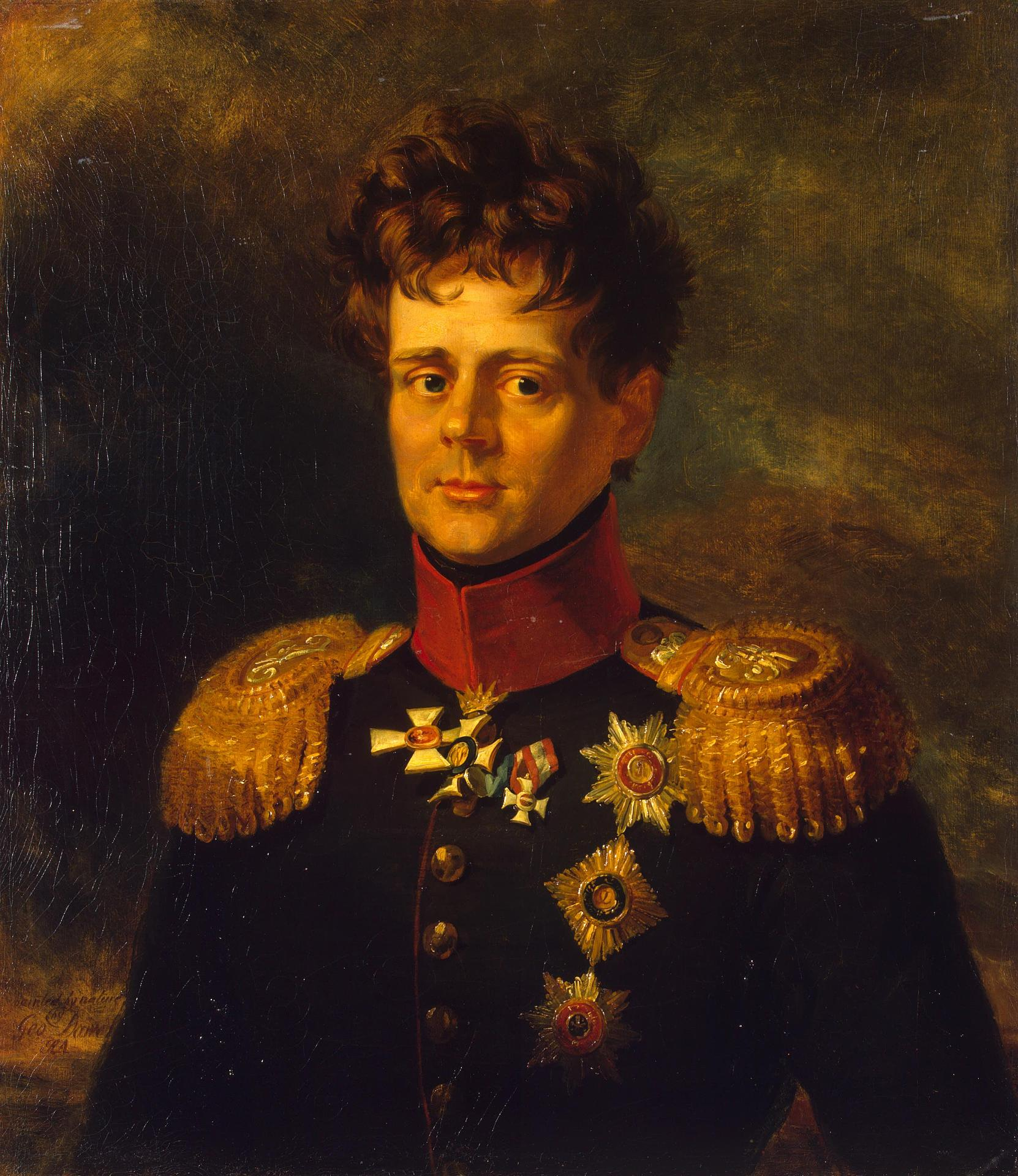
Her husband, Duke Eugen of Württemberg

On 20 April 1817, in Arolsen, she married Duke Eugen of Württemberg (1788–1857), son of Duke Eugen of Württemberg (1758–1822) and Princess Luise of Stolberg-Gedern (1764–1828), first cousin of the better known Countess of Albany). They had three children:

- Duchess Marie of Württemberg (25 March 1818 – 10 April 1888), married in 1845 to Charles II, Landgrave of Hesse-Philippsthal, had issue.
- Duke Eugen of Württemberg (25 December 1820 – 8 January 1875), married in 1843 to Princess Mathilde of Schaumburg-Lippe, had issue.
- Duke William Alexander of Württemberg (13 April 1825 – 15 April 1825)

Mathilde died while giving birth to her third child. In 1827, Eugene remarried to Princess Helene of Hohenlohe-Langenburg, with whom he had four children.

== Ancestry ==
Ancestors of Princess Mathilde of Waldeck and Pyrmont

8. Friedrich Anton Ulrich, Prince of Waldeck and Pyrmont
4. Karl August, Prince of Waldeck and Pyrmont
9. Countess Palatine Luise of Birkenfled-Bichwiller
2. George I, Prince of Waldeck and Pyrmont
10. Christian III, Count Palatine of Zweibrücken
5. Countess Palatine Christiane Henriette of Zweibrücken-Birkenfeld
11. Countess Carolina of Nassau-Sarrebrücken
1. Princess Mathilde of Waldeck and Pyrmont
12. August I, Prince of Schwarzburg-Sondershausen
6. August II, Prince of Schwarzburg-Sondershausen
13. Princess Charlotte Sophie of Anhalt-Bernburg
3. Princess Augusta of Schwarzburg-Sondershausen
14. Viktor Friedrich, Prince of Anhalt-Bernburg
7. Princess Christine of Anhalt-Bernburg
15. Princess Albertine of Brandenburg-Schwedt
