= Duke Eugen of Württemberg (1758–1822) =

Brother of Frederick I of Württemberg

Duke Eugen
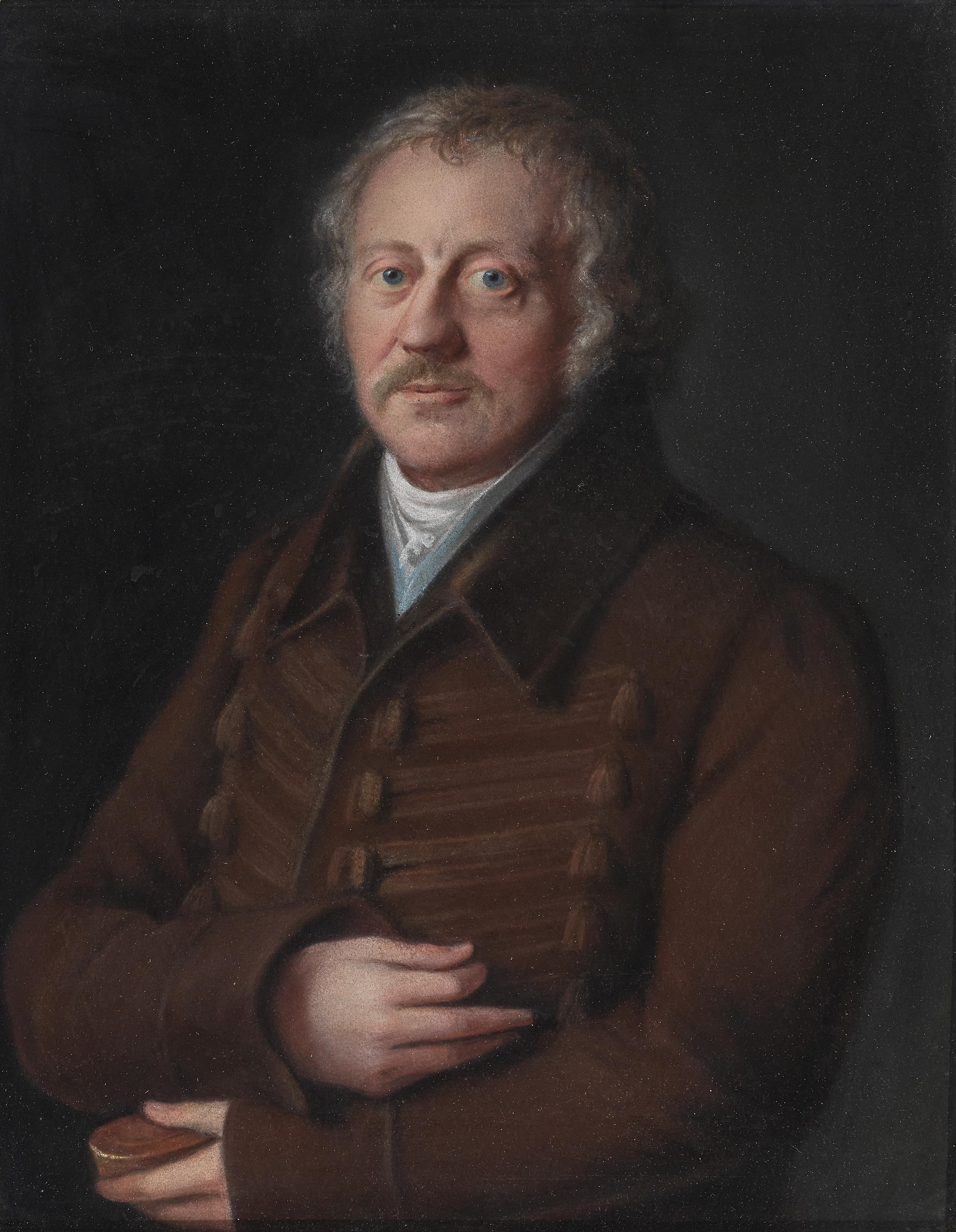
- Portrait, c. 1800–1812
- Born: 21 November 1758; Schwedt, Margraviate of Brandenburg
- Died: 20 June 1822 (aged 63); Meiningen, Saxe-Meiningen
- Spouse: Princess Louise of Stolberg-Gedern (m. 1787)
- Issue Detail: Duke Eugen; Louise, Princess of Hohenlohe-Oehringen; Duke Georg Ferdinand; Duke Heinrich; Duke Paul Wilhelm
Names
- German: Eugen Friedrich Heinrich
- House: Württemberg
- Father: Frederick II Eugene, Duke of Württemberg
- Mother: Margravine Sophia Dorothea of Brandenburg-Schwedt

Duke Eugen of Württemberg (German: Herzog Eugen Friedrich Heinrich von Württemberg; 21 November 1758 – 20 June 1822) was a German prince. He was the brother of Frederick I of Württemberg.

== Life ==
Duke Eugen was born at Schwedt, Margraviate of Brandenburg, the third child of Frederick II Eugene, Duke of Württemberg (son of Charles Alexander, Duke of Württemberg, and Princess Maria Augusta of Thurn and Taxis) and his wife, Margravine Sophia Dorothea of Brandenburg-Schwedt (daughter of Frederick William, Margrave of Brandenburg-Schwedt and Princess Sophia Dorothea of Prussia).

Eugen was educated by Johann Georg Schlosser, a brother of Johann Wolfgang von Goethe. The prince entered the Army of the Kingdom of Prussia. His regiment the Oleśnica Silesian Hussars being stationed, at that time, near the residence of Eugen's relatives, part of the Duchy of Oels. Whose last Duke Charles Christian Erdmann, left Eugen, in his will, and by fee-tail, the estate of Pokój, Carlsruhe Palace.

From 1795 Eugen was governor of the fortress of Glogau. In the War of the Fourth Coalition he commanded the Reserve of the Prussian Army. On 18 October 1806 he fought at the Battle of Halle where he was defeated by Marshal Jean Bernadotte (later became King Charles XIV John of Sweden).

Carlsruhe became the permanent residence of Duke Eugen, which he endowed with a theater and chapel. The Duke was a great patron of the composer Carl Maria von Weber, who became his secretary and in September 1806 he was designated as Kapellmeister at Carlsruhe. Eugen's son, distinguished himself in the War of the Sixth Coalition which led to the theater being closed, and Carl Maria von Weber dismissed. In 1820 Eugen built the Cavalier Homes on the Schlossplatz in Carlsruhe.

From 1820 until his death Eugen was a member of the First Chamber of the Estates of Württemberg though he never appeared in person to the meetings, being represented by Count Charles of Reischach.

== Marriage and issue ==
On 21 January 1787, in Meiningen, he married Princess Louise of Stolberg-Gedern, daughter of Prince Christian Karl of Stolberg-Gedern and Countess Eleonore Reuss of Lobenstein. Louise was the widow of Charles William, Duke of Saxe-Meiningen. They had five children:

- Duke Eugen of Württemberg (18 January 1788 – 16 September 1857), married in 1817 to Princess Mathilde of Waldeck and Pyrmont, had issue; Married secondly in 1827 to Princess Helene of Hohenlohe-Langenburg, had issue.
- Duchess Louise of Württemberg (4 June 1789 – 26 June 1851), married in 1811 to Friedrich August Karl, Prince of Hohenlohe-Oehringen, had issue. Louise and August were the parents of Hugo zu Hohenlohe-Öhringen.
- Duke Georg Ferdinand of Württemberg (15 June 1790 – 25 December 1795)
- Duke Heinrich of Württemberg (13 December 1792 –28 November 1797)
- Duke Paul Wilhelm of Württemberg (25 June 1797 – 25 November 1860), married in 1827 to Princess Maria Sophia of Thurn and Taxis, had issue.

== Ancestry ==
Ancestors of Duke Eugen of Württemberg (1758–1822)

16. Eberhard III, Duke of Württemberg
8. Frederick Charles, Duke of Württemberg-Winnental
17. Wild- and Rhinegravine Anna Dorothea
4. Charles Alexander, Duke of Württemberg
18. Albert II, Margrave of Brandenburg-Ansbach
9. Princess Eleonore Juliane of Brandenburg-Ansbach
19. Countess Sophie Margarete of Oettingen-Oettingen
2. Frederick II Eugene, Duke of Württemberg
20. Eugen Alexander Franz, Prince of Thurn and Taxis
10. Anselm Franz, Prince of Thurn and Taxis
21. Princess Anna Adelheid of Fürstenberg
5. Princess Marie Auguste of Thurn and Taxis
22. Ferdinand August, Prince of Lobkowicz
11. Princess Louise Anne of Lobkowicz
23. Princess Maria Anna of Baden-Baden
1. Duke Eugen of Württemberg
24. Frederick William, Elector of Brandenburg
12. Philip William, Margrave of Brandenburg-Schwedt
25. Princess Dorothea of Schleswig-Holstein-Sonderburg-Glücksburg
6. Frederick William, Margrave of Brandenburg-Schwedt
26. John George II, Prince of Anhalt-Dessau
13. Princess Johanna Charlotte of Anhalt-Dessau
27. Henriette Catherine of Nassau-Orange
3. Princess Friederike of Brandenburg-Schwedt
28. Frederick I of Prussia
14. Frederick William I of Prussia
29. Princess Sophia Charlotte of Hanover
7. Princess Sophia Dorothea of Prussia
30. George I of Great Britain
15. Princess Sophia Dorothea of Hanover
31. Princess Sophia Dorothea of Celle

== Notes and sources ==
- The Royal House of Stuart, London, 1969, 1971, 1976, Addington, A. C., Reference: page 222
- L'Allemagne dynastique, Huberty, Giraud, Magdelaine, Reference: vol II page 476.
