= Pokój =

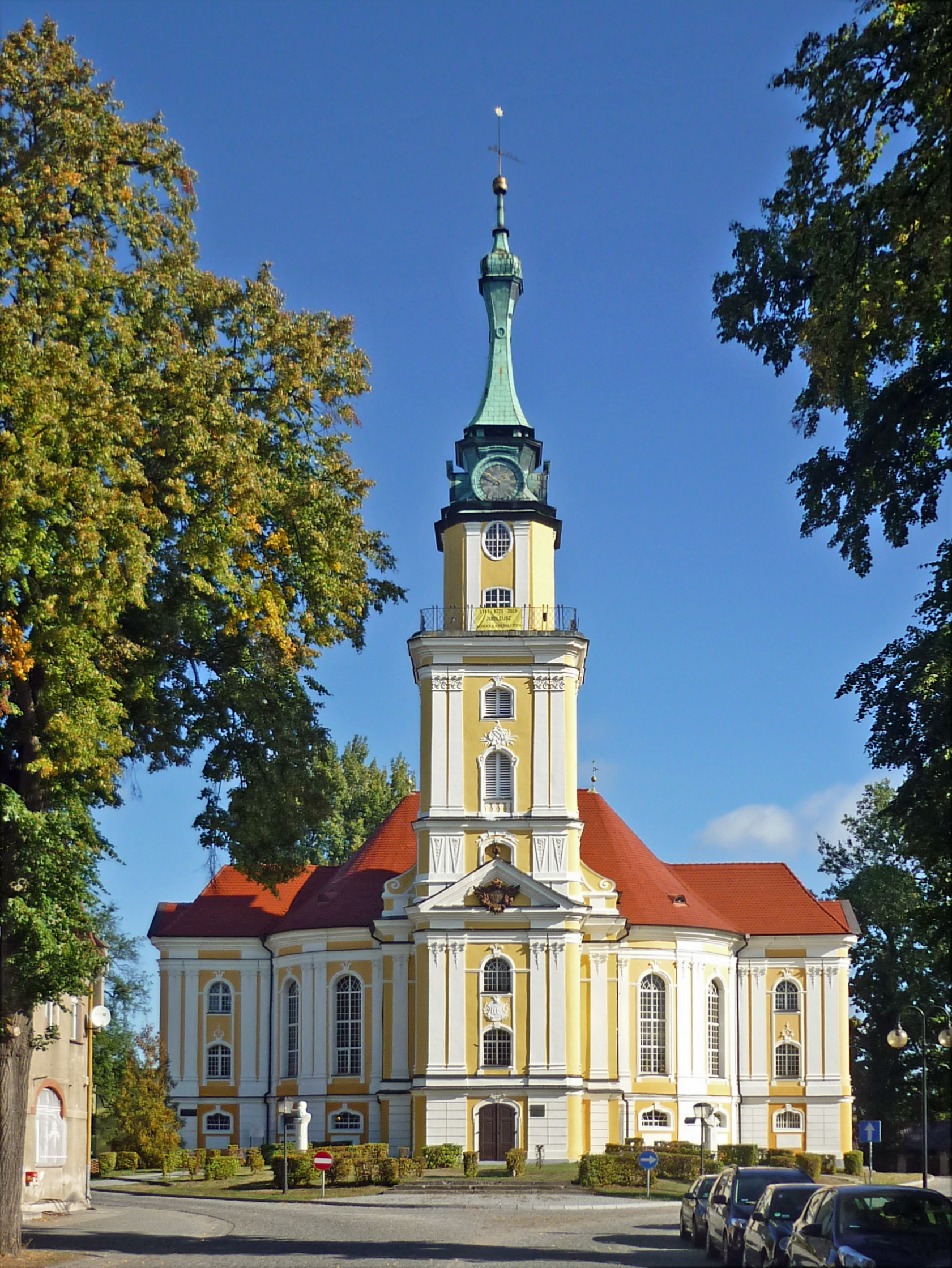
- Protestant church in Pokój

- Coat of arms

- Location within Poland
- Coordinates: 50°54′9″N 17°50′13″E
- Country: Poland
- Voivodeship: Opole
- County: Namysłów
- Gmina: Pokój

Population (2015)
  - Total: 1,452
- Time zone: UTC+1 (CET)
  - Summer (DST): UTC+2 (CEST)
- Postal code: 46–034
- Car plates: ONA
- Website: http://www.gminapokoj.pl

Pokój ([ˈpɔkui̯]; German: Bad Carlsruhe; Silesian: Pokōj) is a village in Namysłów County, Opole Voivodeship, in southern Poland. It is the seat of the gmina (administrative district) called Gmina Pokój.

== History ==
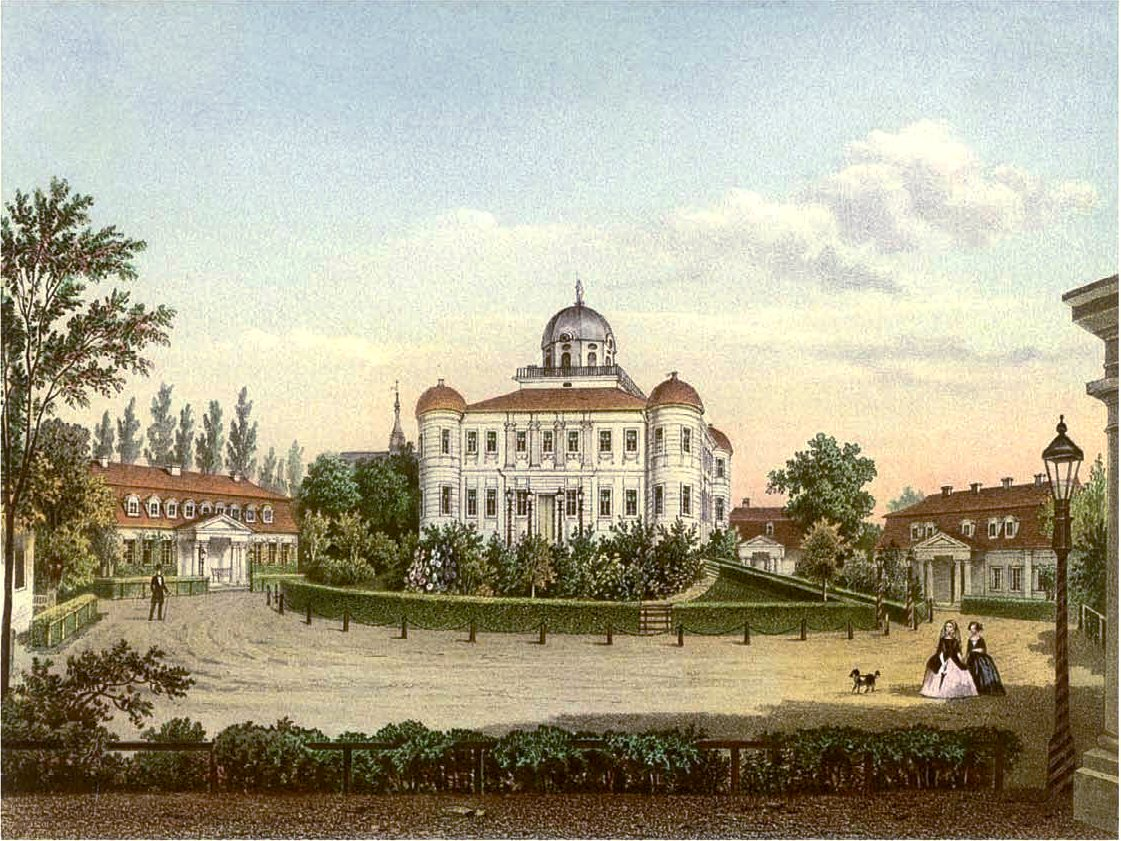
Mid-19th century view of the castle

The area became part of the emerging Polish state in the 10th century. Following the fragmentation of Poland into smaller provincial duchies, it formed part of the duchies of Silesia and Oleśnica. In 1742, it passed under the suzerainty of Prussia.

It was established in 1748 as a hunting lodge by Duke Charles Christian Erdmann, a scion of the House of Württemberg, whose ancestors had been enfeoffed with the Silesian Duchy of Oels (Oleśnica) in 1649. The adjacent settlement erected in 1763 with its streets radiating out from the ducal palace was modeled on and named after the Baden residence of Karlsruhe. The Polish name of the village was Pokój. When the Oels fiefdom fell to the Dukes of Brunswick-Wolfenbüttel in 1792, Charles Christian Erdmann's cousin Duke Eugen of Württemberg retained the town and palace of Carlsruhe as a fee tail. In the winter of 1806-07, he hosted the young composer Carl Maria von Weber, who wrote his two symphonies (Jähns 50/51) here. In 1842, the village had a population of 2,069. In the mid-19th century, the residents spoke mostly Polish and German. In 1847 Carlsruhe received the status of a spa town (Bad).

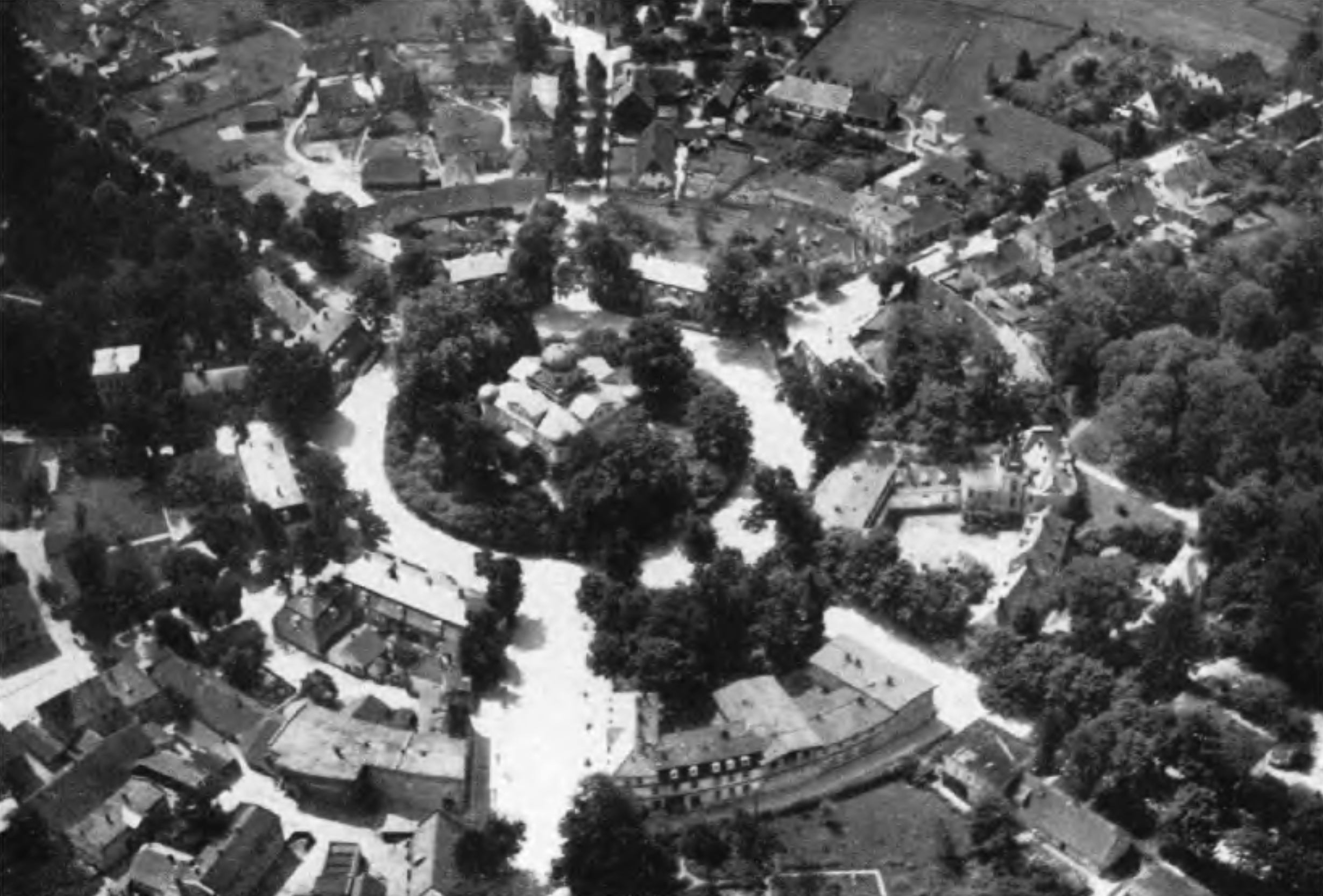
Aerial photograph of Pokój in 1930. The Castle is located in the centre of the shot.

In 1871 Carlsruhe together with the Prussian Province of Silesia was incorporated into the German Empire. Four annual fairs were held in the village in the late 19th century.

In the final stages of World War II, a German-organized death march of Allied prisoners of war from the Stalag Luft 7 POW camp stopped in the village on 20 January 1945, and the POWs slept in an abandoned brickyard. The village was heavily bombarded during the end of World War II following the Vistula–Oder Offensive of the Red Army, and the palace was destroyed. After the war, in 1945, the territory became again part of Poland. The Baroque Sophia's Church finished in 1775 is preserved, as is the extended English garden laid out by the Württemberg dukes. An annual Carl Maria von Weber festival is held to commemorate the composer's stay.

Pokój's coat of arms shows the Württemberg three black antlers on the right, and the Upper Silesian eagle of the Dukes of Opole on the left side.

== Notable people ==
- Duke Paul Wilhelm of Württemberg (1797–1860), explorer
- Duchess Maria Dorothea of Württemberg (1797–1855), Archduchess of Austria, Palatiness of Hungary
- Duke William of Württemberg (1828–1896), Austrian and Württemberg General
- Ferdinand von Richthofen (1833–1905), geographer
- Duke Nicholas of Württemberg (1833–1903), Austrian officer
- Duchess Agnes of Württemberg (1835–1886), German aristocrat
- Siegfried Translateur (1875–1944), composer
- Johannes Winkler (1897–1947), rocket pioneer
