= County of Isenburg =

Historical county of Germany

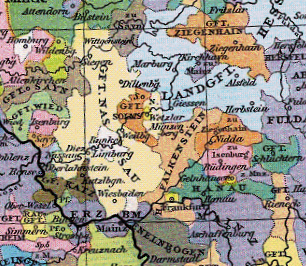
Isenburg (pink, right) and Lower Isenburg (pink, left) around 1400

The County of Isenburg was a region of Germany located in southern present-day Hesse, located in territories north and south of Frankfurt. The states of Isenburg emerged from the Niederlahngau (located in the Rhineland-Palatinate), which partitioned in 1137 into Isenburg-Isenburg and Isenburg-Limburg-Covern. These countships were partitioned between themselves many times over the next 700 years.

== House of Isenburg ==
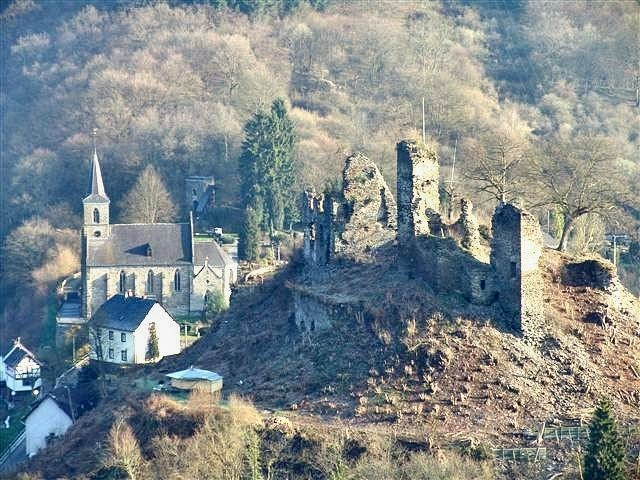
Ruins of the Castle at Isenburg (Lower Isenburg)

The House of Isenburg was an old aristocratic family of medieval Germany, named after the castle of Isenburg in Rhineland-Palatinate. Occasionally referred to as the House of Rommersdorf before the 12th century, the house originated in the Hessian comitatus of the Niederlahngau in the 10th century. It partitioned into the lines of Isenburg-Isenburg and Isenburg-Limburg-Covern in 1137, before partitioning again into smaller units, but by 1500 only the lines of Isenburg-Büdingen (in Upper Isenburg) and Lower Isenburg remained. In 1664 the Lower Isenburg branch died out. The Büdingen line continued to partition, and by the beginning of the 19th century the lines of Isenburg-Büdingen, Isenburg-Birstein, Isenburg-Meerholz and Isenburg-Wächtersbach existed.

== "Family tree" of the Isenburg countships ==
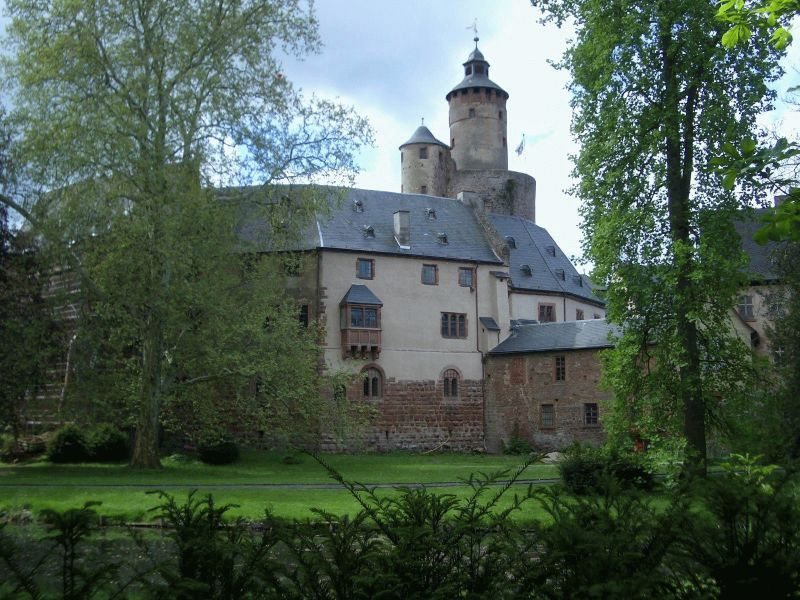
Büdingen Castle

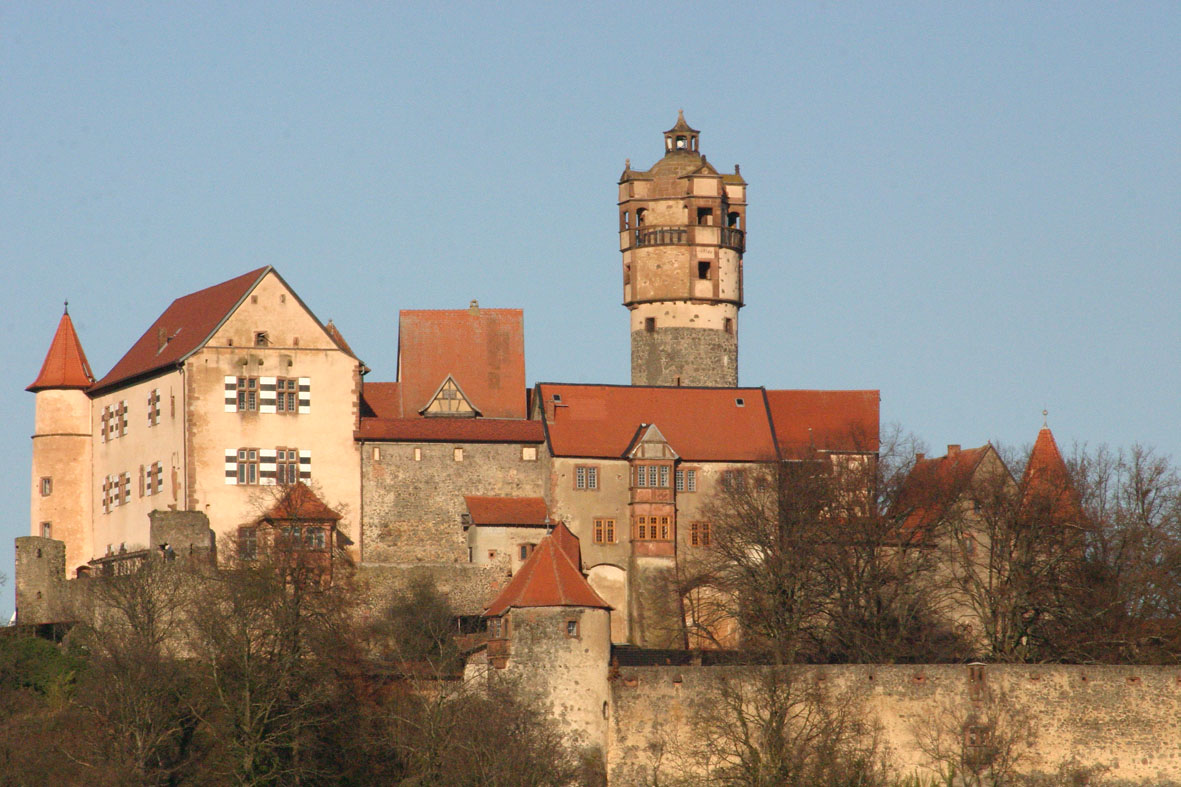
Castle Ronneburg, Hesse

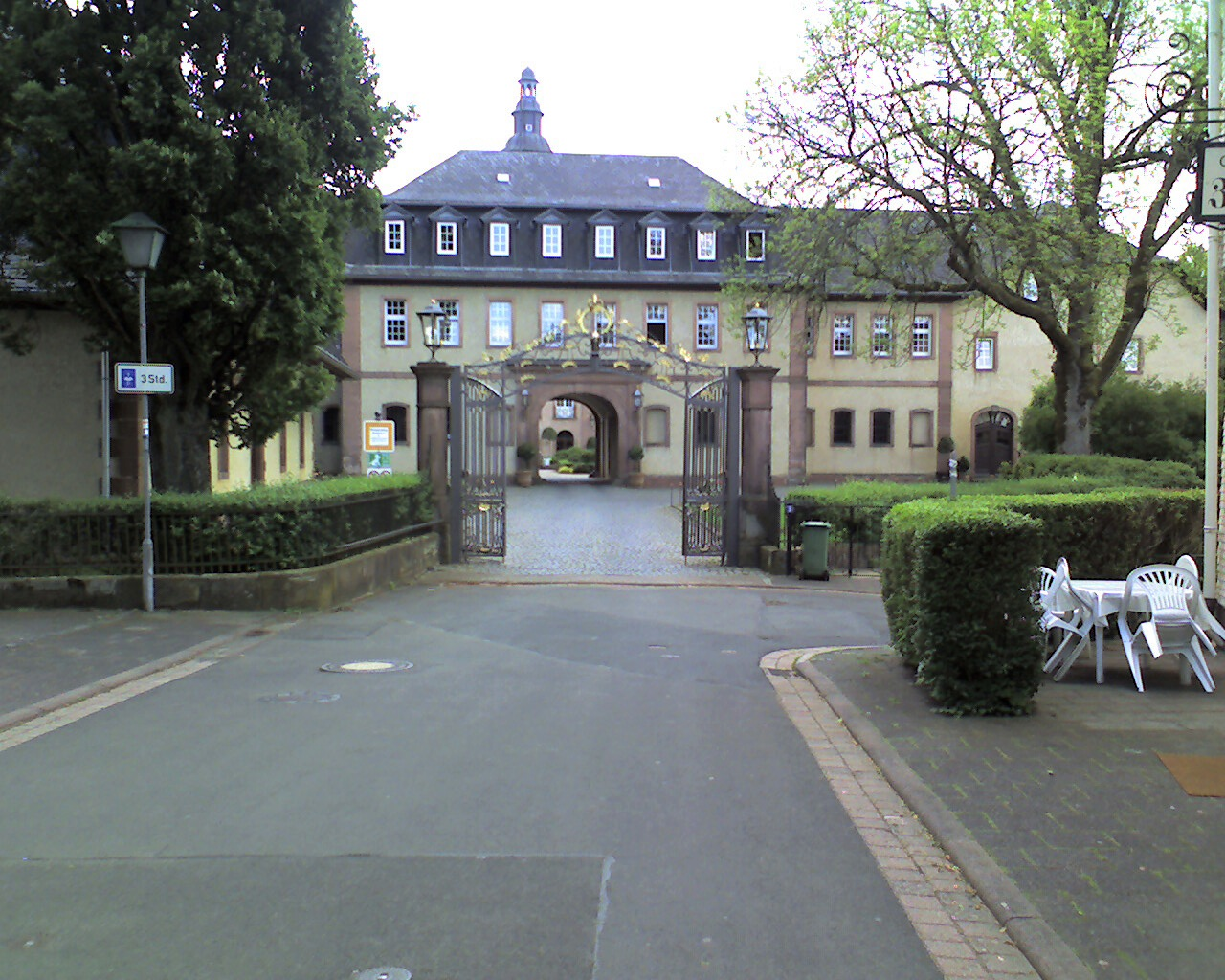
Birstein Castle

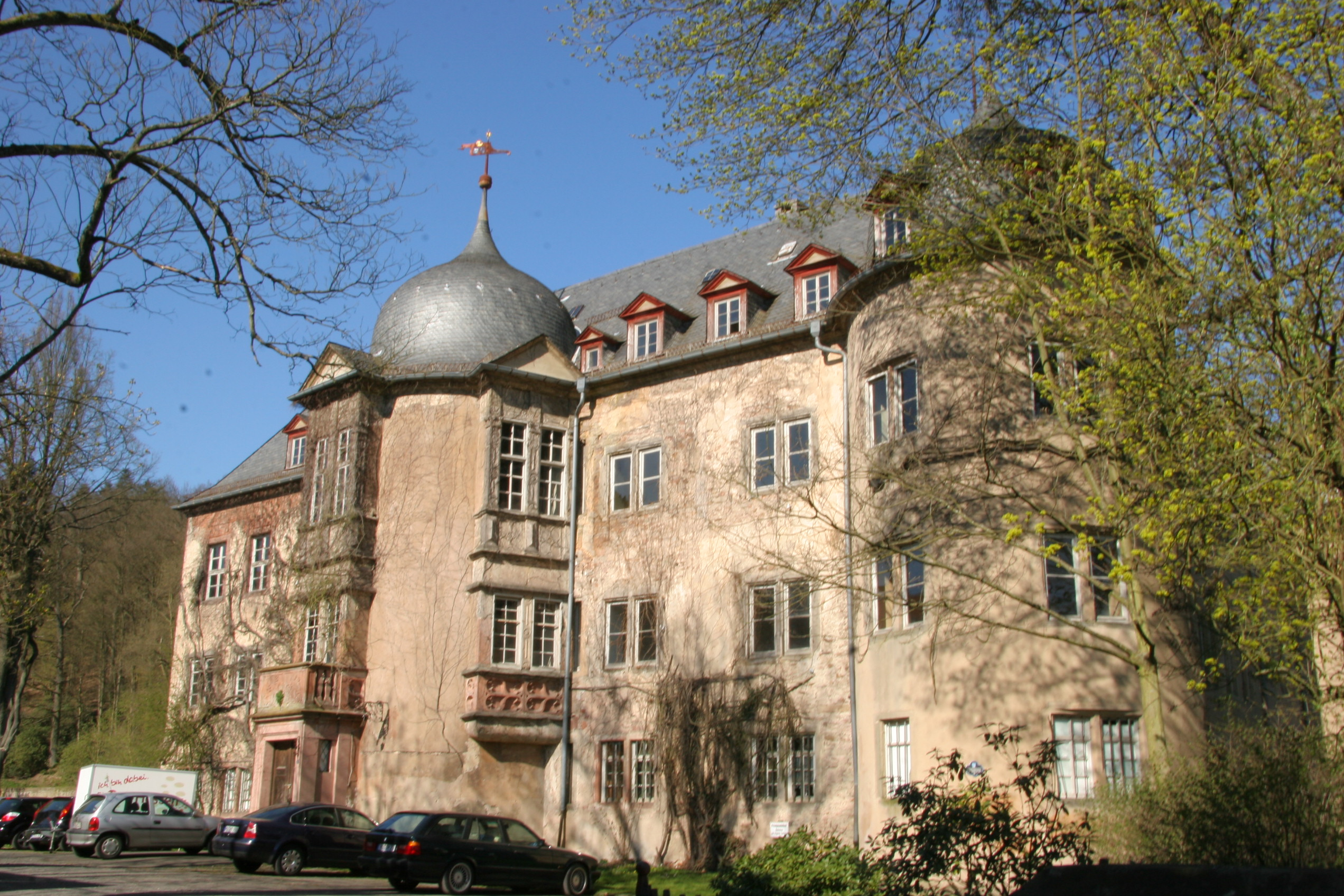
Wächtersbach Castle

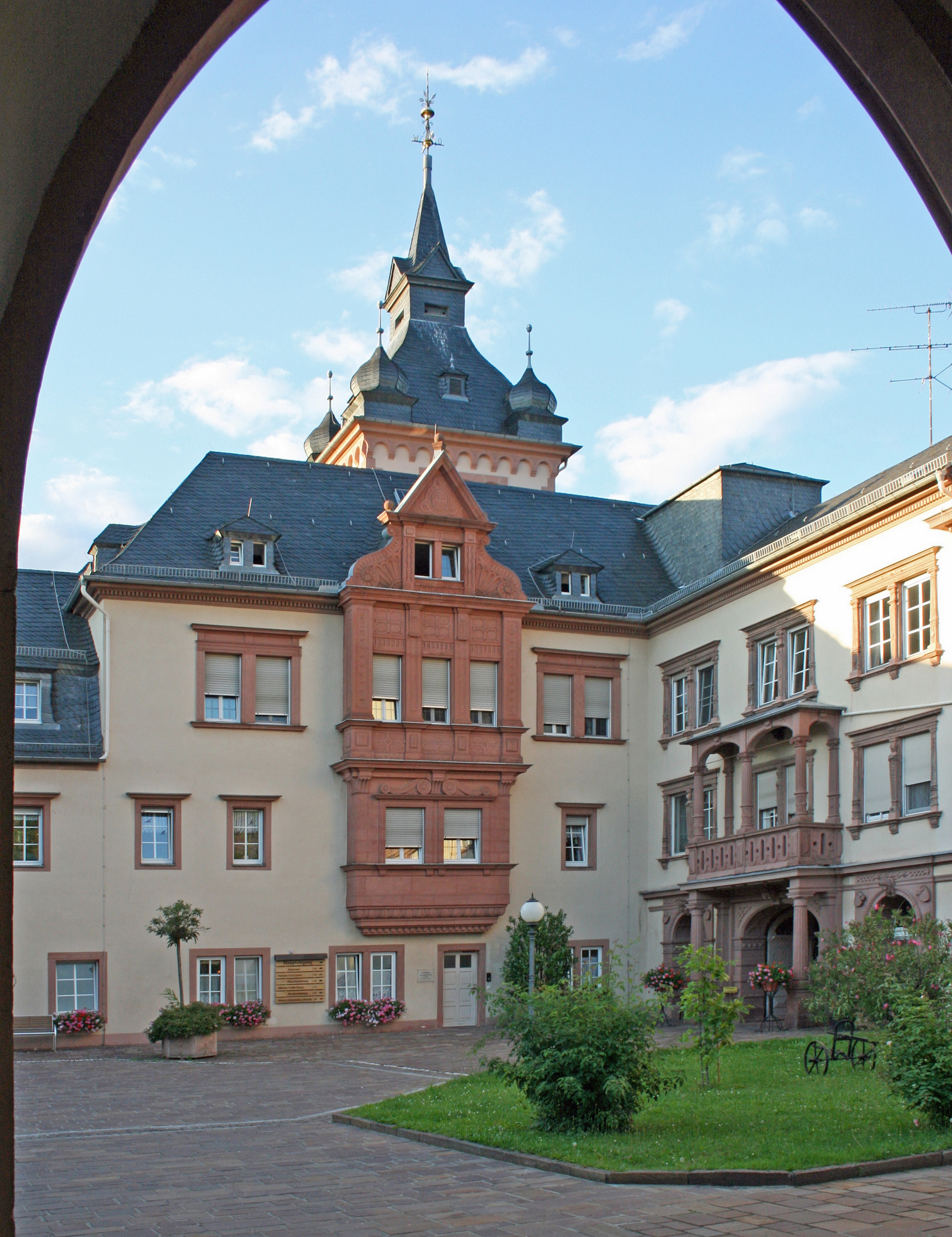
Meerholz Castle at Gelnhausen

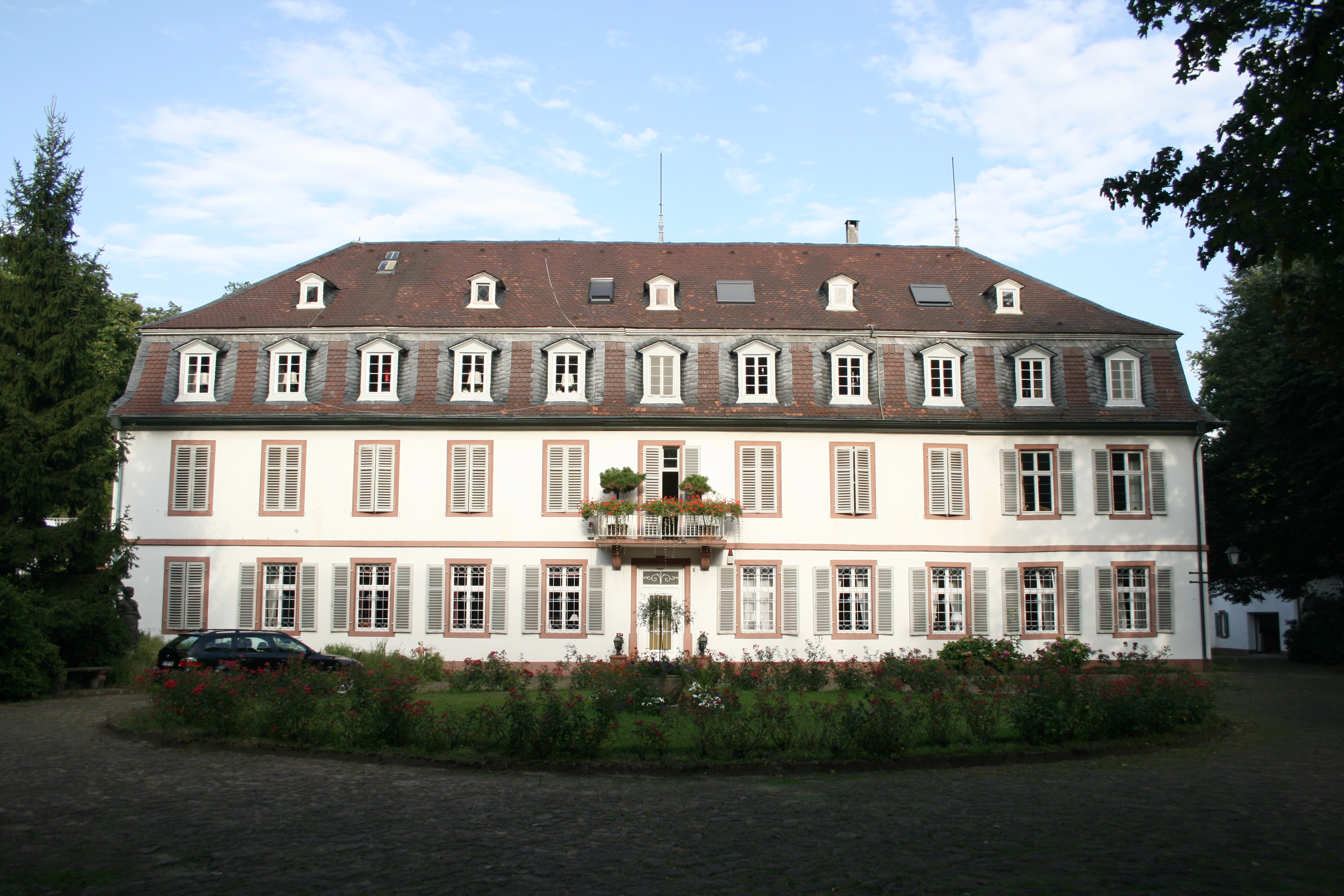
Philippseich Castle at Dreieich

Isenburg, the original countship was divided upon the death of Count Rembold II in 1137 into:

- Isenburg (or Isenburg-Isenburg), 1137–1199, eventually dividing c. 1210 into:
  - Isenburg-Braunsberg, 1210–1388, when it was renamed Isenburg-Wied. Isenburg-Wied, in turn, existed from 1388 to 1454, when it passed by marriage to the Lords of Runkel and was superseded by the Countship of Wied in 1462.
  - Nieder-Isenburg (Lower Isenburg), 1218–1502 when it was divided into:
    - Isenburg-Grenzau, 1502–1664. After the death of Count Ernest in 1664 without direct heirs, his territories were claimed back as feudal tenures by the Archbishoprics of Cologne and Trier, and the Abbey-principality of Fulda. The core territories including Isenburg were passed on by Fulda to the Counts of Walderdorff. They had to share them according to a later agreement with the Counts of Wied, by then a cadet branch of the Isenburgs.
    - Isenburg-Neumagen, 1502–1554, when it passed by marriage to the Counts of Sayn-Homburg.
- Isenburg-Kempenich, 1137–1424, when it passed to the Lords of Schöneck. In 1434, it passed to the Archbishop of Trier, who sold the territory to the Counts of Virneburg.
- Isenburg-Limburg-Covern, 1137–1158, when it was divided into:
  - Isenburg-Covern, 1158–1306, when it passed to Isenburg-Cleberg.
  - Isenburg-Grenzau, 1158–1258, when it was divided into:
    - Isenburg-Limburg, 1258–1406, when it was annexed by the Archbishopric of Trier
    - Isenburg-Grenzau, 1258–1287, when it was divided into:
      - Isenburg-Grenzau, 1287–1290, when it passed to Isenburg-Cleberg.
      - Isenburg-Arnfels, 1286–1379, when it passed to Isenburg-Wied.
      - Isenburg-Cleberg, 1287–1340, when it was divided into:
        - Isenburg-Grenzau, 1340–1439, when it passed to Nassau-Beilstein. It subsequently passed to the Archbishopric of Trier in 1446, and was finally purchased by the Counts of Nieder-Isenburg in 1460.
        - Isenburg-Büdingen, 1340–1511, when it was divided into:
          - Isenberg-Büdingen-Ronneburg, or Isenburg-Ronneburg, 1511–1601, when it was annexed by Isenburg-Büdingen-Birstein
          - Isenburg-Büdingen-Birstein (or Isenburg-Birstein), 1511–1628, which was divided into:
            - Isenburg-Birstein, 1628–1664, when it passed to Isenburg-Offenbach
            - Isenburg-Büdingen, 1628–1685, when it was divided into:
              - Isenburg-Büdingen, 1685–1806, when it was mediatized to the Principality of Isenburg
              - Isenburg-Wächtersbach, 1685–1806, when it was mediatized to the Principality of Isenburg
              - Isenburg-Meerholz, 1685–1806, when it was mediatized to the Principality of Isenburg
              - Isenburg-Marienborn, 1685–1725
            - Isenburg-Offenbach, 1628–1711, when it was divided into:
              - Isenburg-Birstein, 1711–1744, when it became the Principality of Isenburg-Birstein. The Principality existed from 1744 to 1806, when it was renamed the Principality of Isenburg, 1806–1814/5
              - Isenburg-Eisenberg, 1711–1758, when it was absorbed back into the Principality of Isenburg-Birstein
              - Isenburg-Philippseich, 1711–1806, when it was mediatized to the Principality of Isenburg

== Principality of Isenburg ==
Coat of Arms of the Principality of Isenburg

It was not until 1806 that there was a state called simply "Isenburg". When the Holy Roman Empire was defeated by Napoleon of France in that year, the empire was abolished and the Confederation of the Rhine was established amongst the various German states. As an incentive to join the Confederation, it was stated that any state which joined could mediatise their neighbours. Prince Charles of Isenburg-Birstein joined the Confederation and was granted the mediatized Isenburgian Countships of Isenburg-Büdingen, Isenburg-Meerholz, Isenburg-Philippseich, and Isenburg-Wächtersbach. His Principality was renamed to Isenburg.

The Principality continued under the rule of Prince Charles through the Napoleonic era, but was mediatised by Austria in December 1813, at the insistence of King Frederick William III of Prussia, who was angered that Isenburg had raised a regiment for French service by recruiting Prussian deserters and vagabonds. Isenburg was one of only three original member princes of the Empire to be mediatized at the end of the Napoleonic era (the others being Leyen and prince-primate Dalberg, Grand Duke of Frankfurt). This decision was confirmed at the Congress of Vienna. The lands of the principality were divided between the Grand Duchy of Hesse-Darmstadt and the Electorate of Hesse-Kassel (or Hesse-Cassel).

== Rulers ==
=== House of Isenburg ===
Partitions of Isenburg under Isenburg rule

County of Isenburg
(1041-1199)

County of
Kempenich
(1st creation)
(1137-1153)
County of Kobern
(1137-1306)
female-branch of Isenburg-Vianden from 1275

County of
Braunsberg
(1199-1388)
Renamed as:
County of
Wied
(1388-1462)

County of
Kempenich
(2nd creation)
(1199-1430)

County of
Lower Isenburg
(1218-1502)

County of
Limburg
(1227-1406)

County of Cleeberg
(1167-1340)
County of
Grenzau
(1st creation)
(1278-1292)
County of
Arenfels
(1278-1403)

County of
Grenzau
(2nd creation)
(1340-1439)

County of Büdingen
(1st creation)
(1340-1511)
Part of the
County of
Braunsberg
(1371-1388)
Renamed as:
County of
Wied
(1388-1462)
To
Archbishopric
of Trier
To Lords of
Schöneck
(1424-1434),
Archbishopric
of Trier
(1434)
and Counts of
Virneburg
(from 1434)
To Nassau-Beilstein
(1439-1446)
and Archbishopric
of Trier
(1446-1460)

To County of Wied
To County of Wied
County of
Neumagen
(1502-1563)

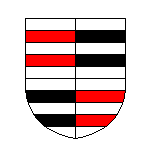

County of
Grenzau
(3rd creation)
(1502-1664)
County of Ronneburg
(1511-1601)
County of Birstein
(1st creation)
(1511-1664)
To County of Sayn-Homburg

County of Büdingen
(2nd creation)
(1628-1806)
(mediatized to Isenburg-Birstein in 1806)

To Archbishopric of Trier, Archbishopric of Cologne and Abbots of Fulda

County of Marienborn
(1673-1725)

County of Meerholz
(1673-1806)
(mediatized to Isenburg-Birstein in 1806)

County of Offenbach
(1628-1718)
County of Wachtersbach
(1673-1806)
(mediatized to Isenburg-Birstein in 1806)

County of Philippseich
(1711-1806)
(mediatized to Isenburg-Birstein in 1806)
County of Birstein
(2nd creation)
(1685-1744)
Raised to
Principality of Birstein
(1744-1806)

Principality of Isenburg
(Isenburg-Birstein line)
(1806-1815)
(mediatized to Austria in 1815
and Hesse in 1816)

Table of rulers

Ruler	Born	Reign	Ruling part	Consort	Death	Notes
Gerlach (I)	966	1002 – 1018	County of Lower Lahngau	Unknown at least two children	1018 aged 51–52	First known member of the family.
Rembold (I)	c.1010? Son of Gerlach (I)	1018 – 1072	County of Isenburg (?)	Unknown at least one child	1072 aged 61–62?	First known members of the family. They possibly held already the county of Isenburg
Gerlach (II)	c.1010? Son of Gerlach (I)	1018 – 1070	County of Isenburg (?)	Unmarried	c.1070 aged 59–60?	First known members of the family. They possibly held already the county of Isenburg
Rembold (II)	1058; Son of Rembold (I)	1072 – 1090	County of Isenburg (?)	Unknown at least two children	c.1090 aged 51–52	First known members of the family. They possibly held already the county of Isenburg
Gerlach I	c.1060 Son of Rembold (II)	1090 – 1115	County of Isenburg	Unknown at least two children	c.1115 aged 49–50	First members of the family firmly documented as Counts of Isenburg.
Rembold I	c.1060 Son of Rembold (II)	1090 – 1115	County of Isenburg	Unmarried	c.1115 aged 49–50	First members of the family firmly documented as Counts of Isenburg.
Rembold II	c.1080 First son of Gerlach I	1115 – 1137	County of Isenburg	Catharina of Arnstein five children	1137 aged 56–57	Brothers and co-rulers.
Gerlach II	c.1080 Second son of Gerlach I	1115 – 1120	County of Isenburg	Unmarried	c.1120 aged 39–40	Brothers and co-rulers.
Gerlach III	c.1110? First son of Rembold II and Catharina of Arnstein	1137 – 1158	County of Kobern	Jutta of Are three children	1158 aged 47–48?	Sons of Rembold II, divided their inheritance. Siegfried didn't have documented children, so his land may have returned to Isenburg. After the childless death of Rembold III, his nephew Rembold IV kept Isenburg-Isenburg.
Rembold III	c.1110? Second son of Rembold II and Catharina of Arnstein	1137 – 1162	County of Isenburg	Unmarried	1162 aged 51–52?	Sons of Rembold II, divided their inheritance. Siegfried didn't have documented children, so his land may have returned to Isenburg. After the childless death of Rembold III, his nephew Rembold IV kept Isenburg-Isenburg.
Siegfried	c.1110? Third son of Rembold II and Catharina of Arnstein	1137 – 1153	County of Kempenich	Justina of Kempenich no children	1153 aged 42–43?	Sons of Rembold II, divided their inheritance. Siegfried didn't have documented children, so his land may have returned to Isenburg. After the childless death of Rembold III, his nephew Rembold IV kept Isenburg-Isenburg.
Rembold IV	c.1130? First son of Gerlach III and Jutta of Are	1153-1175	County of Kempenich	Unknown two children	c.1175 aged 44–45?	Children of Gerlach III, divided their inheritance. Rembold inherited his childless uncles' possessions, while Gerlach inherited the property of their father.
Rembold IV	c.1130? First son of Gerlach III and Jutta of Are	1162-1175	County of Isenburg	Unknown two children	c.1175 aged 44–45?	Children of Gerlach III, divided their inheritance. Rembold inherited his childless uncles' possessions, while Gerlach inherited the property of their father.
Gerlach IV	c.1130? Second son of Gerlach III and Jutta of Are	1158 – 1167	County of Kobern	Unknown of Covern three children Unknown of Leiningen two children	1167 aged 36–37?	Children of Gerlach III, divided their inheritance. Rembold inherited his childless uncles' possessions, while Gerlach inherited the property of their father.
Gerlach V	c.1150? First son of Gerlach IV	1167 – 1217	County of Kobern	Unknown two children	1217 aged 66–67?	Children of Gerlach IV, divided their inheritance.
Henry I	c.1150? Second son of Gerlach IV	1167 – 1227	County of Cleeberg	Irmgard of Büdingen (d.c.1220) eight children	1227 aged 76–77?	Children of Gerlach IV, divided their inheritance.
Rembold V	c.1160? First son of Rembold IV	1175 – 1215	County of Kempenich	Hedwig, Lady of Kempenich two children	c.1215 aged 59–60?	Sons of Rembold IV, may have ruled jointly until 1199, when they made official the division of the inheritance.
Bruno I	c.1160? First son of Rembold IV	1175 – 1210	County of Braunsberg	Theodora of Wied (d.1218) four children	1210 aged 49–50?	Sons of Rembold IV, may have ruled jointly until 1199, when they made official the division of the inheritance.
Bruno II	1176; Son of Bruno I and Theodora of Wied	1210 – 1255	County of Braunsberg	Johanna two children	1255 aged 78–79?	
Salentin I	c.1190 First son ofRembold V and Hedwig of Kempenich	1215 – 1219	County of Lower Isenburg	Unknown at least one child	1219 aged 28–29	Children of Rembold V, divided their inheritance.
Theodoric I	c.1190 Second son ofRembold V and Hedwig of Kempenich	1215 – 1251	County of Kempenich	Judith of Blankenheim (d.1252) one child Adelaide (d.1258)two children	1251 aged 60–61?	Children of Rembold V, divided their inheritance.
Rosemann	c.1200? Third son ofRembold V and Hedwig of Kempenich	1215 – 1264	County of Kempenich	Kunigunda of Büdingen-Gelnhausen (d.c.1250) one child	1264 aged 63–64?	Children of Rembold V, divided their inheritance.
Gerlach VI	c.1170 First son of Gerlach V	1217 – 1235	County of Kobern	Judith (d. July 1253) two children	c.1235 aged 64–65	Sons of Gerlach V, possibly ruled jointly.
Henry I	c.1170 Second son of Gerlach V	1217 – 1235	County of Kobern	Unmarried	c.1235 aged 64–65	Sons of Gerlach V, possibly ruled jointly.
Henry II	c.1200? First son of Henry I and Irmgard of Büdingen	1220 – 29 September 1278	County of Cleeberg	Matilda of Hochstaden (d.1264); 1246 eight children	29 September 1278 aged 77–78?	Sons of Henry I, rule jointly until 1258, when they officially divided the land between them.
Gerlach I	c.1210? Second son of Henry I and Irmgard of Büdingen	1220 – January 1289	County of Limburg	Imagina of Blieskastel (1233-1281) five children	January 1289; Black Forest aged 78–79?	Sons of Henry I, rule jointly until 1258, when they officially divided the land between them.
Henry II	c.1210 Son of Gerlach VI and Judith	1235 – 1269	County of Kobern	Matilda c.1235 no children	1269 aged 58–59	Didn't have children, and the county passed to his sister.
Regency of Theodoric I, Count of Isenburg-Kempenich (1219-1224)						Like his uncle, regent and namesake in Lower Isenburg, he may have been also involved in the government of Kempenich.
Theodoric the Younger	c.1210? Son of Salentin I	1219 – 1273	County of Lower Isenburg	Judith of Merenberg (d.1263) four children	1273 aged 62–63?	Like his uncle, regent and namesake in Lower Isenburg, he may have been also involved in the government of Kempenich.
Bruno III	c.1210 Son of Bruno II and Johanna	1255 – 29 September 1278	County of Braunsberg	Sophia of Runkel (d. 26 March 1266) one child Isolda of Heinsberg (d.c.1290) c.1270 two children	29 September 1278 aged 67–68?	
Theodoric II	c.1240? Son of Theodoric I and Judith of Blankenheim	1264 – 1276	County of Kempenich	Unmarried	1276 aged 35–36?	Children of Theodoric II, possibly ruled jointly.
Gerhard I	c.1255 Son of Theodoric I and Adelaide	1264 – 1287	County of Kempenich	Beatrice (d.c.1275) four children	1287 aged 31–32?	Children of Theodoric II, possibly ruled jointly.
Cecilia	c.1210 Daughter of Gerlach VI and Judith	1269 – 1275	County of Kobern	Frederick of Vianden c.1225? at least one child	c. 1275 aged 64–65	Sister of Henry II, inherited Kobern.
Salentin II	c.1230? Son of Theodoric and Judith of Merenberg	1275 – 1297	County of Lower Isenburg	Agnes of Runkel (d.1316) ten children	1297 aged 66–67	
Frederick (II)	c.1230? Son of Frederick of Vianden and Cecilia	1275 – 1281	County of Kobern	Irmgard of Esch (1220-1292) c.1250 four children	1281 aged 46–47?	
Regency of Isolda of Heinsberg (c.1278-1284)						Associated his son Bruno to the county, but he predeceased him.
John I	c.1270 Son of Bruno III and Isolda of Heinsberg	29 September 1278 – 1327	County of Braunsberg	Agnes of Lower Isenburg (d.1316); 1294 seven children Margaret of Vickerode (d.1324) no children	1327 aged 56–57	Associated his son Bruno to the county, but he predeceased him.
Bruno IV	c.1305 Son of John I and Agnes of Lower Isenburg	c.1320 – 23 August 1325	County of Braunsberg	Heilwig of Katzenelnbogen (d.1346); 2 December 1312 four children	23 August 1325 aged 19–20	Associated his son Bruno to the county, but he predeceased him.
Louis	c.1250? First son of Henry II and Matilda of Hochstaden	29 September 1278 – 1304	County of Cleeberg	Heilwig of Tübingen-Giessen (d.c.1295) seven children	1304 aged 53–54	Sons of Henry II, divided the land between them. Eberhard left no heirs and his portion was inherited by his brother Louis.
Gerlach I	c.1250? Second son of Henry II and Matilda of Hochstaden	29 September 1278 – 1305	County of Arenfels	Elisabeth of Clèves (1236-1290) five children	c.1305 aged 54–55?	Sons of Henry II, divided the land between them. Eberhard left no heirs and his portion was inherited by his brother Louis.
Eberhard	c.1250? Third son of Henry II and Matilda of Hochstaden	29 September 1278 – 25 November 1292	County of Grenzau	Isolda of Heinsberg (d.c.1290) one child	25 November 1292 aged 41–42?	Sons of Henry II, divided the land between them. Eberhard left no heirs and his portion was inherited by his brother Louis.
Grenzau annexed to Cleberg
Robin	c.1250? Son of Frederick and Irmgard of Esch	1281 – 1306	County of Kobern	Elisabeth of Eppstein (d.1320); 26 May 1272; Kobern-Gondorf no children	1306 aged 55–56?	Left no descendants. After his death, Kobern was annexed to the County of Cleeberg.
Kobern annexed to Cleberg
Theodoric III	c.1270? First son of Gerhard I and Beatrice	1287 – 1325	County of Kempenich	Kunigunde of Solms (d.1344) two children	c.1325 aged 54–55	Sons of Gerard I, ruled jointly.
Simon I	c.1270? Second son of Gerhard I and Beatrice	1287 – 1320	County of Kempenich	Agnes of Trier; 1293 two children	c.1320 aged 49–50?	Sons of Gerard I, ruled jointly.
John I the Blind	1266; Son of Gerlach I and Imagina of Blieskastel	January 1289 – 19 September 1312	County of Limburg	Elisabeth of Geroldseck-Veldenz (1266-1285) two children Uda of Ravensberg; 25 August 1292 five children	19 September 1312 aged 45–46	
Salentin III	c.1280? Son of Salentin II and Agnes of Runkel	1297 –1351	County of Lower Isenburg	Catharina one child Matilda of Isenburg-Kobern (d.1350); 1304 six children	1351 aged 70–71?	
Lothar	c.1290 Son of Louis and Heilwig of Tübingen-Giessen	1304 – 4 February 1341	County of Cleeberg	Isengard of Falkenstein-Münzenberg; 1318 five children	4 February 1341 aged 50–51?	
Theodoric	c.1280? First son of Gerlach I and Elisabeth of Clèves	1305 – 1334	County of Arenfels (at Herschbach)	Hedwig of Neuenahr (d.c.1330); 14 August 1304 five children	1334 aged 53–54?	Sons of Gerlach I, divided their inheritance.
John	c.1280? Second son of Gerlach I and Elisabeth of Clèves	1305 – 17 November 1348	County of Arenfels (at Arenfels proper)	Catharina no children Jutta of Arscheid (d.c.1385) no children	17 November 1348 aged 67–68?	Sons of Gerlach I, divided their inheritance.
Gerlach II the Elder	c.1295 Son of John I and Uda of Ravensberg	19 September 1312 – 14 April 1355	County of Limburg	Agnes of Nassau-Siegen; 1312 three children Cunigunde of Wertheim; 20 December 1323 eight children	14 April 1355 aged 59–60	
Simon II	c.1290? First son of Theodoric III and Kunigunde of Solms	1325 – 1339	County of Kempenich	Catharina of Sayn (d.c.1345) one child	1339 aged 48–49?	Cousins, ruled jointly.
Theodoric IV the Arsonist	c.1290? Second son of Theodoric III and Kunigunde of Solms	1329 – 1341	County of Kempenich	Unmarried	1341 aged 50–51?	Cousins, ruled jointly.
Gerard II	c.1290 Son of Simon I and Agnes of Trier	1329 – 1335	County of Kempenich	Unmarried	c.1335 aged 44–45?	Cousins, ruled jointly.
William I	c.1315 Son of Bruno IV and Heilwig of Katzenelnbogen	1327 – 17 July 1383	County of Braunsberg	Agnes of Virneburg (d.1352/3); 1329 (annulled 12 September 1351) five children Johanna of Jülich (d.1362); 27 July 1354 one child Lysa, Countess of Isenburg-Arenfels; 11 November 1362 two children	17 July 1383 aged 67–68	Grandson of John I.
Simon III	c.1310? Son of Simon II and Catharina of Sayn	1341 – 1360	County of Kempenich	Hedwig of Schönberg (d.1367) six children	c.1360 aged 49–50?	
Henry I	1320; First son of Lothar and Isengard of Falkenstein-Münzenberg	4 February 1341 – 1379	County of Büdingen	Adelaide of Hanau; 29 July 1332 six children	1379 aged 58–59	Sons of Lothar, divided their inheritance.
Philip I	c.1320 Second son of Lothar and Isengard of Falkenstein-Münzenberg	4 February 1341 – 22 March 1370	County of Grenzau	Margaret of Katzenelnbogen (d.9 July 1370); 1338 two children	22 March 1370 aged 49–50	Sons of Lothar, divided their inheritance.
Gerlach II	c.1310? Son of Theodoric and Hedwig of Neuenahr	17 November 1348 – 14 August 1371	County of Arenfels	Elisabeth of Braunshorn (d.15 November 1339) six children Demut of Roesberg (d.c.1365) two children	14 August 1371 aged 60–61?	
Salentin IV	c.1320 Son of Salentin III and Matilda of Isenburg-Kobern	1351 – 1364	County of Lower Isenburg	Catharina of Solms-Sponheim; 25 February 1341 two children	1364 aged 43–44	
Gerlach III the Younger	c.1325 First son of Gerlach II and Cunigunde of Wertheim	14 April 1355 – April 1366	County of Limburg	Elizabeth of Falkenstein (d. 9 April 1366); 9 November 1356 no children	April 1366 aged 40–41	Died of Black Death, without male heirs.
Simon IV	c.1340? First son of Simon III and Hedwig of Schönberg	1360 – 1414	County of Kempenich	Unmarried	1414 aged 73–74?	Sons of Simon III, ruled jointly. The death of the last one of them with no male descendants led to the annexation of the land to the Lords of Schöneck.
Theodoric V	c.1340? Second son of Simon III and Hedwig of Schönberg	1360 – 1378	County of Kempenich	Unmarried	1378 aged 37–38?	Sons of Simon III, ruled jointly. The death of the last one of them with no male descendants led to the annexation of the land to the Lords of Schöneck.
John	c.1340? Third son of Simon III and Hedwig of Schönberg	1360 – 1424	County of Kempenich	Gertrude of Hückelhoven (d.1421) one child	1424 aged 37–38?	Sons of Simon III, ruled jointly. The death of the last one of them with no male descendants led to the annexation of the land to the Lords of Schöneck.
Henry	c.1340? Fourth son of Simon III and Hedwig of Schönberg	1360 – 1388	County of Kempenich	Elisabeth of Schönkeen no children	1388 aged 47–48?	Sons of Simon III, ruled jointly. The death of the last one of them with no male descendants led to the annexation of the land to the Lords of Schöneck.
Salentin V	c.1345 Son of Salentin IV and Catharina of Solms-Sponheim	1364 – 30 November 1420	County of Lower Isenburg	Adelaide, Countess of Isenburg-Arenfels; 6 May 1371 ten children	30 November 1420 aged 74–75	
John II	c.1330? Second son of Gerlach II and Cunigunde of Wertheim	April 1366 – 26 January 1406	County of Limburg	Hildegard of Saarwerden (d.1419) two children	26 January 1406 aged 75–76	Originally went into clergy. However, after his brother's death with no heirs, and with the permission of Pope Urban V, John put aside the office of Canon of Trier Cathedral and took over the rule of Limburg. He left no male heirs. The land went to the Archbishopric of Trier.
Isenburg-Limburg was annexed to the Archbishopric of Trier
Eberhard	1356; Son of Philip Iand Margaret of Katzenelnbogen	22 March 1370 – 1399	County of Grenzau	Matilda of the Mark (d.6 August 1406); 1371 five children	1399 aged 42–43	
Adelaide	c.1350? First daughter of Gerlach II and Demut of Roesberg	14 August 1371 – 1419	County of Arenfels	Salentin V, Count of Lower Isenburg; 6 May 1371 ten children	1419 aged 68–69?	Co-heiresses of Arenfels, their marriages determined the division of the county between their respective descendants.
Lysa	c.1350? Second daughter of Gerlach II and Demut of Roesberg	14 August 1371 – 30 November 1403	County of Arenfels	William I, Count of Isenburg-Braunsberg; 11 November 1362 two children	30 November 1403 aged 52–53?	Co-heiresses of Arenfels, their marriages determined the division of the county between their respective descendants.
Arenfels was divided between Braunsberg/Wied and Lower Isenburg
John I	1325; Son of Henry I and Adelaide of Hanau	1379 – 24 February 1395	County of Büdingen	Sophia of Wertheim (d.1389); 1355 two children	24 February 1395 aged 69–70	
William II	1352; Son of William I and Agnes of Virneburg	17 July 1383 – 1409	County of Braunsberg (until 1388) County of Wied (from 1388)	Unmarried	c.1409	Left no descendants.
John II	1360; Son of John I and Sophia of Wertheim	24 February 1395 – 1408	County of Büdingen	Margaret of Katzenelnbogen; 1385 two children	1408 aged 47–48	
Philip II	1376; Son of Eberhard and Matilda of the Mark	1399 – 1440	County of Grenzau	Catharina of Lower Isenburg (d.15 July 1441); 17 January 1395 no children	1440 aged 75–76	His childless death determined that the county was inherited by his nephews from Nassau-Beilstein, sons of his elder sister Matilda. In 1460, through his other sister Maria, her descendants would recover this county to Isenburg property.
Annexed to the County of Nassau-Beilstein (1439), to the Archbishopric of Trier (1446) and the County of Lower Isenburg (1460)
Diether	1390; Son of John II and Margaret of Katzenelnbogen	1408 – 20 November 1461	County of Büdingen	Elisabeth of Solms-Braunfels; 26 July 1409 eight children	20 November 1461 aged 70–71	
Gerlach	c.1365 Son of William I and Lysa, Countess of Isenburg-Arenfels	1409 – 1413	County of Wied	Agnes of Isenburg-Büdingen; 27 September 1376 four children	1413 aged 47–48	Half-brother of William II, ruled in Arenfels since 1403.
William III	c.1380? First son of Gerlach and Agnes of Isenburg-Büdingen	1413 – 22 October 1462	County of Wied (at Wied and 1/2 Arenfels)	Margaret of Moers no children Philippa of Heinsberg (d.14 January 1464); 10 April 1402 no children	22 October 1462 aged 81–82?	Sons of Gerlach, divided their inheritance. John left his inheritance to his daughter Anastasia, who married Dietrich IV, Lord of Runkel. After William's death, his part of the domain went to Dietrich IV, inheritor of the by then dead spouse's patrimony.
John II	c.1380? Second son of Gerlach and Agnes of Isenburg-Büdingen	1413 – 1454	County of Wied (at Braunsberg and 1/2 Arenfels)	Agnes of Westerburg (d.1415); 1400 two children Kunigunde of Westerburg (d. 2 February 1428); 1415 no children Kunigunde of Saffenberg (d.1454); 1428 no children	1454 aged 73–74?	Sons of Gerlach, divided their inheritance. John left his inheritance to his daughter Anastasia, who married Dietrich IV, Lord of Runkel. After William's death, his part of the domain went to Dietrich IV, inheritor of the by then dead spouse's patrimony.
Wied and 1/2 Arenfels annexed to the Runkel family
Salentin VI	c.1380? Son of Salentin V and Adelaide of Isenburg-Arenfels	30 November 1420 – 1458	County of Lower Isenburg	Adelaide of Isenburg-Grenzau no children Maria of Isenburg-Grenzau ten children	1458 aged 77–78?	
Hedwig	c.1405? Daughter of John and Gertrude of Hückelhoven	1424 – 1430	County of Kempenich	Peter of Schöneck; 1411 at least one child	c.1430 aged 24–25?	Heir of Kempenich, married the Lord of Schöneck, who eventually won the War of Succession that followed John's death in 1424.
Kempenich annexed to the Lordship of Schöneck (1424-1434), the Archbishopric of Trier (1434) and then to the County of Virneburg
Anastasia	c.1410 Daughter of John II and Agnes of Westerburg	1454 – 1460	County of Wied (at Braunsberg and 1/2 Arenfels)	Theodoric IV, Lord of Runkel; 1427 no children	1460 aged 49–50	Inherited her father's domains. After her death in 1460 the Runkel family inherited her part of the land, and the other would be inherited after her uncle William II's death.
Braunsberg and 1/2 Arenfels annexed to the Runkel family
Gerlach I	c.1410? Son of Salentin VI and Maria of Isenburg-Grenzau	1458 – 6 May 1488	County of Lower Isenburg	Jutta of Eppenstein (d.1451) four children	6 May 1488 aged 77–78?	
Louis II	1422; Son of Diether and Elisabeth of Solms-Braunfels	20 November 1461 – 4 June 1511	County of Büdingen	Maria of Nassau-Wiesbaden-Idstein; 1 December 1452 ten children	4 June 1511; Büdingen aged 88–89	
Gerlach II	c.1450 First son of Gerlach I and Jutta of Eppenstein	6 May 1488 – 18 July 1502	County of Lower Isenburg	Hildegard von Zirk (1430-1478) seven children	18 July 1502 aged 51–52	Sons of Gerlach II, ruled jointly.
James	1456; Third son of Gerlach I and Jutta of Eppenstein	6 May 1488 – 17 January 1505	County of Lower Isenburg	Unmarried	17 January 1505 aged 48–49	Sons of Gerlach II, ruled jointly.
Salentin VII	c.1470 First son of Gerlach II and Hildegard von Zirk	18 July 1502 – 24 September 1534	County of Neumagen	Elisabeth of Hunolstein-Neumagen (1475-4 June 1538) nine children	24 September 1534 aged 63–64	Children of Gerlach II, divided their inheritance after their uncle's death in 1505.
Gerlach III	c.1490 Second son of Gerlach II and Hildegard von Zirk	18 July 1502 – 9 September 1530	County of Grenzau	Anastasia of Moers (d.24 October 1557); 5 July 1494 eleven children	9 September 1530 aged 39–40	Children of Gerlach II, divided their inheritance after their uncle's death in 1505.
Philip I	20 March 1467; Büdingen; First son of Louis II and Maria of Nassau-Wiesbaden-Idstein	4 June 1511 – 22 February 1526	County of Ronneburg	Amalia of Rieneck; 19 November 1495; Büdingen six children	22 February 1526; Büdingen aged 58	Sons of Louis II, divided the county between them.
John III	1476; Büdingen; Third son of Louis II and Maria of Nassau-Wiesbaden-Idstein	4 June 1511 – 18 May 1533	County of Birstein	Anna of Schwarzburg-Blankenburg; 17 June 1516; Arnstadt seven children	18 May 1533; Büdingen aged 56–57	Sons of Louis II, divided the county between them.
Anton I	2 August 1501; Büdingen; Son of Philip I and Amalia of Rieneck	22 February 1526 – 25 October 1560	County of Ronneburg	Elisabeth of Wied; 19 October 1523; Wied sixteen children Katharina Gumpel (1530-18 September 1559); 16 February 1554 four children	25 October 1560; Büdingen aged 59	
Regency of Anastasia of Moers (1530-1535)						
Henry the Elder	5 January 1521; Son of Gerlach III and Anastasia of Moers	9 September 1530 – 1553	County of Grenzau	Margaret of Wertheim (d.25 March 1538); 2 September 1533 five children	1553 aged 31–32	
Reinhard	1518; Büdingen; First son of John III and Anna of Schwarzburg-Blankenburg	18 May 1533 – 28 February 1568	County of Birstein	Elisabeth of Waldeck-Wildungen; 1542 one child Margaret of Mansfeld (1520-1573); 4 May 1551; Rudolstadt no children	28 February 1568; Offenbach am Main aged 49–50	Sons of John III, ruled jointly.
Philip II	23 May 1526; Büdingen; Third son of John III and Anna of Schwarzburg-Blankenburg	18 May 1533 – 5 April 1596	County of Birstein	Irmengard of Solms-Braunfels; 31 October 1559; Birstein ten children	5 April 1596; Birstein aged 69	Sons of John III, ruled jointly.
Louis III	30 May 1529; Büdingen; Fourth son of John III and Anna of Schwarzburg-Blankenburg	18 May 1533 – 7 February 1588	County of Birstein	Anna Sybilla of Schwarzburg (25 October 1540 – 3 August 1578); 24 June 1571; Arnstadt four children Maria of Hohnstein (1558-2 February 1586); 13 August 1581; Offenbach am Main two children	7 February 1588; Offenbach am Main aged 58	Sons of John III, ruled jointly.
Salentin VIII	c.1520 Second son of Salentin VII and Elisabeth of Hunolstein-Neumagen	24 September 1534 – 1544	County of Neumagen	Unmarried	1544 aged 43–44	Sons of Salentin VII, ruled jointly. After their childless deaths, the county is inherited by their sister.
Henry	c.1534 Third son of Salentin VII and Elisabeth of Hunolstein-Neumagen	24 September 1534 – 13 February 1554	County of Neumagen	Antonia Penelope van Brederode (d.30 June 1591); 4 September 1547 ten children	13 February 1554 aged 53–54	Sons of Salentin VII, ruled jointly. After their childless deaths, the county is inherited by their sister.
John Henry	1534; Second son of Henry and Margaret of Wertheim	1553 – 15 November 1565	County of Grenzau	Erica of Manderscheid-Schleiden (d.23 December 1587); 22 August 1563; Grenzau no children	15 November 1565 aged 30–31	
Johannetta	c.1500 Daughter of Salentin VII and Elisabeth of Hunolstein-Neumagen	13 February 1554 – 8 August 1563	County of Neumagen	William I, Count of Sayn-Wittgenstein; 1522 seven children	8 August 1563 aged 53–54	
Neumagen annexed to the County of Sayn
George	10 September 1528; Ronneburg; Second son of Anton I and Elisabeth of Wied	25 October 1560 – 29 June 1577	Isenburg-Ronneburg (from 1566 in Ronneburg)	Barbara of Wertheim (1531-17 September 1600); 21 May 1552 no children	29 June 1577; Wertheim aged 48	Sons of Anton, divided their patrimony, Henry, the last surviving brother, reunited it, but left no descendants. After his death, Ronneburg was reabsorbed into Birstein.
Wolfgang	12 June 1533; Ronneburg; Third son of Anton I and Elisabeth of Wied	25 October 1560 – 20 December 1597	Isenburg-Ronneburg (from 1566 in Kelsterbach)	Johanna of Hanau-Lichtenberg; 26 October 1563 (annulled 1573) one child Ursula of Solms-Braunfels; 16 December 1577 no children Ursula of Gleichen-Remda (d. September 1625); 19 September 1585 no children	20 December 1597; Kelsterbach aged 64	Sons of Anton, divided their patrimony, Henry, the last surviving brother, reunited it, but left no descendants. After his death, Ronneburg was reabsorbed into Birstein.
Henry	13 September 1537; Ronneburg; Fifth son of Anton I and Elisabeth of Wied	25 October 1560 – 31 May 1601	Isenburg-Ronneburg (1566–1597 in Ronneburg; in the entire county from 1597)	Maria of Rappoltstein (5 July 1551 – 15 October 1571); 1569 no children Elisabeth of Gleichen-Tona (1554-19 July 1616); 1572 no children	31 May 1601; Ronneburg aged 63	Sons of Anton, divided their patrimony, Henry, the last surviving brother, reunited it, but left no descendants. After his death, Ronneburg was reabsorbed into Birstein.
Ronneburg was annexed to Birstein
Salentin IX	1532; First son of Henry and Margaret of Wertheim	15 November 1565 – 19 March 1610	County of Grenzau	Antonia Wilhelmina of Arenberg (1 March 1557 - 26 February 1626); 10 December 1577 two children	19 March 1610 aged 77–78	Originally Archbishop-Elector of Cologne, he abdicated of his post to inherit his childless brother's county.
Wolfgang Ernest I	29 December 1560; Birstein; Son of Philip II and Irmengard of Solms-Braunfels	5 April 1596 – 21 May 1633	County of Birstein	Anna of Gleichen-Remda; 26 September 1585; Birstein eight children Elisabeth of Nassau-Dillenburg; 16 April 1603; Frankfurt am Main one child Juliana of Sayn-Wittgenstein; 19 April 1616 four children Sabine von Saalfeld (d.1635) c.1630 (morganatic) no children	21 May 1633; Birstein aged 72	
Salentin X	c.1580 First son of Salentin IX and Antonia Wilhelmina of Arenberg	19 March 1610 – 5 December 1619	County of Grenzau	Unmarried	5 December 1619 aged 38–39	Died childless.
Ernest	1584; Second son of Salentin IX and Antonia Wilhelmina of Arenberg	5 December 1619 – 30 May 1664	County of Grenzau	Caroline Ernestine of Arenberg (6 September 1606 – 12 September 1630); 1 September 1625 no children Maria Anna of Hohenzollern-Hechingen (1614 – 7 March 1670); 1636; Fürstenberg one child	30 May 1664; Brussels aged 79–80	Left no male descendants.
Grenzau divided between the Archbishopric of Trier, Archbishopric of Cologne and Abbots of Fulda
Wolfgang Henry	21 October 1588; Offenbach; First son of Wolfgang Ernest I and Anna of Gleichen-Remda	21 May 1633 – 27 February 1638	County of Offenbach	Maria Magdalene of Nassau-Wiesbaden-Idstein; 12 September 1609; Büdingen thirteen children	27 February 1638; Frankfurt am Main aged 49	Sons of Wolfgang Ernest I, divided their inheritance. William Otto didn't have descendants and his feud was briefly annexed to Offenbach, before it generates a new branch in 1685.
William Otto	6 November 1597; Birstein; Fourth son of Wolfgang Ernest I and Anna of Gleichen-Remda	21 May 1633 – 17 July 1667	County of Birstein	Catharina Elisabeth of Hanau-Munzenberg (1 September 1607 – 24 September 1647); 7 November 1628 no children Anna Amalia of Nassau-Dillenburg; 24 October 1648; Birstein no children	17 July 1667; Birstein aged 69	Sons of Wolfgang Ernest I, divided their inheritance. William Otto didn't have descendants and his feud was briefly annexed to Offenbach, before it generates a new branch in 1685.
Council of Regency, in Büdingen only (1633-1643)						Sons of Wolfgang Ernest I, divided their inheritance. William Otto didn't have descendants and his feud was briefly annexed to Offenbach, before it generates a new branch in 1685.
John Ernest I	21 June 1625; Birstein; Son of Wolfgang Ernest I and Juliana of Sayn-Wittgenstein	21 May 1633 – 8 October 1673	County of Büdingen	Maria Charlotte of Erbach-Erbach; 15 June 1650; Wächtersbach twelve children	8 October 1673; Büdingen aged 48	Sons of Wolfgang Ernest I, divided their inheritance. William Otto didn't have descendants and his feud was briefly annexed to Offenbach, before it generates a new branch in 1685.
Isenburg-Birstein annexed to Isenburg-Offenbach
Regency of Maria Magdalene of Nassau-Wiesbaden-Idstein (1638-1640)						
John Louis	14 February 1622; Birstein; Son of Wolfgang Henry and Maria Magdalene of Nassau-Wiesbaden-Idstein	27 February 1638 – 23 February 1685	County of Offenbach	Maria Juliana of Hanau-Munzenberg (15 January 1617 – 28 October 1643); 7 October 1643; Hanau no children Louise of Nassau-Dillenburg; 10 February 1646; Dillenburg eleven children Maria Juliana Blingen (d.1677); 27 January 1666; Hanau (morganatic) six children	23 February 1685; Offenbach am Main aged 63	
Regency of Maria Charlotte of Erbach-Erbach (1673-1691)						Sons of John Ernest I, ruled under their mother during their minority, and then divided the land once more.
John Casimir	10 July 1660; Wächtersbach; Sixth son of John Ernest I and Maria Charlotte of Erbach-Erbach	8 October 1673 – 23 September 1693	County of Büdingen	Sophie Elisabeth of Isenburg-Offenbach; 12 April c.1680 Offenbach am Main eight children	23 September 1693; Culemborg aged 33	Sons of John Ernest I, ruled under their mother during their minority, and then divided the land once more.
Ferdinand Maximilian I	3 January 1662; Büdingen; Seventh son of John Ernest I and Maria Charlotte of Erbach-Erbach	8 October 1673 – 14 March 1703	County of Wächtersbach	Albertine Maria of Sayn-Berleburg (29 January 1663 – 29 November 1711); 1 July 1685; Berleburg fourteen children	14 March 1703; Wächtersbach aged 41	Sons of John Ernest I, ruled under their mother during their minority, and then divided the land once more.
George Albert	1 May 1664; Meerholz; Eighth son of John Ernest I and Maria Charlotte of Erbach-Erbach	8 October 1673 – 11 February 1724	County of Meerholz	Amalia Henriette of Sayn-Berleburg; 11 July 1691; Meerholz six children	11 February 1724; Meerholz aged 59	Sons of John Ernest I, ruled under their mother during their minority, and then divided the land once more.
Charles Augustus	27 January 1667; Büdingen; Eighth son of John Ernest I and Maria Charlotte of Erbach-Erbach	8 October 1673 – 16 March 1725	County of Marienborn	Anna Belgica Florentina of Solms-Laubach (9 September 1663 – 21 April 1707); 5 May 1690; Laubach four children	16 March 1725; Marienborn aged 59	Sons of John Ernest I, ruled under their mother during their minority, and then divided the land once more.
Marienborn was annexed to Wächtersbach
John Philip	3 December 1655; Offenbach am Main; Third son of John Louis and Louise of Nassau-Dillenburg	23 February 1685 – 21 September 1718	County of Offenbach	Charlotte Amalia of Palatinate-Zweibrücken-Landsberg (24 May 1653 – 9 August 1707)19 July 1678 no children Frederica Wilhelmina Charlotte of Sayn-Berleburg; 22 July 1708 one child	21 September 1718; Dreieich aged 63	Sons of John Louis, redivided their inheritance.
William Maurice I	3 August 1657; Offenbach am Main; Fourth son of John Louis and Louise of Nassau-Dillenburg	23 February 1685 – 8 March 1711	County of Birstein	Anna Amalia of Isenburg-Büdingen; 3 November 1679; Birstein sixteen children Anna Ernestina Sofia von Kvernheim (1660-30 September 1708); 1700 no children Wilhelmina Elizabeth of Leiningen-Dagsburg-Falkenburg (13 April 1659 – 15 September 1733); 1709; Niederweisel no children	8 March 1711; Birstein aged 54	Sons of John Louis, redivided their inheritance.
Council of Regency (1693-1701)						Died childless. He was succeeded by his brother.
John Ernest II	3 April 1683; Büdingen; Second son of John Casimir and Sophie Elisabeth of Isenburg-Offenbach	23 September 1693 – 31 May 1708	County of Büdingen	Unmarried	31 May 1708; Büdingen aged 25	Died childless. He was succeeded by his brother.
Regency of Albertine Maria of Sayn-Berleburg (1703-1710)						
Ferdinand Maximilian II	12 January 1692; Wächtersbach; Son of Ferdinand Maximilian I and Albertine Maria of Sayn-Berleburg	14 March 1703 – 22 April 1755	County of Wächtersbach	Albertine Ernestine of Isenburg-Büdingen (25 August 1692 – 11 June 1724); 28 May 1713; Büdingen nine children Ernestine Wilhelmine of Stolberg-Gedern; 7 December 1725; Wächtersbach eight children	22 April 1755; Wächtersbach aged 63	
Ernest Casimir I	12 May 1687; Büdingen; Fourth son of John Casimir and Sophie Elisabeth of Isenburg-Offenbach	31 May 1708 – 15 October 1749	County of Büdingen	Christine Eleonore of Stolberg-Gedern; 8 August 1708; Gedern eight children	15 October 1749; Büdingen aged 62	Brother of John Ernest II.
Wolfgang Ernest I	5 April 1666; Birstein; Third son of William Maurice I and Anna Amalia of Isenburg-Büdingen	8 March 1711 – 15 April 1754	County of Birstein	Friederike Elisabeth of Leiningen-Dagsburg-Hartenburg (16 January 1681 – 11 January 1717); 27 November 1707; Weilburg seven children Elisabeth Charlotte of Isenburg-Marienborn (7 November 1695 – 23 September 1723); 27 January 1719; Marienborn two children Charlotte Amalia of Isenburg-Meerholz; 22 May 1725 six children	15 April 1754; Birstein aged 88	Sons of William Maurice I, divided the land between them.
William Maurice II	23 July 1688; Birstein; Fourth son of William Maurice I and Anna Amalia of Isenburg-Büdingen	8 March 1711 – 7 March 1772	County of Philippseich	Amalia Louisa von Donna-Lauk-Reichertswalde (27 February 1763 – 20 April 1800); 3 January 1712; Birstein three children Philippine Louise of Stolberg-Gedern; 2 April 1725; Gedern twelve children	7 March 1772; Dreieich aged 84	Sons of William Maurice I, divided the land between them.
Charles	27 November 1700; Son of George Albert and Amalia Henriette of Sayn-Berleburg	11 February 1724 – 14 March 1774	County of Meerholz	Elisabeth Friederike Juliana of Solms-Rodelheim-Assenheim (23 September 1703 – 1 June 1762); 11 July 1691; Meerholz twelve children	14 March 1774 aged 73	
Louis Casimir	25 August 1710; Büdingen; Son of Ernest Casimir Iand Christine Eleonore of Stolberg-Gedern	15 October 1749 – 15 December 1775	County of Büdingen	Auguste Friederike of Stolberg-Wernigerode (4 September 1743 – 9 January 1783); 24 September 1768; Christinenhof eight children	15 December 1775; Büdingen aged 65	Left no surviving heirs. He was succeeded by his nephew.
Wolfgang Ernest II	17 November 1735; Birstein; Son of William Emicho Christoph of Isenburg-Birstein and Amalia Belgica of Isenburg-Marienborn	15 April 1754 – 3 February 1803	County of Birstein	Sophie Charlotte Ernestina of Anhalt-Bernburg-Schaumburg-Hoym; 20 September 1760; Schaumburg Castle seven children Ernestine Esperance Victoria of Reuss-Greiz (20 January 1756 – 2 December 1819); 20 August 1783 no children	3 February 1803; Offenbach am Main aged 68	Grandson of Wolfgang Ernest I.
Ferdinand Casimir I	19 January 1716; Wächtersbach; First son of Ferdinand Maximilian II and Albertine Ernestine of Isenburg-Büdingen	22 April 1755 – 16 September 1778	County of Wächtersbach	Augusta Caroline of Isenburg-Büdingen (15 July 1722 – 30 November 1758); 7 July 1750; Büdingen two children	16 September 1778; Assenheim aged 62	
Christian Charles	28 June 1732; Dreieich; Son of William Maurice II and Philippine Louise of Stolberg-Gedern	7 March 1772 – 26 March 1779	County of Philippseich	Constance Sophie of Sayn-Berleburg; 13 June 1762; Dreieich seven children	26 March 1779; Dreieich aged 46	
John Frederick William	2 May 1729; Meerholz; Son of Charles and Elisabeth Friederike Juliana of Solms-Rodelheim-Assenheim	14 March 1774 – 4 May 1802	County of Meerholz	Caroline of Salm (20 April 1734 – 11 May 1791); 11 June 1762; Grumbach eight children	4 May 1802; Meerholz aged 73	
Ernest Casimir II	25 February 1757; Büdingen; Son ofErnest Dietrich of Isenburg-Büdingen and Dorothea Wilhelmina of Isenburg-Birstein	15 December 1775 – 25 February 1801	County of Büdingen	Eleonore of Bentheim-Steinfurt (26 April 1754 – 18 February 1827); 25 July 1779; Burgsteinfurt eight children	25 February 1801; Büdingen aged 44	Nephew of Louis Casimir.
Ferdinand Casimir II	17 October 1752; Wächtersbach; Son of Ferdinand Casimir I and Augusta Caroline of Isenburg-Büdingen	16 September 1778 – 1 December 1780	County of Wächtersbach	Auguste Louise Clementine Hedwig of Bentheim-Steinfurt (23 September 1755 – 15 November 1798); 29 April 1755; Siegen no children	1 December 1780; Wächtersbach aged 28	Left no heirs. The county passed to his uncle.
Council of Regency (1779-1781)						Left no heirs.
Charles William Ernest	20 October 1767; Dreieich; Second son of Christian Charles and Constance Sophie of Sayn-Berleburg	26 March 1779 – 30 January 1781	County of Philippseich	Unmarried	30 January 1781; Dreieich aged 14	Left no heirs.
Albert Augustus	14 April 1717; Wächtersbach; Second son of Ferdinand Maximilian II and Albertine Ernestine of Isenburg-Büdingen	1 December 1780 – 25 November 1782	County of Wächtersbach	Sophia Dorothea Wilhelmina van Rehren (15 June 1706 – 23 October 1758); 22 April 1756; Almelo no children Charlotte of Hesse-Barchfeld; 9 June 1765; Meiningen no children	25 November 1782; Wächtersbach aged 65	Didn't have children. He was succeeded by his brother.
Council of Regency (1781-1788)						Brother of Charles William Ernest. In 1806, by German mediatisation, all Isenburg lands were absorbed into Isenburg-Birstein.
Henry Ferdinand	15 October 1770; Dreieich; Third son of Christian Charles and Constance Sophie of Sayn-Berleburg	30 January 1781 – 12 July 1806	County of Philippseich	Amalia Isabella Sidonia of Bentheim-Tecklenburg; 13 July 1789; Lemgo nine children	27 December 1838; Wächtersbach aged 68	Brother of Charles William Ernest. In 1806, by German mediatisation, all Isenburg lands were absorbed into Isenburg-Birstein.
Isenburg-Philippseich absorbed into Isenburg-Birstein
William Reinhard	5 May 1719; Wächtersbach; Third son of Ferdinand Maximilian II and Albertine Ernestine of Isenburg-Büdingen	25 November 1782 – 5 August 1785	County of Wächtersbach	Auguste Louise Clementine Hedwig of Bentheim-Steinfurt (23 September 1755 – 15 November 1798); 20 February 1784; Wächtersbach no children	5 August 1785; Wächtersbach aged 66	Brother of Ferdinand Casimir I and Albert Augustus. Married his sister-in-law, but didn't have heirs.
Adolph I	20 August 1722; Wächtersbach; Fourth son of Ferdinand Maximilian II and Albertine Ernestine of Isenburg-Büdingen	5 August 1785 – 19 April 1798	County of Wächtersbach	Unmarried	19 April 1798; Wächtersbach aged 75	Brother of Ferdinand Casimir, Albert Augustus and William Reinhard. He also didn't have heirs.
Louis Maximilian I	28 August 1741; Wächtersbach; Son of Ferdinand Maximilian II and Ernestine Wilhelmine of Stolberg-Gedern	19 April 1798 – 23 June 1805	County of Wächtersbach	Auguste of Sayn-Wittgenstein-Hohenstein (27 February 1763 – 20 April 1800); 26 April 1789; Wittgenstein four children	23 June 1805; Wächtersbach aged 64	Last son of Ferdinand Maximilian II.
Ernest Casimir III	20 January 1781; Büdingen; Son of Ernest Casimir II and Eleonore of Bentheim-Steinfurt	25 February 1801 – 12 July 1806	County of Büdingen	Ferdinande of Erbach-Schönberg (23 July 1784 – 24 September 1848); 10 May 1804; Zwingenberg eight children	1 December 1852; Büdingen aged 71	In 1806, by German mediatisation, all Isenburg lands were absorbed into Isenburg-Birstein.
Isenburg-Büdingen absorbed into Isenburg-Birstein
Charles William Louis	7 May 1763; Meerholz; Son of John Frederick William and Caroline of Salm	4 May 1802 – 12 July 1806	County of Meerholz	Caroline of Sayn-Wittgenstein-Hohenstein (13 September 1764 – 28 April 1833); 29 March 1785; Wittgenstein six children	17 April 1832; Meerholz aged 68	In 1806, by German mediatisation, all Isenburg lands were absorbed into Isenburg-Birstein.
Meerholz absorbed into Birstein
Regency of Charles, Count of Isenburg-Birstein (1805-1806)						In 1806, by German mediatisation, all Isenburg lands were absorbed into Isenburg-Birstein.
Louis Maximilian II	21 May 1791; Wächtersbach; Son of Louis Maximilian I and Auguste of Sayn-Wittgenstein-Hohenstein	23 June 1805 – 12 July 1806	County of Wächtersbach	Unmarried	25 February 1821; Wächtersbach aged 29	In 1806, by German mediatisation, all Isenburg lands were absorbed into Isenburg-Birstein.
Wachtersbach absorbed into Birstein
Charles	29 June 1766; Birstein; Son of Wolfgang Ernest IIand Sophie Charlotte Ernestina of Anhalt-Bernburg-Schaumburg-Hoym	3 February 1803 – 12 July 1806	Principality of Birstein	Charlotte Auguste of Erbach-Erbach; 16 September 1795; Erbach six children	21 March 1820; Birstein aged 53	In 1806, in the advent of the German mediatization, his county was chosen as the one to which all the others were absorbed to. He was then raised as Prince of Isenburg. However, in 1815, his own Principality was also absorbed, firstly to Austria, and then to the Electorate of Hesse.
Charles	29 June 1766; Birstein; Son of Wolfgang Ernest IIand Sophie Charlotte Ernestina of Anhalt-Bernburg-Schaumburg-Hoym	12 July 1806 – 8 June 1815	Principality of Isenburg	Charlotte Auguste of Erbach-Erbach; 16 September 1795; Erbach six children	21 March 1820; Birstein aged 53	In 1806, in the advent of the German mediatization, his county was chosen as the one to which all the others were absorbed to. He was then raised as Prince of Isenburg. However, in 1815, his own Principality was also absorbed, firstly to Austria, and then to the Electorate of Hesse.
Isenburg was annexed to Austria (1815-16) and to the Electorate of Hesse (from 1816)
