= William Maurice II of Isenburg-Philippseich =

German Prince and Monarch (1688–1772)

William Maurice II

Count of Isenburg-Philippseich
- Reign: 8 March 1711 – 7 March 1772
- Coronation: 8 March 1712
- Predecessor: William Maurice I (as ruler of Isenburg-Birstein)
- Successor: Christian Charles, Count of Isenburg-Philippseich
- Regent: None
- Born: 23 July 1688; Isenburg-Philippseich, Holy Roman Empire
- Died: 7 March 1772 (aged 83); Isenburg-Philippseich, Holy Roman Empire
- Burial: 1772
- Spouse: Burgravine Amalie Luise of Dohna-Lauck; Philippa Luise of Stolberg-Gedern
- Issue: See below
- House: Isenburg
- Father: William Maurice I of Isenburg-Philippseich
- Mother: Anna Amalie of Isenburg and Büdingen
- Religion: Catholic Christianity

William Maurice II of Isenburg-Philippseich (German: Wilhelm Moritz II von Isenburg-Philippseich); (23 July 1688 – 7 March 1772) was a lieutenant General of the Electorate of Palatinate and the first ruler of the County of Isenburg-Philippseich.

== Life ==
William Maurice II of Isenburg-Philippseich was the son of William Maurice I, Count of Isenburg-Büdingen-Birstein (1657–1711) and his wife, Countess Anna Amalie of Isenburg and Büdingen (1653-1700), the eldest daughter of Count Johann Ernst I of Isenburg-Büdingen (1625-1673).

== Marriage and issues ==
On his first marriage on 9 January 1712, William Maurice II married in Birstein to Burgravine Amalie Luise of Dohna-Lauck (1680–1723), daughter of Count Christoph Friedrich of Dohna-Lauck (1652-1734) and his wife, Countess Johanna Elisabeth of Lippe-Detmold (1653-1690). From their marriage came the following issue:

- Countess Johanna Elisabeth Amalie (1720–1780), who married to Count George Charles Augustus Louis I of Leiningen-Westerburg-Neuleiningen (1717-1787)
- Countess Friederike Christiane Sophie (1721–1772) who married to Count Louis Ferdinand of Sayn-Wittgenstein-Berleburg (1712-1773)

After Amalie's death, William Maurice married on 2 April 1725 in Gedern to Countess Philippa Luise of Stolberg-Gedern (1705–1744), daughter of Count Louis Christian of Stolberg-Gedern (1652-1710) and his wife, Duchess Christine von Mecklenburg-Güstrow (1663-1749). From this marriage they had the following issue:

- Countess Christiane Wilhelmine (1726–1765)
- Count Ludwig Moritz (1727–1750)
- Count Johann Adolph (1728–1757)
- Countess Luise (1731–1813), married Blasius Columban, Baron von Bender
- Count Christian Charles (1732–1779) who became the next ruling Count; married firstly to Countess Constanze of Sayn-Wittgenstein-Berleburg (1733-1776) and had issue; married secondly to her sister, Countess Ernestine Eleonore of Sayn-Wittgenstein-Berleburg (1731-1791) and no issue from his second marriage
- Count Gustav Ernst (1733–1749)
- Countess Christine Eleonore (1737–1752)
- Countess Christiane Ferdinande (1740–1822)
- Count George Augustus of Isenburg-Philippseich (1741–1822); married morganatically to Theresa Burkart (1755-1817); had issue
- Philippine Sophie Ernestine (1744–1819)

== Reign ==
William Maurice embarked on a military career and became a major general in the Upper Rhenish Circle. In the Imperial Army he held the rank of Field Marshal Sergeant General and eventually became Lieutenant General Field Marshal. He ended his military career as a general lieutenant in the Palatinate. As an inheritance of the Offenbach line, he received the villages of Götzenhain, Offenthal,Sprendlingen, Urberach and Münster in the Dreieich. Afterwards, the county of Isenburg-Philippseich came into being in 1711, of which he was the first ruler. He later died on 7 March 1772 at the age of 87 after a reign of over 60 years
