= Wolfgang Ernst I of Isenburg-Büdingen-Birstein =

German nobleman

Wolfgang Ernst I, Count of Isenburg-Büdingen
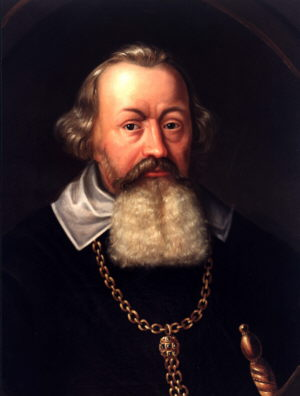
- Born: 29 December 1560; Birstein
- Died: 21 May 1633 (aged 72); Birstein
- Noble family: Isenburg-Büdingen
- Spouses: Countess Anna of Gleichen-Rhemda; Countess Elisabeth of Nassau-Dillenburg; Countess Juliane of Sayn-Wittgenstein; Sabine von Salfeld (morganatic)
- Father: Philipp II, Count of Isenburg-Büdingen in Birstein
- Mother: Countess Irmengard of Solms-Braunfels

Wolfgang Ernst I, Count of Isenburg-Büdingen (Birstein, 29 December 1560 – Birstein, 21 May 1633) was a German count of the House of Isenburg. He was count of Isenburg-Birstein from 1596 to 1633, after violently seizing power from Henry of Isenburg-Rönneburg.

== Early life ==
Wolfgang was the son of Philipp II, Count of Isenburg-Büdingen und Birstein (1526-1596) and his wife, Countess Irmengard of Solms-Braunfels (1536-1577). Through his mother he was first cousin once removed of Amalia of Solms-Braunfels, Princess consort of Orange and first cousin of Johannetta of Sayn-Wittgenstein sister-in-law of William the Silent.

== Family and children ==
He married four times and had several children, who inherited his land after his death.

First, he was married on 26 September 1585 with Countess Anna of Gleichen-Rhemda (1565–1598) who bore him the following children:

- Wolfgang Henry, Count of Isenburg-Büdingen-Birstein (1588–1635) line of Isenburg-Büdingen-Birstein
- Countess Anna Amalie of Isenburg-Büdingen-Birstein (1591–1667), married Arnold Jost of Bentheim-Bentheim (1580-1643), son of Arnold III, Count of Bentheim-Steinfurt-Tecklenburg-Limburg
- Count Philipp Ludwig of Isenburg-Büdingen-Birstein (1593–1616) (in a duel)
- Count Philipp Ernst of Isenburg-Büdingen-Birstein (1595–1635)
- Count Wilhelm Otto of Isenburg-Büdingen-Birstein (1597–1667)

Secondly, he married on 16 April 1603 with Countess Elisabeth of Nassau-Dillenburg (1564–1611) a daughter of Johann VI, Count of Nassau-Dillenburg and widow of Philip IV, Count of Nassau-Weilburg but the marriage was childless.

Thirdly, he married on 19 April 1616 with Countess Juliane of Sayn-Wittgenstein (1583–1627) a daughter of Louis I, Count of Sayn-Wittgenstein (1532–1605) from his second marriage with Countess Elisabeth of Solms-Laubach (1549-1599) who bore him one son:

- Johann Ernst, Count of Isenburg-Büdingen-Büdingen (1625–1673) line of Isenburg-Büdingen

On 24 Jun 1628 he married for a fourth time, this time morganatically to Sabine von Saalfeld (d. 1635).

== Ancestry ==
Ancestors of Wolfgang Ernst I of Isenburg-Büdingen-Birstein

8. Louis II, Count of Isenburg-Büdingen
4. Johann, Count of Isenburg-Büdingen-Birstein
9. Countess Maria of Nassau-Wiesbaden-Idstein
2. Philipp II, Count of Isenburg-Büdingen-Birstein
10. Günther XXXIX, Count of Schwarzburg-Blankenburg
5. Countess Anna of Schwarzburg-Blankenburg
11. Countess Amalie of Mansfeld
1. Wolfgang Ernst I, Count of Isenburg-Büdingen-Birstein
12. Bernard III, Count of Solms-Braunfels
6. Count Philipp of Solms-Braunfels
13. Countess Margareta of Henneberg
3. Countess Irmengard of Solms-Braunfels
14. Otto V, Count of Tecklenburg
7. Countess Anna of Tecklenburg
15. Countess Irmgard of Rietberg
