= Ferdinand Casimir II of Isenburg-Wächtersbach =

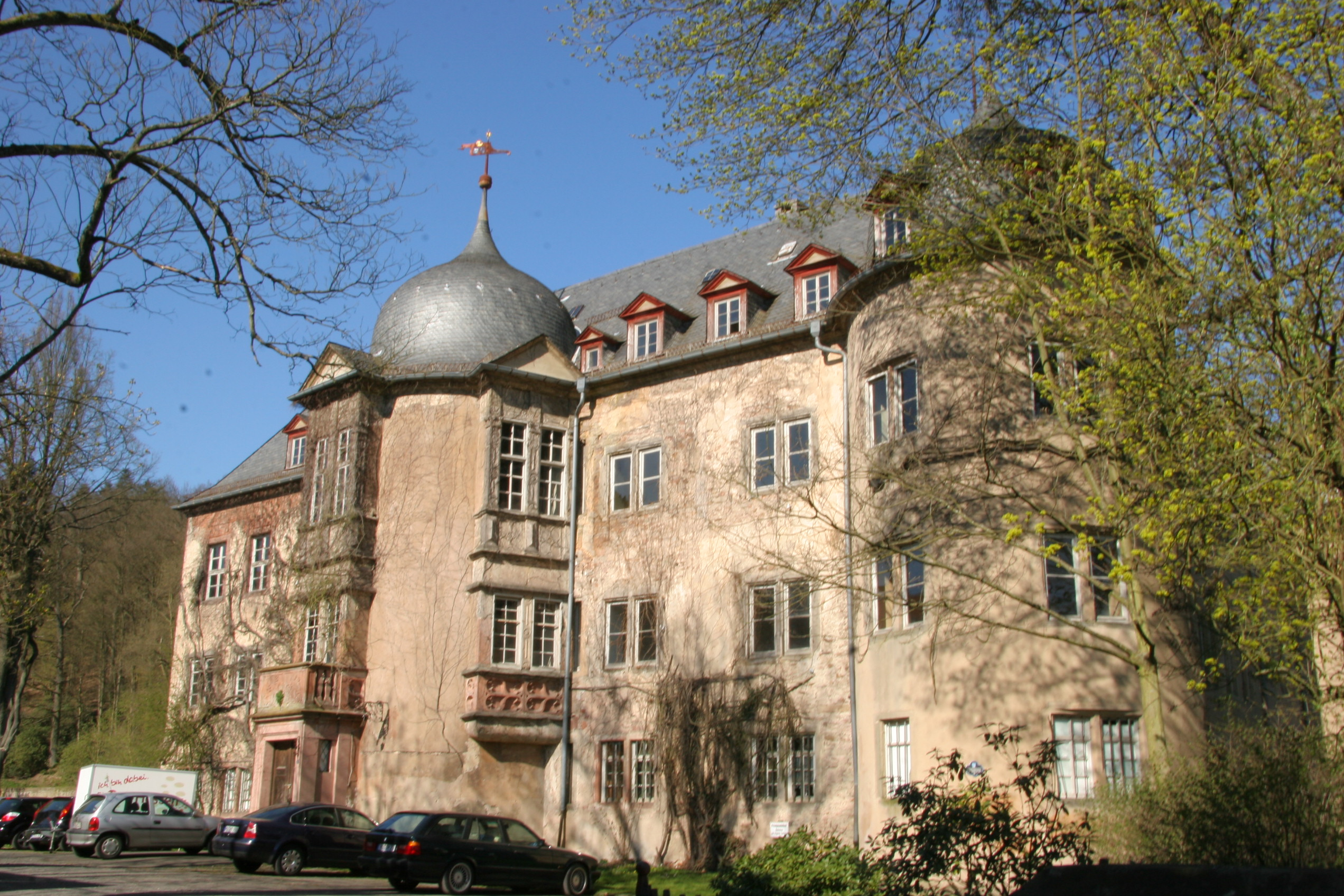

Ferdinand Casimir II of Isenburg-Wächtersbach was a German count of Isenburg-Wächtersbach, and the son of Ferdinand Casimir I of Isenburg-Wächtersbach. His countship lasted from 1778 until 1780, and the county itself lasted from 1673 to 1806 in the central Holy Roman Empire, until it was mediatised to Isenburg.
