= Dietrich V =

Dietrich V may refer to:

- Dietrich V, Count of Cleves (ruled 1201–1260)
- Theodoric V of Isenburg-Kempenich (co-Lord in 1329–1330)
