= Dietrich IV =

Dietrich IV may refer to:

- Dietrich IV, Count of Cleves (ruled 1188–1198)
- Theodoric IV of Isenburg-Kempenich (ruled until 1329)
