= John Louis of Isenburg-Offenbach =

- Born: 14 February 1622
- Died: 23 February 1685 (aged 63)
- Occupation: Count of Isenburg-Offenbach

John Louis of Isenburg-Offenbach (German: Johann Ludwig von Isenburg-Offenbach, 14 February 1622 — 23 February 1685) was the Count of Isenburg-Offenbach from 1635 until 1685, and the co-Count of Isenburg-Birstein from 1641 until 1685.

He was the second son of Wolfgang Henry, and inherited his title because his elder brother was deceased. He assumed government in 1644 in his own name, after the conclusion of a treaty between Landgrave George II of Hesse-Darmstadt and the Counts of Isenburg-Büdingen.

John Louis married Louise, daughter of Louis Henry, Prince of Nassau-Dillenburg, on 10 February 1646. They had five children:

- Sophie Elizabeth (1650 — 1692)
- Charlotte Amalie (1651 — 1725)
- Johann Philipp (1655 — 1718), count of Isenburg-Offenbach
- Wilhelm Moritz (1657 — 1711), count of Isenburg-Birstein
- Christiane (1660 — 1710)

He lived in a castle in Offenbach and was buried in the chapel there.

John Louis of Isenburg-Offenbach House of Isenburg Born: 14 February 1622 Died: 23 February 1685
Preceded by Wolfgang Henry	Count of Isenburg-Offenbach; 1635 - 1685	Succeeded by John Philip
Preceded by Christian Maurice	Count of Isenburg-Birstein; 1641 - 1685	Succeeded by William Maurice
