= William Reinhard of Isenburg-Wächtersbach =

German nobleman

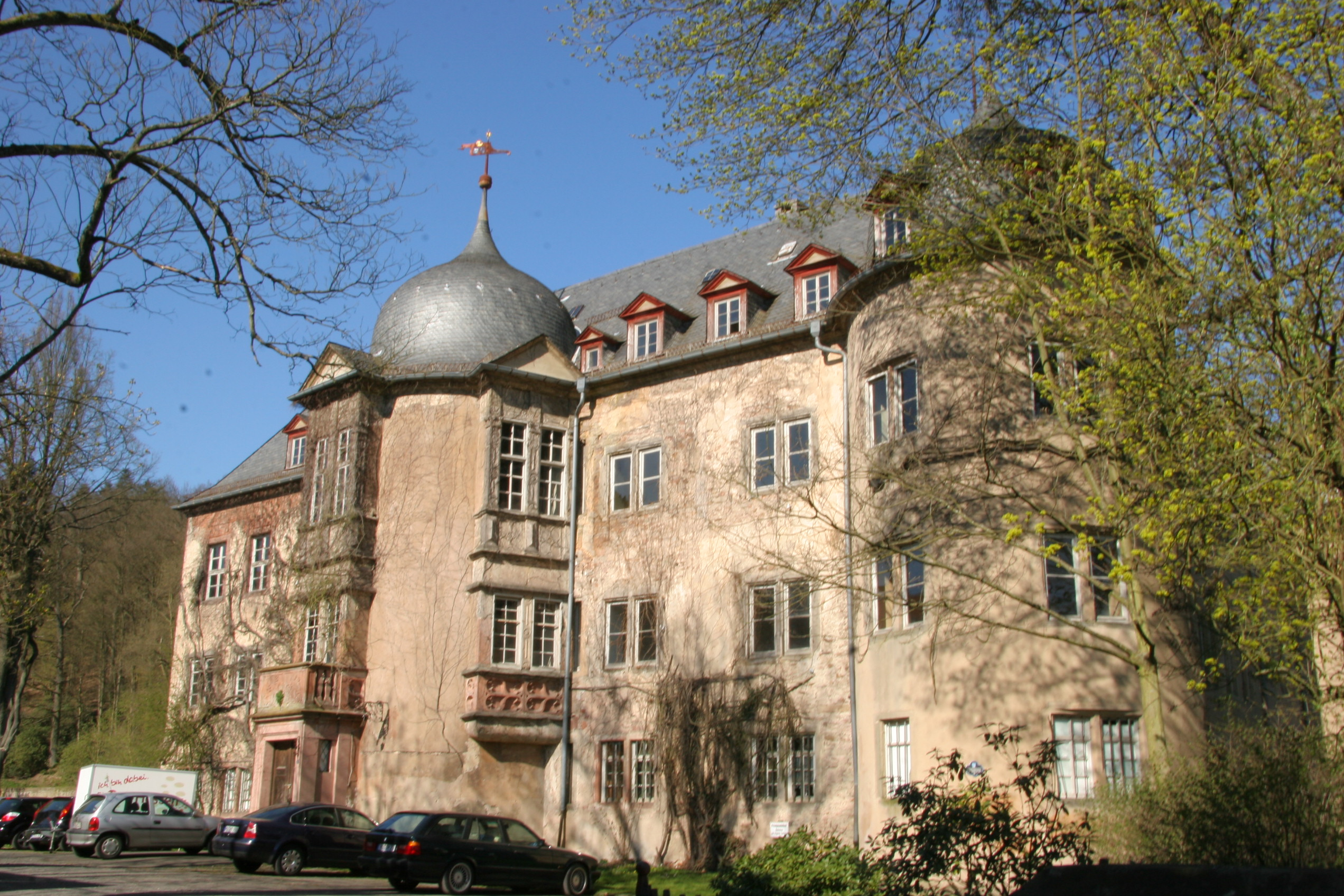
Schloss Wächtersbach

William Reinhard of Isenburg-Wächtersbach was a German count of Isenburg-Wächtersbach from 1782 to 1785. The county itself lasted from 1673 to 1806 in the central Holy Roman Empire, until it was mediated to Isenburg.
