= Blasius Columban, Baron von Bender =

Luxembourgish politician

Blasius Columban Baron von Bender
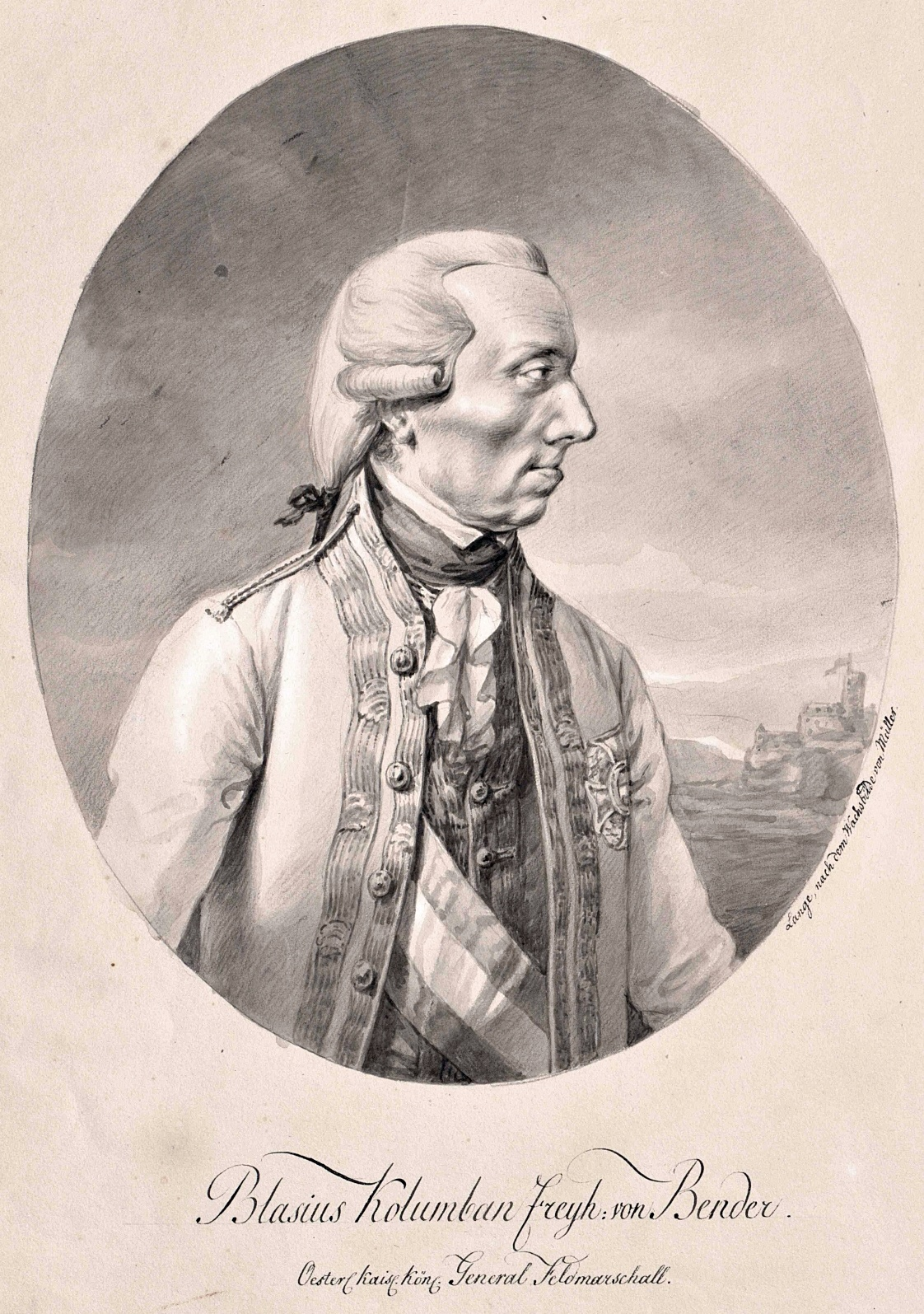
- Austrian Field Marshal Blasius Columban, Baron von Bender
- Born: November 14, 1713; Gengenbach
- Died: 20 September or 20 November 1798; Prague
- Military career
- Allegiance: Holy Roman Empire
- Branch: Imperial Army
- Service years: 1733-1793
- Rank: Field Marshal
- Conflicts: Russo-Turkish War (1735–1739); Seven Years' War; Brabant Revolution; War of the First Coalition

Blaise Colomban Bender or (after his ennoblement in 1782) Blaise Colomban, Baron von Bender (German - Blasius Columban Freiherr von Bender; 14 November 1713 – 20 September or 20 November 1798) was an officer for over sixty years in the Imperial Army or Kaiserliche Armee, the force directly recruited by the Holy Roman Emperor without the need for permission from the Imperial Diet. (This was distinct from the official Army of the Holy Roman Empire or Reichsheer, recruited by the Diet itself), whose archaic mode of recruitment in the many Circles of the Empire led to its losing its importance and the Imperial Army becoming the Empire's most effective field force.) In his long career he fought in twenty-nine campaigns, twelve major battles and six sieges.

== Life ==
He was born in Gengenbach in the Black Forest into a middle-class family - his father was army officer Johannes Casper Bender, son of Johannes Bender and Anne Marie Hetzler from Villingen, whilst Blasius' mother was Marie Eva Leutgardis Jüngling, daughter of Columban Jüngling and Anne Marguerite Bach from Ehrstein. Gengenbach was then in the Margravate of Baden and an imperial city of the Swabian Circle. Blasius first entered the Imperial Army in 1733, fighting against the Ottoman Empire under Prince Eugene of Savoy. Next he took part in wars both within and outside the Empire, including the pacification of Silesia and the Netherlands and the Seven Years' War. He was seriously wounded at Mollwitz, Prague, Striegau and Trautenau.

He married three times, though his first wife's name is unknown. His second wife was Johanna Catharina Michael von Gutenthal (d. 1772). In 1758 he was made 'Oberst' (colonel), followed by major general eleven years later. On 14 January 1774, aged 61, he married his last wife, Countess Louise zu Isenburg-Philippseich (1731-1813), younger daughter of general field marshal Count William Maurice II of Isenburg-Philippseich by his second wife, Countess Philippa Luise of Stolberg-Gedern (1705–1744).

In 1782 Joseph II, Holy Roman Emperor ennobled him and his four nephews as barons of the Holy Roman Empire and from 1783 onwards he lived in a new hôtel facing the Parc de Bruxelles - he had had it designed in the neoclassical style and it consisted of his residence and two separate houses. It was remodelled for William I of the Netherlands to designs by Ghislain-Joseph Henry in 1818, twenty years after Bender's death, adding an arcaded gallery linking it to the hôtel de Belgiojoso and thus forming the nucleus of the future Royal Palace of Brussels.

In 1785 Bender was made military commander of Luxembourg and when the Brabant Revolution broke out four years later he was ordered to put it down, since he was already in command of the troops stationed in Luxembourg. In 1790 he was made a field marshal, his final rank, and in November that year he set out from Luxembourg to Brussels with 30,000 men. He managed to recapture Brussels from the rebels, before pacifying the whole Austrian Netherlands in a few weeks, allowing governor-general Albert Casimir, Duke of Teschen to resume his role. As a reward Bender was made a Grand Cross of the Military Order of Maria Theresa.

Despite being aged 82 by that point, he took an active part in the War of the First Coalition, defending Luxembourg City for eight months against the advancing forces of Revolutionary France until the city's surrender on 1 June 1795. He died in Prague.

== Iconography ==
- Engraved portrait of Blaise Colomban de Bender, captioned Blaise Colomban de Bender : baron du St Empire Romain, grand-croix de l'Ordre royal et militaire de Marie Thérese, maréchal des armées, colonel propriétaire d'un régiment d'infanterie, au service de l'Empereur et Roi et commandant général du corps d'armée aux Pays-Bas &.a &.a &.a.
