= John II of Isenburg-Wied =

Count of Isenburg-Wied (died 1454)

John II of Isenburg-Wied (d. 1454, German: Johann II. von Isenburg-Wied) was the co- Count of Isenburg-Wied from 1415 until 1454. He married Agnes of Westerburg (d. before 1415), with whom he had a daughter, Anastasia (m. 1427, Dietrich IV, lord of Runkel). He married again c. 1415, Kunigunde von Westerburg, with whom he had no children.

Preceded by:	John II	Succeeded by:
William III	Count of Isenburg-Wied; 1415–1454 with... William III	William III
