= Ferdinand Casimir I of Isenburg-Wächtersbach =

Ferdinand Casimir I of Isenburg-Wächtersbach was a German count of Isenburg-Wächtersbach from years 1755 to 1778, and was the son of Ferdinand Maximilian II of Isenburg-Wächtersbach. The county lasted from 1673 to 1806, until it was mediated to Isenburg.
