= Nieder-Isenburg =

Mediaeval county in Germany

County of Lower Isenburg Grafschaft Nieder-Isenburg
- 1218–1664
- Coat of arms
- Status: County
- Capital: Isenburg
- Common languages: Moselle Franconian
- Historical era: Middle Ages
  - Isenburg first mentionend: 983
  - Emerged from County of Isenburg-Isenburg: 1218
  - Partitioned into Isenburg-Grenzau and Isenburg-Neumagen: 1503
  - Isenburg-Neumagen to County of Sayn-Wittgenstein: 1554
  - Isenburg-Grenzau line extinct: 1664
Preceded by
Isenburg-Isenburg
Succeeded by
Electorate of Cologne
Electorate of Trier
Imperial Abbey of Fulda

Nieder-Isenburg (often called Lower Isenburg) was a small mediaeval county in northern Rhineland-Palatinate, Germany. It was located to the east of the town of Neuwied, due north of Vallendar.

Roughly speaking, territories of the Archbishops of Trier were located to the south, and territories of the Counts of Wied to the north.

Nieder-Isenburg emerged in 1218 as a partition of the County of Isenburg-Isenburg. Nieder-Isenburg was partitioned twice: between Isenburg-Grenzau, Isenburg-Neumagen and itself in 1502, and between Isenburg-Grenzau and Isenburg-Neumagen in 1503.

Following the death of Count Ernst of Isenburg in Brussels in 1664 without direct heir, the territories of Nieder-Isenburg were claimed back as a feudal tenure by the Archbishopric of Cologne, the Archbishopric of Trier and the core tenure of Isenburg and Grenzau by the Archbishopric of Fulda. The Fulda part was eventually passed on to the Counts of Walderdorff who had to share them with the Counts of Wied, at that stage a cadet branch of the Isenburgs, following a later agreement. Eventually the Walderdorff estates were distributed to the Nassovian state in the Napoleonic era.

The towns of Ransbach and Baumbach were part of Nieder-Isenburg until 1664, when they became part of Kurtrier.

== Counts of Nieder-Isenburg (1218–1664) ==
- Theodoric I (1218–53)
- Theodoric II (1253–73)
- Salentin I (1273–1300)
- Salentin II (1300–34) with...
- Salentin III (1319–70)
- Salentin IV (1370–1420)
- Salentin V (1420–58)
- Gerlach I (1458–90)
- Gerlach II (1488–1502) with...
- James (1486–1503)
- Heinrich, 5.1.1521/22-1553
- Johann Heinrich, +aft 15.11.1565;
- Arnold, died 1577
- Anton, +Walhain 5.11.1548–1577
- Salentin VIII (1532–1610)
- Salentin IX (1580–1619) ( † 5.12.1619, Prague)
- Ernst (1584–1664)

reversion to Fulda, Cologne, and Trier.
