= Isenburg-Meerholz =

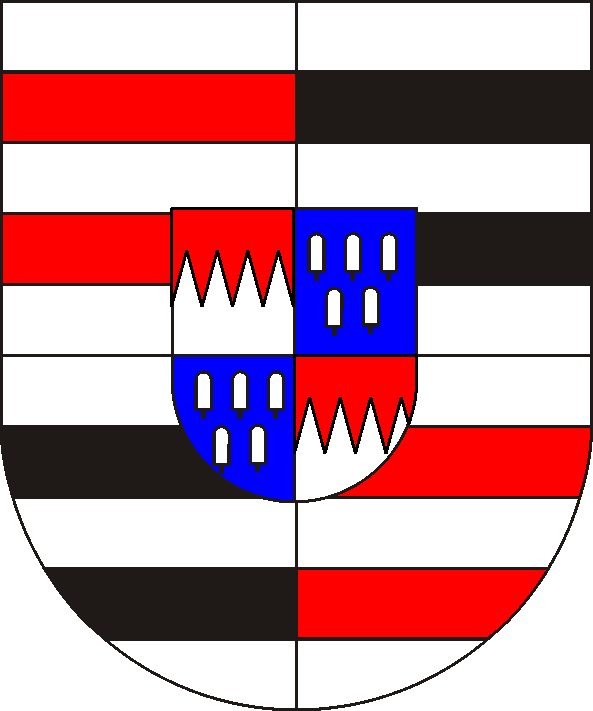
Coat of arms of Isenburg-Meerholz

Isenburg-Meerholz (or Ysenburg-Büdingen-Meerholz) was a County with Imperial immediacy in the south of Hesse, Germany.

== History ==
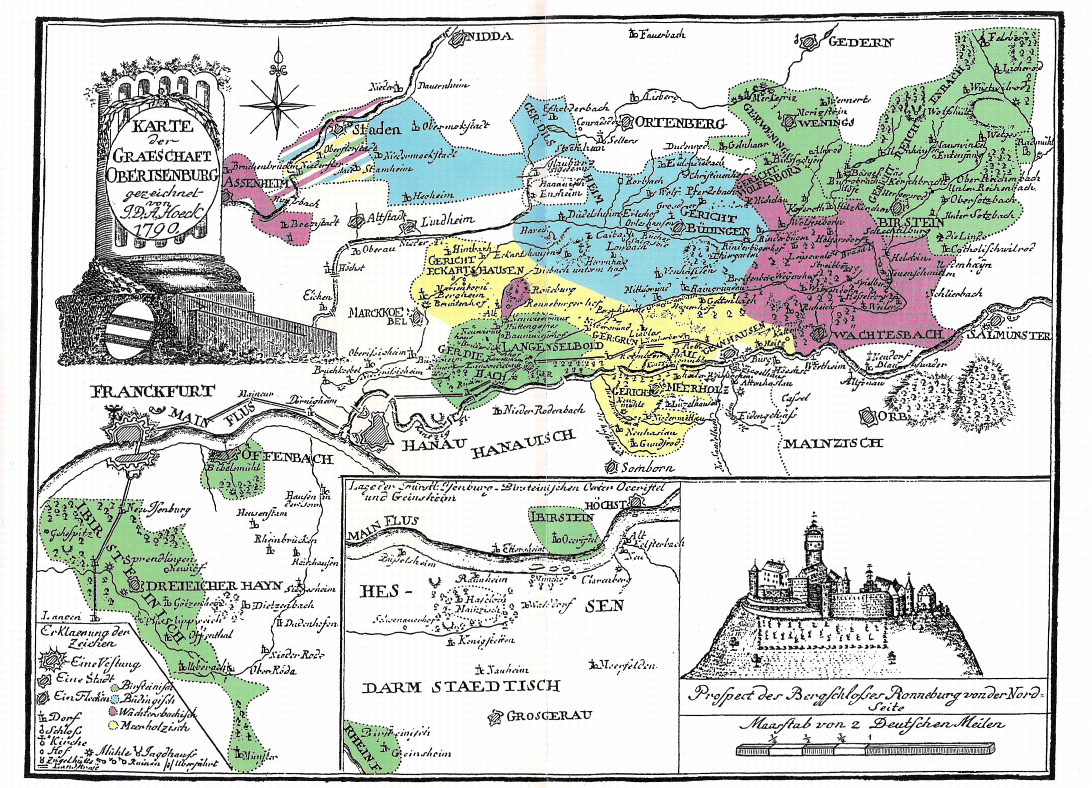
Map of the County of Oberisenburg, 1790

It was created as a partition of Isenburg-Büdingen (or Ysenburg-Büdingen) in 1687 (Third Main-Partition) for one of the branches of an ancient German House of Isenburg. It was mediatised to Principality of Isenburg (formerly of Isenburg-Birstein) in 1806.

In 2007, with the addition of Romania and Bulgaria, Meerholz (now a part of the former free town of Gelnhausen) became the European Union's new geographical centre.
