= Albert Augustus of Isenburg-Wächtersbach =

Count of Isenburg-Wächtersbach

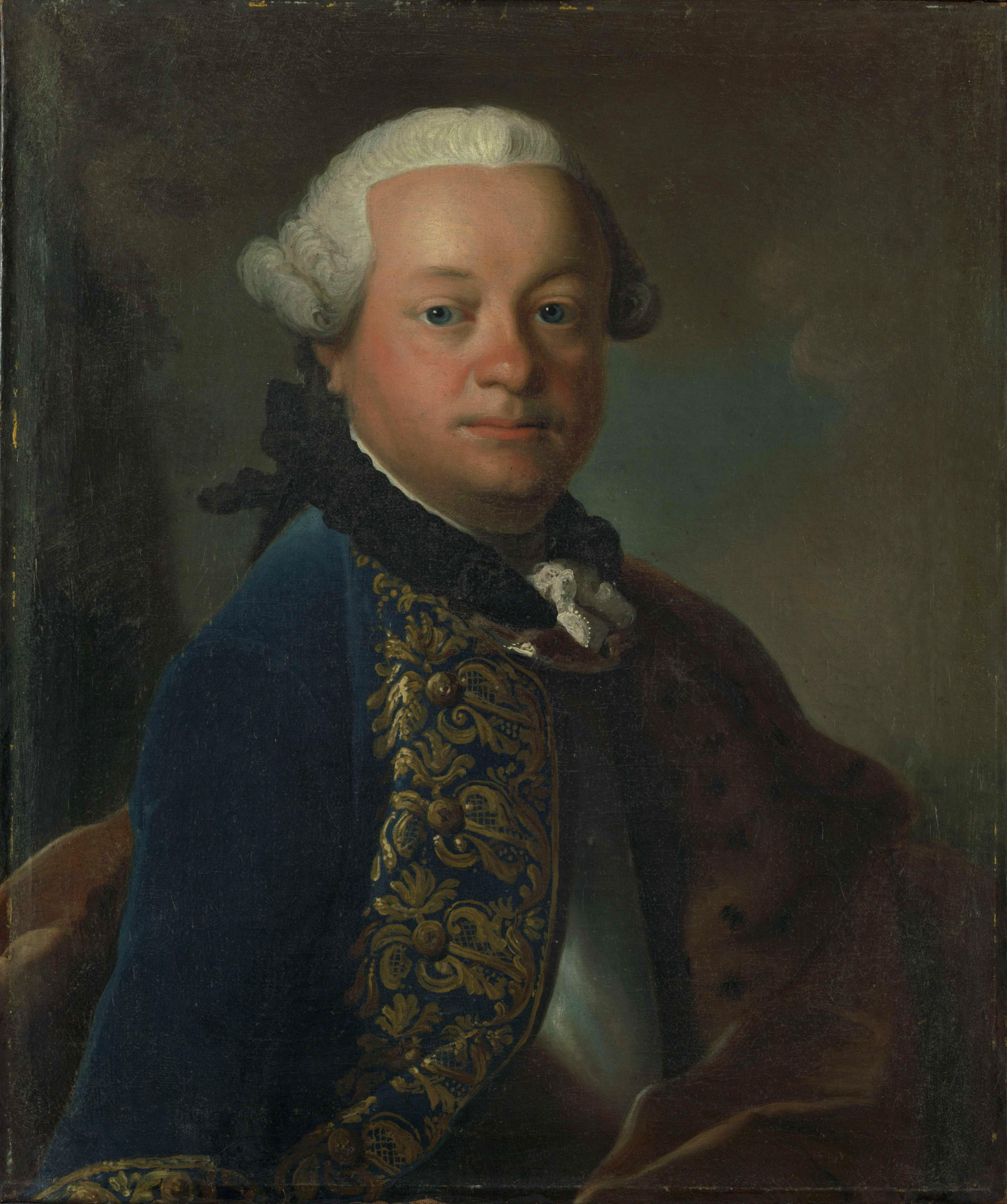
Albert Augustus of Isenburg-Wächtersbach

Albert Augustus of Isenburg-Wächtersbach was a German count of Isenburg-Wächtersbach from 1780 until 1782.

The county itself lasted from 1673 to 1806 in the central Holy Roman Empire, until it was mediated to Isenberg.
