= Isenburg-Grenzau =

Isenburg-Grenzau was the name of several states of the Holy Roman Empire, seated in the Lordship of Grenzau, in modern Rhineland-Palatinate, Germany. The first state called Isenburg-Grenzau existed 1158–1290; the second 1341–1439; and the third 1502–1664.

== Isenburg-Grenzau (1158–1290) ==
The arms of Isenburg-Grenzau

In 1158, Count Gerlach I of Isenburg-Limburg-Covern died. His territories were divided between his heirs, Henry I of Isenburg-Grenzau and Gerlach II of Isenburg-Covern. In 1213 Henry I began the construction of Castle Grenzau, located on a mountain spur along the Rhine trade route from Leipzig to Flanders.

After Henry I's death in 1220, he was succeeded by his sons Henry II and Gerlach IV. On May 22, 1258, they divided the realm into Isenburg-Grenzau (to Henry II) and Isenburg-Limburg (to Gerlach IV).

In 1286 Henry II partitioned his territories between his sons, into the states of Isenburg-Grenzau (to Eberhard I), Isenburg-Cleberg (to Louis) and Isenburg-Arnfels (to Gerlach). Eberhard died in 1290 without any heirs, so Isenburg-Grenzau passed to his eldest surviving brother, Louis.

== Isenburg-Grenzau (1341–1439) ==
The arms of Isenburg-Grenzau

Isenburg-Cleberg was partitioned in 1341 between the sons of Lothar; with Isenburg-Grenzau passing to Philip I. Philip came into conflict with the expansionist prince-Archbishop Baldwin of Luxembourg of Trier. In 1346 Baldwin expanded his power deep into the Westerwald, and the following year Philip allied with Count Reinhard I of Westerburg against him. It began the Grenzauer Feud which was only ended after the intervention of the Emperor. In 1361, Philip was forced to acknowledge the overlordship of the Archbishops shortly before his death. Philip's heirs were hardly notable, and died out in 1439. Their territories were inherited by Nassau-Beilstein, passed to the archbishops of Trier in 1446, and was finally purchased by the Counts of Lower Isenburg in 1460.

== Isenburg-Grenzau (1502–1664) ==
The arms of Isenburg-Grenzau until 1557

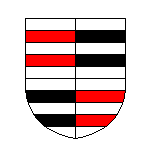
The arms of Isenburg-Grenzau after 1557

Lower Isenburg was partitioned in 1502, with Isenburg-Grenzau passing to Gerlach III. Gerlach's fame and respect, and by extension that of the House of Isenburg, had increased dramatically when he held the Emperor's banner at the Reichstag at Worms in 1495. Gerlach was succeeded by his son Henry the Elder in 1530. Two of Henry's sons, John and Salentin were sent into the church at a young age. John became the Archbishop of Trier in 1547, and Salentin the Archbishop of Cologne in 1567. Henry's other son, Anthony succeeded him in 1552. Anthony died two years later and John succeeded him. John was succeeded by his son Arnold. After Arnold died in 1577, Salentin left the church to take the countship.

Upon his departure from the office of Prince-elector and archbishop of Cologne, Gebhard Truchsess von Waldburg was elected to fill the position; Gebhard's conversion to Protestantism in 1582, his marriage to Agnes of Mansfeld-Eisleben in 1583, and his refusal to give up the Electorate triggered a schism in the Cathedral chapter of Cologne. After the election of a competing archbishop, Ernst of Bavaria, supporters of the two men pursued a war, called the Cologne War. Salentin participated in this conflict on the side of the Catholic faction of the Cathedral Chapter, and was instrumental in the destruction of Neuss in 1586, in which over 3000 people of the city were killed, and the city itself destroyed.

In his capacity as Archbishop and Prince-Elector, Salentin had greatly improved conditions in Grenzau. Isenburg-Grenzau was made an Imperial Estate of the Holy Roman Empire with a seat in the Bench of Counts of the Wetterau. After Salentin's death in 1610, he was succeeded by his elder son Salentin VIII. Salentin died in 1619 and was succeeded by his younger brother Ernest. Ernest was, inter alia, a field captain of the Imperial army during the Thirty Years' War, fighting predominantly in the Netherlands. After Ernst's death in Brussels in 1664 at age 80 and without direct heirs, his territories were reclaimed as feudal tenures by the Archbishoprics of Cologne, Trier and Fulda. The core territories, including Isenburg, were granted by Fulda to the Counts of Walderdorff. They had to share them according to a later agreement with the Counts of Wied, by then a cadet branch of the Isenburgs.
