= Louis Maximilian II of Isenburg-Wächtersbach =

Louis Maximilian II of Isenburg-Wächtersbach was a German count, and the last count of Isenburg-Wächtersbach in the central Holy Roman Empire. His countship lasted from 1805 to 1806, and ended when it was mediated to Isenberg. He was the son of Louis Maximilian I of Isenburg-Wächtersbach, and a descendant of Ferdinand Maximilian I of Isenburg-Wächtersbach.
