= Isenburg-Philippseich =

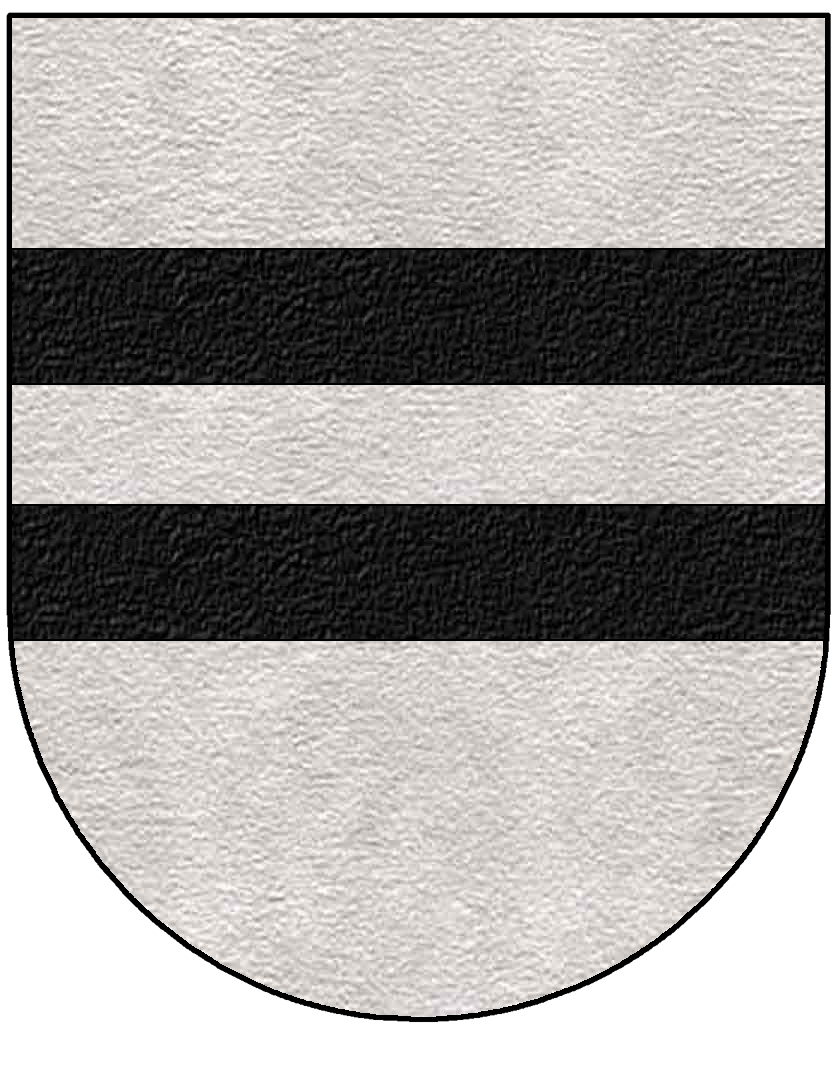
Coat of arms of the Counts of Isenburg

Isenburg-Philippseich was a County of southern Hesse, Germany. It was created in 1711 as a partition of Isenburg-Offenbach, and was mediatised to the Principality of Isenburg (until then of Isenburg-Birstein) in 1806.

== Counts of Isenburg-Philippseich (1711–1806) ==
- William Maurice II (1711–1772), (* 1688; † 1772)
- Christian Charles (1772–1779), (* 1732; † 1779)
- Charles William (1779–1781), (* 1767; † 1781)
- Henry Ferdinand (1781–1806), (* 1770; † 1838)

== Gallery ==
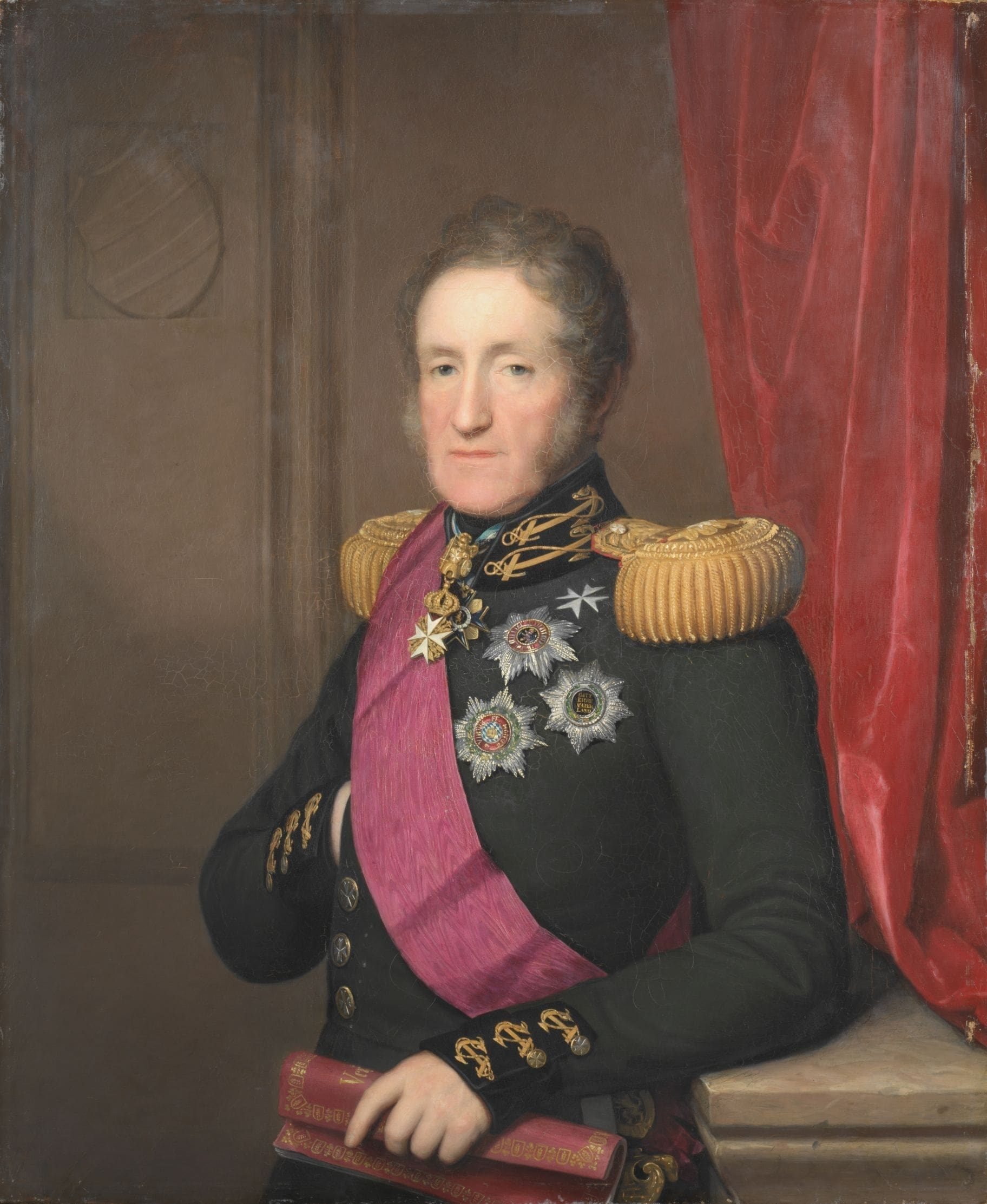
Heinrich Ferdinand, 1832.

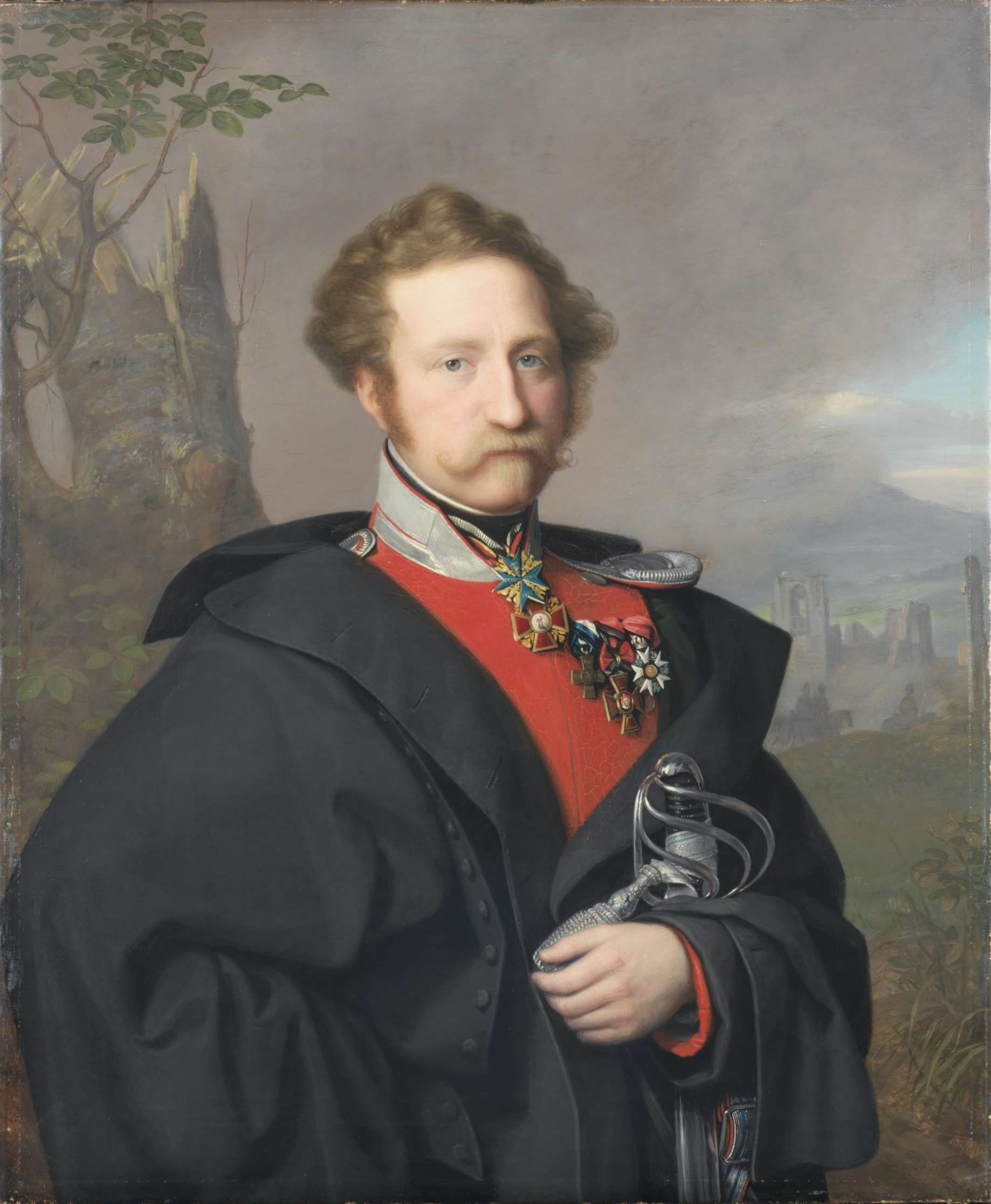
Georg Kasimir, 1837.

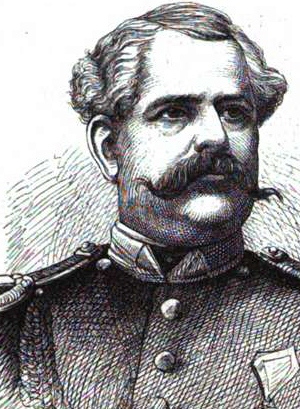
Photo of General Philipp of Isenburg-Philippseich taken in 1867.

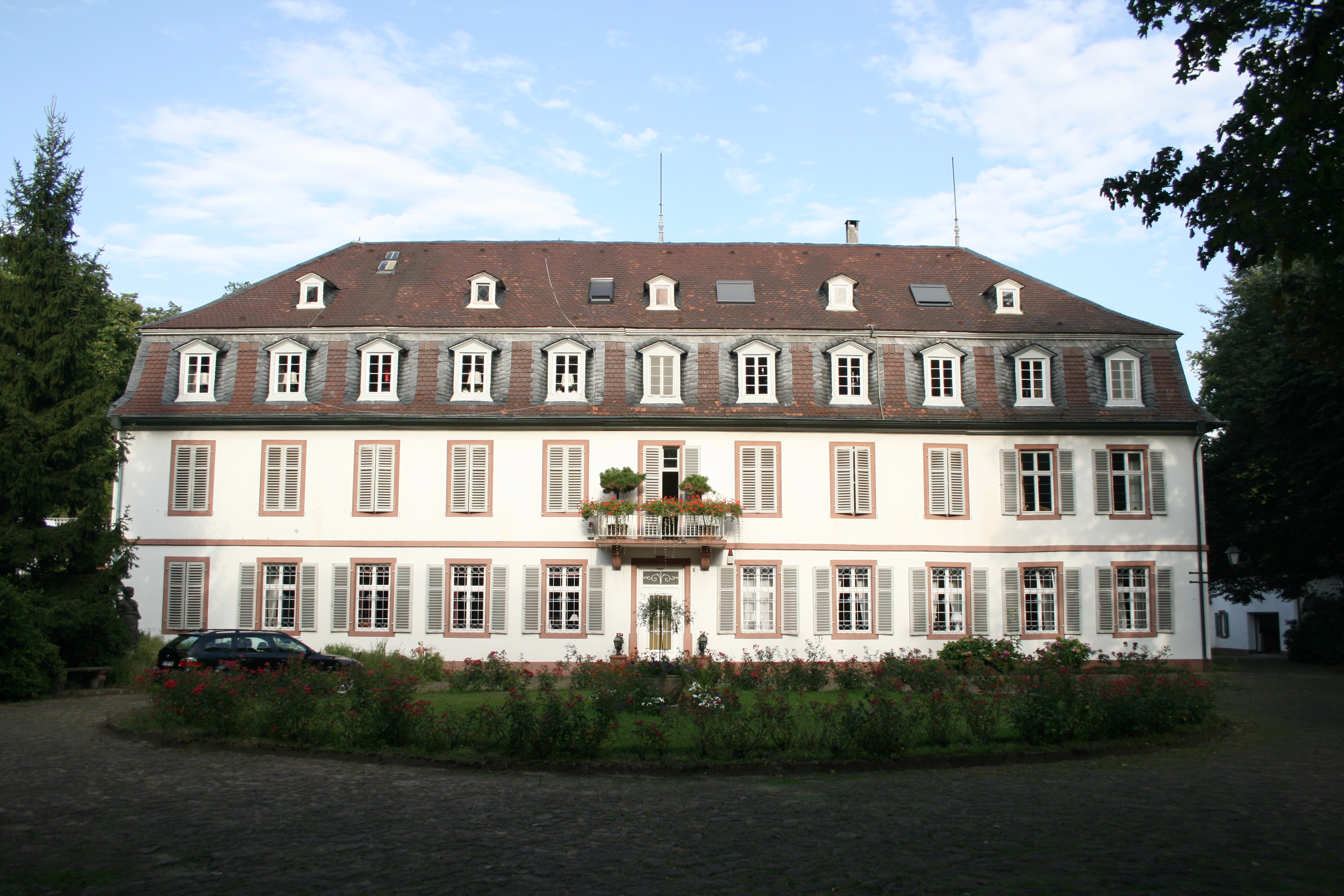
Photo taken in 2011.
