= Isenburg-Offenbach =

Historical German state

Isenburg-Offenbach
1628–1711
Capital; Circle; Bench	Offenbach; Upper Rhenish; Counts of the Wetterau
Partitioned from Isenburg-Büdingen-Birstein	1628
Partitioned into Isenburg-Eisenberg and Isenburg-Philippseich	1711

Coat of arms of the Upper Isenburg

Isenburg-Offenbach was the name of a state of the Holy Roman Empire, based around Offenbach and Neu Isenburg (built by the counts in 1699) in modern Hesse, Germany. It was created as a partition of Isenburg-Büdingen-Birstein in 1628. In 1711 the immediacy passed to Isenburg-Birstein while the line was partitioned into Isenburg-Eisenberg and Isenburg-Philippseich.

== Rulers ==
Name	Reign	Notes
Wolfgang Henry	1628–1635	
John Louis	1635–1685	Count of Isenburg-Birstein
John Philip	1685–1711	Count of Isenburg-Philippseich
Christian Henry	1685–1711	Count of Isenburg-Eisenberg
