= Isenburg-Kempenich =

Principality of the Holy Roman Empire

Isenburg-Kempenich
Capital; Circle; Bench	Kempenich none none
Superseded Kempenich	1142
Extinct; to Schöneck	1424

Isenburg-Kempenich was the name of a state of the Holy Roman Empire, based around Kempenich in modern Rhineland-Palatinate, Germany.

Isenburg-Kempenich emerged around the Lordship of Kempenich, which was first mentioned in 1093 as being ruled by Richwin of Wied. In 1143 another Richwin is mentioned, although it is unclear if it is the son of the former Richwin or if it was the former Richwin. Either way, his son Sigfried is considered the founder of the state of Isenburg-Kempenich in 1142. In 1152 Siegfried had his daughters entered into a monastery. Through marriage, Isenburg-Kempenich passed to Reynold of the House of Isenburg in 1153.

In 1158 the Lords Theodoric I and Florentin are mentioned in a document of the Emperor Frederick I Barbarossa. Both lords are mentioned in 1166 and 1173, but only Florentin was mentioned in 1183 and in 1187. Inheritance passed to the sons of Theodoric I after Florentin's death, Salentin, Rosemann and Theodoric II. Salentin died sometime after 1213 leaving Rosemann as the most powerful of the three lords. Isenburg-Kempenich benefited greatly from their close relation to Henry II of Isenburg-Grenzau, one of the most powerful lords in the region.

In 1277, Gerard I made his lordship mediate to the Archbishopric of Trier. After the death of Gerard's son Theodoric IV, a bloody succession dispute broke out in 1330 between the sons of Theodoric, Simon I and Theodoric V, and their cousin Gerard II after Simon took the lordship for himself. Gerard brought his friends into the dispute, Gerard of Landskron, John of Rheineck, Theodoric of Schönberg, and George of Eich. On 26 February 1331 the Archbishop of Trier also joined Gerard. Simon and Theodoric likewise brought allies into the conflict, and the entire lordship was devastated. Eventually the Archbishop excommunicated Simon after he had a church burned down after trying to use it to exert pressure on the other side.

The dispute was settled with the Peace of Lahnstein on 11 June 1331 after the Archbishop of Trier died and was succeeded by Baldwin of Luxembourg. Simon was left the sole ruler of Kempenich and it was decreed the lordship could no longer be partitioned. Simon I was succeeded by his son Simon II in 1341, and his brother John respected the treaty. But after the death of Simon II his sons Simon II, Theodoric VI, John and Henry co-ruled the lordship. Henry appears to have died almost immediately, and Theodoric VI was not mentioned after 1378. Simon died in 1420 without descendants, and after John died in 1424 Kempenich passed to the Lords of Schöneck. In 1434 it passed to the Archbishop of Trier, who sold the territory to the Counts of Virneburg.

Name	Reign	Notes
Siegfried	1142 – 1152	
Reynold	1153 – ?	
Theodoric I		co-ruled with...
Florentin		
Salentin		co-ruled with...
Rosemann		and...
Theodoric II	? – 1232	and later...
Theodoric III		
Gerard I		
Theodoric IV	? – 1329	
Simon I	1329–1341	co-ruled with...
Theodoric V "the Arsonist"	1329–1330	and...
Gerard II	1329–1330	
Simon II	1341–1367	
Simon III	1367–1420	co-ruled with...
Theodoric VI	1367 – ?	and...
John	1367–1424	and...
Henry	1367	
