= Schöneck, Hesse =

Schöneck
- Municipality
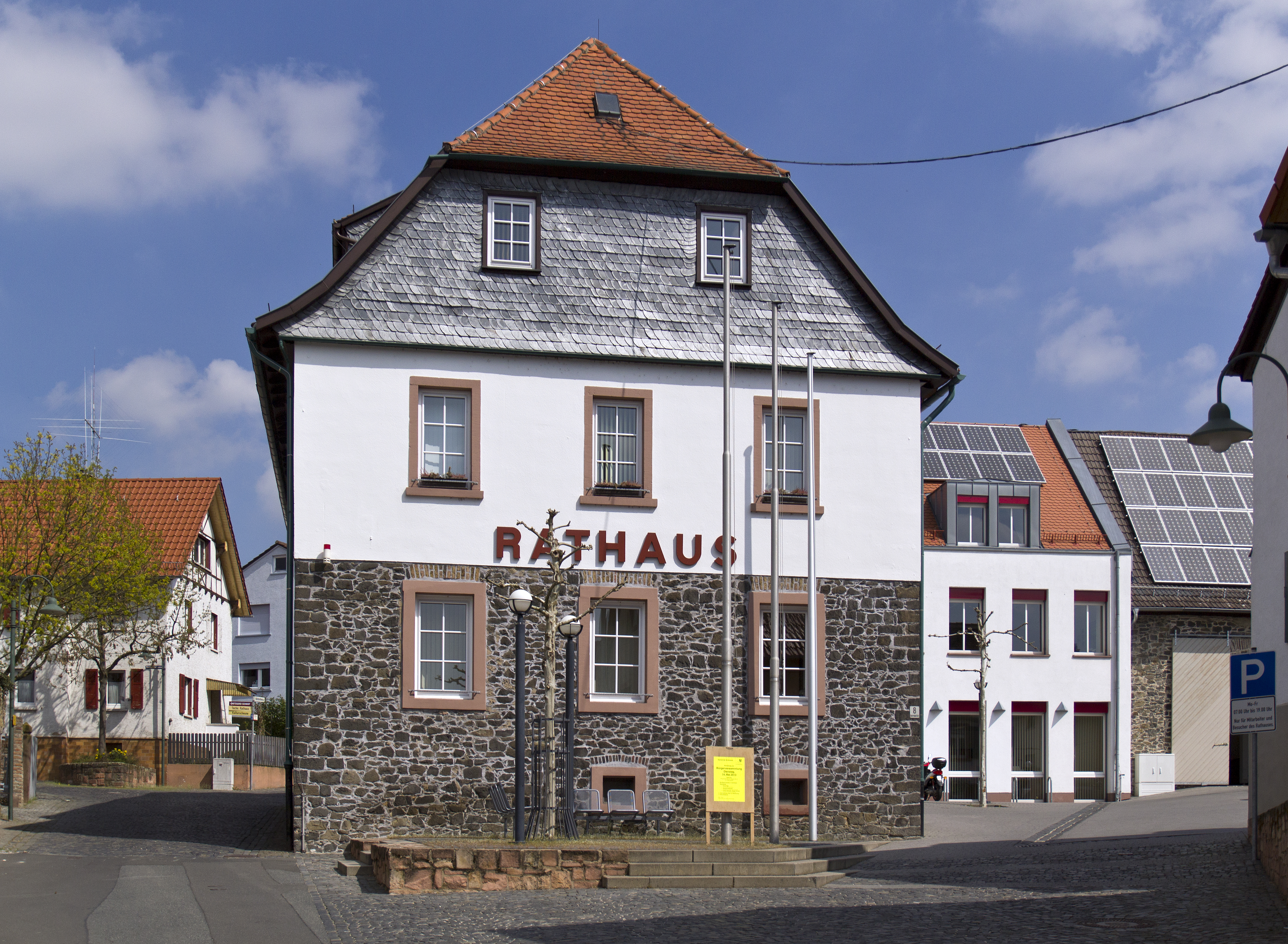
- Town hall

- Coat of arms

- Location of Schöneck within Main-Kinzig-Kreis district
- Interactive map of Schöneck
- Location within Germany Location within Hesse
- Coordinates: 50°12′5″N 8°51′15″E
- Country: Germany
- State: Hesse
- Admin. region: Darmstadt
- District: Main-Kinzig-Kreis
- Subdivisions: 3 districts

Government
  - Mayor (2024–30): Carina Wacker (CDU)

Area
  - Total: 21.5 km^{2} (8.3 sq mi)
- Elevation: 114–141 m (374–463 ft)

Population (2025-12-31)
  - Total: 11,793
  - Density: 549/km^{2} (1,420/sq mi)
- Time zone: UTC+01:00 (CET)
  - Summer (DST): UTC+02:00 (CEST)
- Postal codes: 61137
- Dialling codes: 06187
- Vehicle registration: MKK
- Website: www.schoeneck.de

Schöneck (German pronunciation: [ˈʃøːnɛk]) is a municipality in the Main-Kinzig district, in Hesse, Germany. It is situated 9 km northwest of Hanau, and 15 km northeast of Frankfurt and has 12,221 inhabitants (as of 2022-12-31).

== Notable people ==
- Johannes Meffert (1732-1795), born in Schöneck (then part of the Holy Roman Empire), emigrated to the United States and settled in Kentucky, changing his last name to Mefford. Children's entertainer Fred Rogers and Hollywood actor Tom Hanks are among his descendants.
