= Isenburg-Büdingen-Birstein =

Coat of arms of the Princes of Isenburg-Büdingen-Birstein

Isenburg and Büdingen in Birstein is a hereditary title associated with the German House of Isenburg. Prince Alexander of Isenburg (b. 1969) is the current Prince of Isenburg and Büdingen in Birstein.

== History ==
Isenburg-Büdingen-Birstein was created as a partition of Isenburg-Büdingen in 1511, and was partitioned into Isenburg-Birstein, Isenburg-Büdingen, and Isenburg-Offenbach in 1628.

In the early 16th century, the late Gothic stone house of Büdingen was built by Count Ludwig II of Isenburg for his son, later known as Johann V of Isenburg and Büdingen in Birstein.

Birstein Castle has been the residence of the counts or princes of Isenburg since 1517. The counts were elevated to imperial princes in 1744.

== Notable people ==
- Karl II, Prince of Isenburg-Büdingen in Birstein
