= Isenburg-Birstein =

Coat of arms of Isennburg-Birstein

Isenburg-Birstein was the name of two German historical states centred on Birstein in southeastern Hesse, Germany.

== History ==
The first "Isenburg-Birstein" was a County and was created as a partition of Isenburg-Büdingen-Birstein in 1628. It was merged into Isenburg-Offenbach in 1664.

The second "Isenburg-Birstein" was a County (later Principality), created as a partition of Isenburg-Offenbach in 1711 and elevated to Principality in 1744. It was renamed the "Principality of Isenburg" in 1806 when Isenburg-Birstein joined the Confederation of the Rhine and was granted the mediatized Isenburgian Countships of Isenburg-Büdingen, Isenburg-Meerholz, Isenburg-Philippseich, and Isenburg-Wächtersbach.

== Counts of Isenburg-Birstein (1628–1664) ==
Birstein Arms

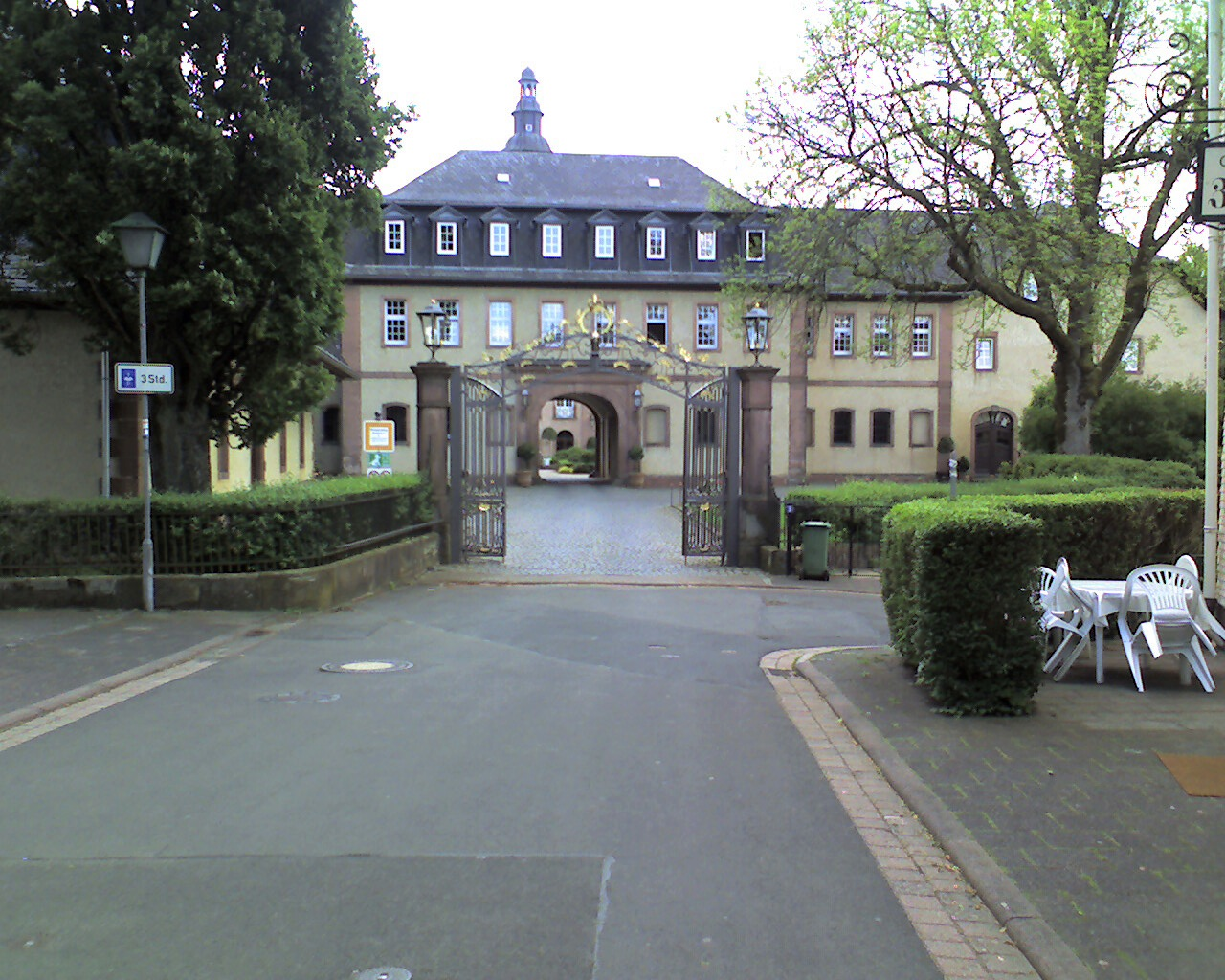
Birstein Castle

- William Otto (1628–1635)
- Christian Maurice (1635–1664) with...
- Wolfgang Ernest II (1635–1641) with...
- John Louis (Count of Isenburg-Offenbach) (1641–1664)

To Isenburg-Offenbach.

== Count of Isenburg-Birstein (1711–1744) ==
- Wolfgang Ernest I (1711–1754)

== Princes of Isenburg-Birstein (1744–1806) ==
- Wolfgang Ernst I of Isenburg-Birstein (1711–1754)
- Wolfgang Ernst II of Isenburg-Birstein (1754–1803)
- Charles (Prince of Isenburg) (1803–1806)

Renamed to Isenburg.
