= Isenburg-Wächtersbach =

Coat of arms of the House of Isenburg

Isenburg-Wächtersbach was a County of southern Hesse, Germany, for almost all its existence within the Holy Roman Empire.

== History ==
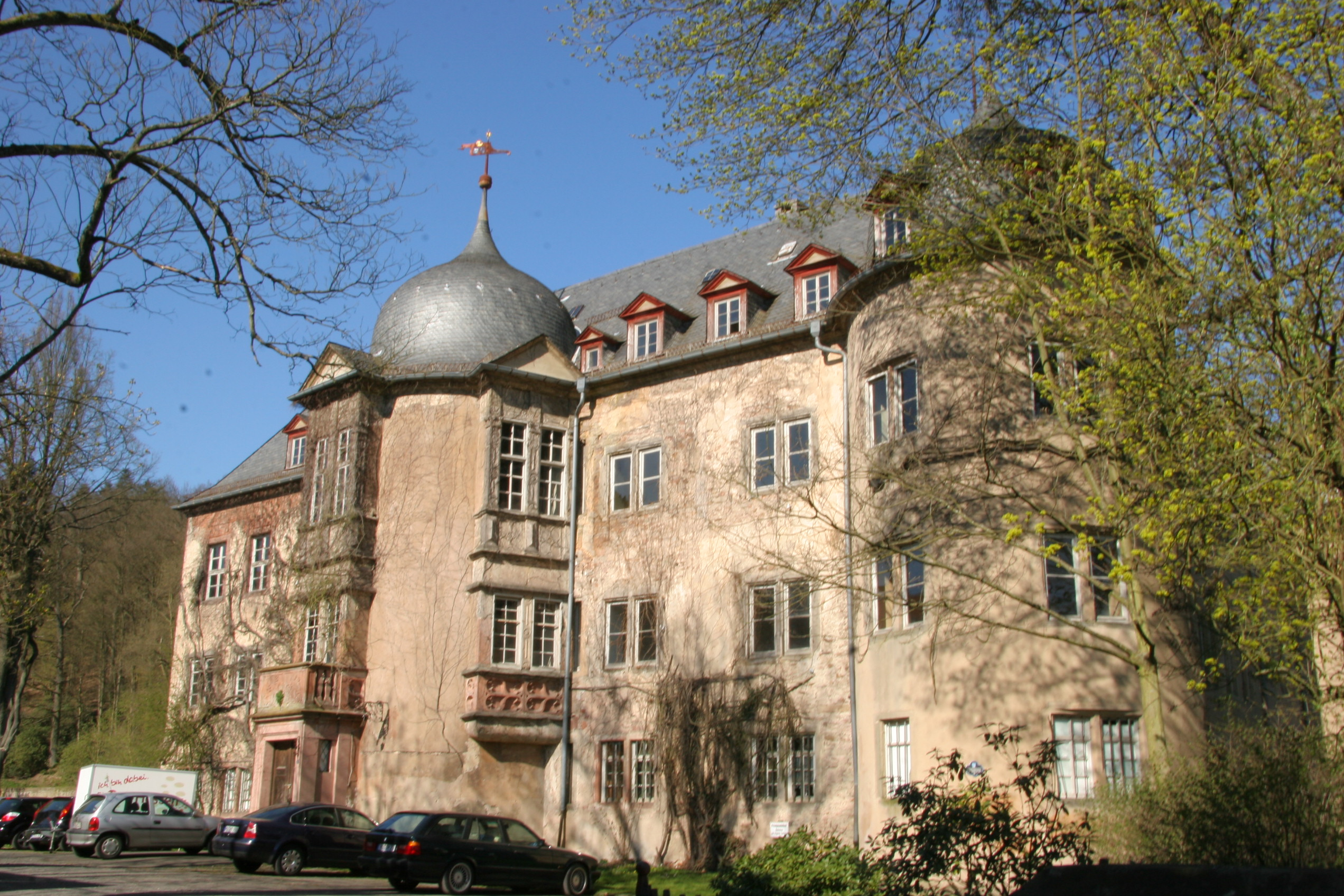
Wächtersbach castle, Main-Kinzig-Kreis, Hesse

It was created in 1673 as a partition of Isenburg-Büdingen, and was mediatised to the Principality of Isenburg-Birstein, later simply Principality of Isenburg, in 1806.

In 1865, the Head of this line of the family, Ferdinand Maximilian was raised to the rank of Prince.
