= Ernest Casimir =

Ernest or Ernst Casimir may refer to:

- Ernest Casimir, Count of Nassau-Weilburg (1607–1655), founder of the younger line of Nassau-Weilburg
- Ernest Casimir I, Count of Nassau-Dietz (1573–1632)
- Prince Ernest Casimir of the Netherlands (May 1822 – August or October 1822)
- Ernst Casimir I, 1st Prince of Ysenburg and Büdingen (1781–1852)
- Ernst Casimir II, Prince of Ysenburg and Büdingen (1806–1861)

== See also ==
- Ernest Casimir-Lambert (1897–1931), Belgian bobsledder
