= Princess Anna of Ysenburg and Büdingen =

Princess Anna
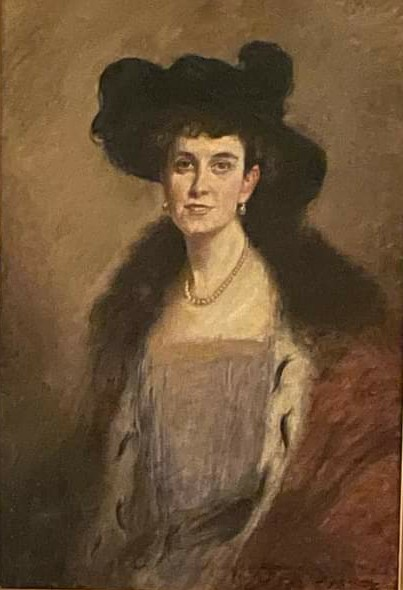
- Portrait by Bernhard Zickendraht, 1924

Princess consort of Lippe
- Tenure: 26 April 1922 – 30 December 1949
- Born: 10 February 1886; Büdingen, German Empire
- Died: 8 February 1980 (aged 93); Detmold, West Germany
- Spouse: Count Ernst of Lippe-Weissenfeld (m. 1911; died 1914) Leopold IV, Prince of Lippe (m. 1922)
- Issue: Princess Eleonore of Lippe-Weissenfeld; Armin, Prince of Lippe
Names
- Princess Anna of Ysenburg and Büdingen
- House: Ysenburg-Büdingen
- Father: Bruno, Prince of Ysenburg and Büdingen
- Mother: Countess Bertha of Castell-Rüdenhausen

Princess Anna of Ysenburg und Büdingen (10 February 1886, Büdingen – 8 February 1980, Detmold) was the youngest child of Bruno, Prince of Ysenburg and Büdingen and his second wife, Countess Bertha of Castell-Rüdenhausen. Through her second marriage to Leopold IV, Prince of Lippe, Anna was the titular Princess consort of Lippe.

== Marriages and issue ==
Anna married firstly to Count Ernst of Lippe-Weissenfeld (1870–1914), member of the junior line of the House of Lippe, sixth child and youngest son of Count Franz of Lippe-Weissenfeld (1820–1880) and his wife, Baroness Marie of Beschwitz (1836–1921), daughter of Baron Ferdinand of Beschwitz, on 21 November 1911 at Schloss Büdingen in Büdingen.

Anna and Ernst had one daughter before Ernst was killed at Gołdap on the Eastern Front during World War I on 11 September 1914:

- Princess Eleonore of Lippe-Weissenfeld (born 11 August 1913 in Dresden; died 19 October 1964 in The Hague)

∞ Sweder, Count of Rechteren-Limpurg (1910–1972) on 19 May 1935 in Detmold, divorced in 1944

- Adolph Roderik Ernst Leopold, Count of Rechteren-Limpurg (born 25 November 1938)

∞ Ingrid Pieksma-Klynstra (born 30 December 1935), mother of Brigitte Klynstra (born 10 January 1959) and grandmother of Prince Hugo de Bourbon de Parme (born 20 January 1997)

- Anna Pia Amalaswintha, Countess of Rechteren-Limpurg (born 27 September 1940)

∞ Count Hans Günter of Solms-Laubach (born 26 June 1927 in Munich), had two issue

Anna married secondly to Leopold IV, Prince of Lippe, second eldest child of Count Ernst of Lippe-Biesterfeld and his wife, Countess Karoline of Wartensleben, on 26 April 1922 in Büdingen.

Anna and Leopold had one son:

- Armin Leopold Ernst Bruno Heinrich Willa August, Prince of Lippe (1924–2015)

∞ Traute Becker (born 16 February 1925 in Hänigsen, near Uetze) on 27 March 1953 in Göttingen

- Stephan Leopold Justus Richard, Hereditary Prince of Lippe (born 24 May 1959)

∞ Countess Maria of Solms-Laubach (born 12 August 1968 in Frankfurt am Main) on 13 October 1994, had five issue

== Death ==
Princess Anna died on 8 February 1980 in Detmold, aged 93. Her body was interred, alongside her second husband, in the Lippe family crypt in Christuskirche, Detmold, Germany.

== Ancestry ==
Ancestors of Princess Anna of Ysenburg and Büdingen

8. Ernst Casimir I, Prince of Ysenburg and Büdingen
4. Ernst Casimir II, Prince of Ysenburg and Büdingen
9. Countess Ferdinande of Erbach-Schönberg
2. Bruno, Prince of Ysenburg and Büdingen
10. Albrecht, Count of Erbach-Fürstenau
5. Countess Thekla of Erbach-Fürstenau
11. Princess Sophie Emilie Luise of Hohenlohe-Neuenstein-Ingelfingen
1. Princess Anna of Ysenburg and Büdingen
12. Christian Friedrich, Count of Castell-Rüdenhausen
6. Adolf, Hereditary Count of Castell-Rüdenhausen
13. Countess Luise Carolina of Ortenburg
3. Countess Bertha of Castell-Rüdenhausen
14. Baron Karl Philipp Friedrich von Thüngen
7. Baroness Friederike Marie Christiane von Thüngen
15. Sophie Auguste Nathalie von Thümmel

Princess Anna of Ysenburg and Büdingen House of Ysenburg-Büdingen Cadet branch of the House of Ysenburg Born: 10 February 1886 Died: 8 February 1980
Titles in pretence
Preceded by Princess Bertha of Hesse-Philippsthal-Barchfeld	— TITULAR — Princess consort of Lippe; 26 April 1922 – 30 December 1949; Reason for succession failure: Principality abolished in 1918	Succeeded by Marie Traute Becker
