= Ernst Casimir II of Ysenburg and Büdingen =

Ernst Casimir II

Prince of Ysenburg and Büdingen
- Reign: 1 November 1848 – 16 February 1861
- Predecessor: Ernst Casimir I
- Successor: Bruno
- Born: 14 December 1806; Büdingen
- Died: 16 February 1861 (aged 54); Büdingen
- Spouse: Countess Thekla of Erbach-Fürstenau
- Issue: Bruno, 3rd Prince of Ysenburg and Büdingen; Prince Adalbert; Princess Emma; Princess Agnes; Prince Lothar
Names
- Ernst Casimir
- House: House of Ysenburg and Büdingen
- Father: Ernst Casimir I, 1st Prince of Ysenburg and Büdingen
- Mother: Countess Ferdinande of Erbach-Schönberg

Ernst Casimir II of Ysenburg and Büdingen (14 December 1806, Büdingen – 16 February 1861, Büdingen) was the second Prince of Ysenburg and Büdingen. Ernst Casimir was the eldest son and second eldest child of Ernst Casimir I, 1st Prince of Ysenburg and Büdingen and his wife Countess Ferdinande of Erbach-Schönberg.

== Education and military service ==
At the age of 12, Ernst Casimir attended the Royal Prussian Pädagogium in Halle. After passing Maturum in 1826, Ernst Casimir studied first at the University of Giessen and later at the Berlin College of History and Archeology. To learn the French language, he held temporarily studied in Basel and Geneva. Ernst Casimir also served for several years in the Imperial and Royal Army of the Austrian Empire. On 1 November 1848, succeeded to the title of Prince of Ysenburg and Büdingen upon the abdication of his father.

== Marriage and issue ==
Ernst Casimir married Countess Thekla of Erbach-Fürstenau, fourth eldest daughter of Albrecht, Count of Erbach-Fürstenau and his wife Princess Emilie of Hohenlohe-Neuenstein-Ingelfingen, on 8 September 1836 in Beerfelden. Ernst Casimir and Thekla had five children:

- Bruno Casimir Albert Emil Ferdinand, 3rd Prince of Ysenburg and Büdingen (born 14 June 1837 in Büdingen; died 26 January 1906 in Büdingen)

∞ Princess Mathilde of Solms-Hohensolms-Lich (1842–1867) on 31 July 1862 in Lich, had two issue
∞ Countess Bertha of Castell-Rüdenhausen (1845–1927) on 30 September 1869 in Rüdenhausen, had eight issue

- Prince Adalbert of Ysenburg and Büdingen (born 17 February 1839 in Büdingen; died 29 August 1885 in Kennenberg)

∞ Princess Alexandra of Ysenburg and Büdingen in Wächtersbach (1855–1932) on 18 November 1875 in Wächtersbach, no issue

- Princess Emma Ferdinande Emilie of Ysenburg and Büdingen (born 23 February 1841 in Büdingen; died 22 April 1926 in Rüdenhausen)

∞ Wolfgang, Prince of Castell-Rüdenhausen (1830–1913) on 17 May 1859 in Büdingen, had nine issue

- Princess Agnes Marie Luitgarde of Ysenburg and Büdingen (born 20 March 1843 in Büdingen; died 17 October 1912 in Meerholz)

∞ Karl, Count of Ysenburg and Büdingen in Meerholz (1819–1900) on 21 November 1865 in Büdingen, had five issue, among which:
1. Count Friedrich of Ysenburg and Büdingen in Meerholz, who married Princess Marie Reuss of Greiz (daughter of Heinrich XX, Prince Reuss of Greiz), no issue
2. Countess Gisela of Ysenburg and Büdingen in Meerholz, who married Prince Friedrich Wilhelm of Lippe (son of Julius, Count of Lippe-Biesterfeld) and had a daughter, Princess Calixta of Lippe

- Prince Lothar of Ysenburg and Büdingen (born 27 September 1851 in Büdingen; died 23 February 1888 in Wiesbaden)

∞ Countess Jacqueline Worbert of Wassenaer-Starrenburg (1853–1930) on 19 August 1875 in Almelo, no issue

Ernst Casimir II of Ysenburg and Büdingen House of Ysenburg-Büdingen Cadet branch of the House of Ysenburg Born: 14 December 1806 Died: 16 February 1861
German nobility
Preceded by Ernst Casimir I	Prince of Ysenburg and Büdingen; 1 November 1848 – 16 February 1861	Succeeded by Bruno
