= Ernst Casimir I of Ysenburg and Büdingen =

Ernst Casimir I
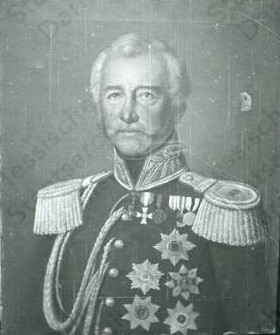
- Portrait of Ernst Casimir I
- Born: 20 January 1781; Büdingen
- Died: 12 January 1852 (aged 70); Büdingen
- Spouse: Ferdinande, Countess von Erbach-Schönberg
- Issue: Ernst Casimir II, Prince of Ysenburg and Büdingen
- House: Ysenburg-Büdingen
- Father: Ernst Casimir II Graf of Isenburg und Büdingen
- Mother: Eleonore of Bentheim und Steinfurt

Ernst Casimir I, Prince of Ysenburg and Büdingen (20 January 1781 – 1 December 1852) was a prince of Isenburg-Büdingen, a former County of southern Hesse, Germany.

== Early life and education ==
Ernst Casimir II von Isenburg-Büdingen was born on 20 January 1781, in Büdingen to Ernst Casimir von Isenburg-Büdingen and Countess Eleonore von Bentheim-Steinfurt. He had a younger sister Auguste Caroline (1790–1857).

Casimir was educated by tutors and later at the academy in Karlsruhe. Since he was not yet of legal age when his father died in 1801, he could not take over the affairs of the state; his mother was his regent.

== Later life and military service ==
Ernst Casimir first entered the Baden military service. On May 10, 1804, he married Countess Ferdinande zu Erbach-Schönberg, shortly thereafter he took over the government from his mother, but this did not last long.

During this time of general upheaval in the political situation in Europe, his rule was mediated in 1806 and came to the Principality of Isenburg, whose head was Carl, Prince of Isenburg, a founding member of the Confederation of the Rhine (and later, until 1813, French major general). As a brigadier general on the side of the Allied anti-Napoleonic troops, Ernst Casimir took part in the wars of liberation against Napoleonic France. He took part in battles near Lyon, Strasbourg, and Selz. Due to the decisions made at the Congress of Vienna, the entire Confederation of the Rhine Principality of Isenburg initially fell to the Austrian Empire in 1815. In 1816 Austria handed over the areas of the principality to the Grand Duchy of Hesse (Hessen-Darmstadt), which agreed with the Elector (Hesse-Kassel) on a division. The areas of Ysenburg-Büdingen-Büdingen, which formerly belonged to the old German Empire, remained with the Grand Duchy of Hesse. In 1826 Ernst Casimir was appointed the first President of the First Chamber of the Estates of the Grand Duchy of Hesse. In this function he primarily took care of the affairs of his inherited possessions.

Ernst Casimir contributed to the Latin school founded by Count Wolfgang Ernst in Büdingen which became a state grammar school (today the Wolfgang-Ernst-Gymnasium). He was a Freemason, e.g. he is listed as an honorary member in the register of members of the Frankfurt Lodge Carl zum aufliegend Licht, which was under the protection of Landgrave Karl von Hessen-Kassel.

== Marriage and issue ==
Children
	Birth	Death	Spouse	Issue
Princess Adelheid von Ysenburg-Büdingen	11 March 1805	21 November 1873		No issue
Prince Ernst Casimir II von Ysenburg-Büdingen	14 December 1806	16 February 1861	Thekla Adelheid von Erbach-Fürstenau	Had issue
Princess Marie von Ysenburg-Büdingen	4 October 1808	11 October 1872	Ludwig von Solms-Hohensolms-Lich	Had issue
Princess Mathilde von Ysenburg-Büdingen	1811	1886		No issue
Prince Gustav von Ysenburg-Büdingen	1813	1883	Bertha von Holleben	Had issue
Princess Ida von Ysenburg-Büdingen	1817	1900	Reinhard von Solms-Laubach	No issue
Unnamed girl	23 February 1821	4 March 1821		
Unnamed girl	1 August 1822	1 August 1822		

Ernst Casimir died on 12 January 1852, in Büdingen.
