= Charles of Solms-Hohensolms-Lich =

German politician

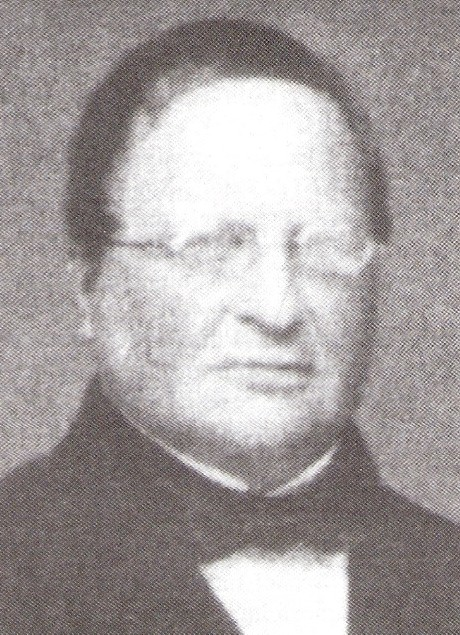
- Charles of Solms-Hohensolms-Lich
- Born: 27 June 1866; Lich, Grand Duchy of Hesse
- Died: 26 July 1920 (aged 54); Lich, Germany
- Noble family: Solms-Hohensolms-Lich
- Spouse: Princess Emma of Stolberg-Wernigerode (m. 1894)
- Issue: Philip Hermann, Hereditary Prince of Solms-Hohensolms-Lich; Anne-Agnes, Princess Carl of Castell-Castell; Elizabeth of Solms-Hohensolms-Lich; Johanna Marie of Solms-Hohensolms-Lich
- Father: Hermann of Solms-Hohensolms-Lich
- Mother: Countess Agnes of Stolberg-Wernigerode

Prince Charles Ferdinand William of Solms-Lich-Hohensolms (27 June 1866, in Lich – 26 July 1920) was a German politician. He was president of the First Chamber of the Estates of the Grand Duchy of Hesse. His sister, Princess Eleonore of Solms-Hohensolms-Lich married Ernest Louis, Grand Duke of Hesse

== Early life ==
Charles was the eldest son of Prince Hermann of Solms-Hohensolms-Lich (1838–1899) and his wife Agnes, Countess of Stolberg-Wernigerode (1842–1904).

== Marriage and issue ==
He married on 16 October 1894 in Wernigerode with Princess Emma of Stolberg-Wernigerode (1875–1956), his cousin and daughter of the prince Otto of Stolberg-Wernigerode. The marriage produced four children:

- Philip Hermann (1895–1918), Hereditary Prince of Solms-Hohensolms-Lich; fell in battle at Kostiantynivka (Ukraine)
- Anne-Agnes (1899–1987), married in 1923 Prince Carl of Castell-Castell (1897–1945)
- Elizabeth (1903–1992), married in 1944 historian Otto Vossler (1902–1987)
- Johanna Marie (1905–1982), married in 1924 Count George Frederick of Solms-Laubach (1899–1969; grandson of Bruno, 3rd Prince of Ysenburg and Büdingen); they had issue, among which:
  - Countess Irene of Solms-Laubach, mother of Countess Donata of Castell-Rüdenhausen and grandmother of Georg Friedrich, Prince of Prussia
  - Countess Monika of Solms-Laubach, wife of Prince Ernest Augustus of Hanover

As his only son Philip was killed in World War 1 in 1918, after Charles' death in 1920 his younger brother Reinhard Louis (1867–1951) inherited the title of Fürst of Solms-Hohensolms-Lich.

== Politics ==
When his father, Hermann, Prince of Solms-Hohensolms-Lich, died in 1899, Charles took over as sovereign. As a Hessian nobleman, he was a member of the First Chamber of the Estates of the Grand Duchy of Hesse under the 1899 constitution until the November Revolution of 1918. He was Vice President of the First Chamber from 1908 to 1914 and President from 1914 to 1918. From 1901 to 1918, he was also a member of the Prussian House of Lords.

== Honours and awards ==
- Grand Duchy of Hesse:
  - Grand Cross of the Merit Order of Philip the Magnanimous, 25 November 1898
  - Grand Cross of the Ludwig Order, 2 February 1905
  - Knight of the Order of the Golden Lion, with Collar, 24 May 1910
- Mecklenburg:
  - Grand Cross of the House Order of the Wendish Crown, with Crown in Ore
  - Grand Cross of the Order of the Griffon
- Kingdom of Prussia:
  - Knight of Justice of the Johanniter Order, 18 February 1901
  - Knight of the Royal Order of the Crown, 1st Class
- Württemberg: Knight of the Friedrich Order, 1st Class, 1892

== Literature ==
- Jochen Lengemann: Hesse Landtag 1808–1996, 1996, ISBN 3-7708-1071-6, page 361
- Gothaisches Genealogisches Taschenbuch der Fürstlichen Häuser (Hofkalender), 179 (1942), p. 312
