= Bruno, Prince of Ysenburg and Büdingen =

Bruno
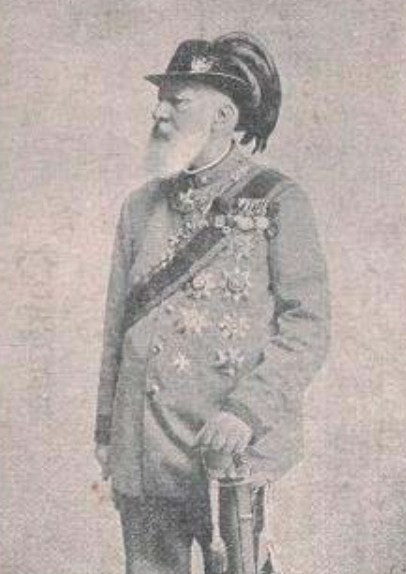

Prince of Ysenburg and Büdingen
- Reign: 16 February 1861 – 26 January 1906
- Predecessor: Ernst Casimir II
- Successor: Wolfgang
- Born: 14 June 1837; Büdingen, (Hesse), Germany
- Died: 26 January 1906 (aged 68); Büdingen, (Hesse), Germany
- Spouse: Princess Mathilde of Solms-Hohensolms-Lich (m. 1862; died 1867) Countess Bertha of Castell-Rüdenhausen (m. 1869)
- Issue: Princess Hedwig; Princess Elisabeth; Princess Emma; Princess Marie; Wolfgang, 4th Prince of Ysenburg and Büdingen; Princess Thekla; Princess Mathilde; Princess Helene; Princess Hertha; Princess Anna
Names
- Bruno Casimir Albert Emil Ferdinand
- House: Ysenburg and Büdingen
- Father: Ernst Casimir II, 2nd Prince of Ysenburg and Büdingen
- Mother: Countess Thekla of Erbach-Fürstenau

Bruno Casimir Albert Emil Ferdinand of Ysenburg and Büdingen (14 June 1837 – 26 January 1906) was the third Prince of Ysenburg and Büdingen. Bruno was the eldest son of Ernst Casimir II, 2nd Prince of Ysenburg and Büdingen and his wife Countess Thekla of Erbach-Fürstenau.

== Political career ==
As a nobleman, Bruno was a member of the First Chamber of the Estates of the Grand Duchy of Hesse from 1861 to 1906. He served as its president first between 1878 and 1889, and second between 1889 and 1900.

== Marriage and issue ==
Firstly, Bruno married Princess Mathilde of Solms-Hohensolms-Lich, daughter of Ferdinand, Prince of Solms-Hohensolms-Lich and his wife Countess Caroline of Collalto und San Salvatore, on 31 July 1862 in Lich. Bruno and Mathilde had two daughters before Mathilde's death on 11 September 1867:

- Princess Hedwig of Ysenburg and Büdingen (1 November 1863 Büdingen – 1 July 1925 Ortenberg)

∞ Botho, Prince of Stolberg-Rossla (1850–1893) on 27 September 1883 in Büdingen; had issue.
∞ Count Kuno of Stolberg-Rossla (1862–1921) on 31 August 1902 in Rossla; no issue.

- Princess Elisabeth of Ysenburg and Büdingen (21 December 1864 Büdingen – 16 November 1946 Heilsberg)

∞ Rudolf, Baron of Thüngen (1855–1929) on 25 September 1889 in Büdingen; had issue.

Bruno married secondly to Countess Bertha of Castell-Rüdenhausen, daughter of Adolf, Hereditary Count of Castell-Rüdenhausen and his wife Baroness Marie of Thüngen, on 30 September 1869 in Rüdenhausen. Bruno and Bertha had eight children:

- Princess Emma of Ysenburg and Büdingen (28 August 1870 Büdingen – 13 December 1944 Laubach)

∞ Count Otto of Solms-Laubach (1860–1904) on 14 April 1898 in Büdingen; had issue, among which George Frederick, Count of Solms-Laubach (father of Countess Monika zu Solms-Laubach, wife of Prince Ernest Augustus of Hanover, and maternal grandfather of Countess Donata of Castell-Rüdenhausen).

- Princess Marie of Ysenburg and Büdingen (28 May 1875 Büdingen – 22 October 1952 Gießen).
- Wolfgang, 4th Prince of Ysenburg and Büdingen (30 March 1877 Büdingen – 29 July 1920 Gößweinstein)

∞ Countess Adelheid of Rechteren-Limpurg (1881–1970) on 26 September 1901 in Sommerhausen; no issue.

- Princess Thekla of Ysenburg and Büdingen (16 October 1878 Büdingen – 22 February 1950 Mistelbach)

∞ Manfred V, Prince of Collalto and San Salvatore (1870–1940) on 9 May 1901 in Büdingen; had issue.

- Princess Mathilde of Ysenburg and Büdingen (26 March 1880 Büdingen – 25 April 1947 Herrnsheim)

∞ Cornelius, Baron Heyl of Herrnsheim (1874–1954) on 11 April 1907 in Büdingen; had issue.

- Princess Helene of Ysenburg and Büdingen (14 November 1881 Büdingen – 22 March 1951 Gelnhausen).
- Princess Hertha of Ysenburg and Büdingen (27 December 1883 Büdingen – 30 May 1972 Glücksburg)

∞ Prince Albert of Schleswig-Holstein-Sonderburg-Glücksburg (1863–1948) on 15 September 1920 in Büdingen; had issue.

- Princess Anna of Ysenburg and Büdingen (10 February 1886 Büdingen – 8 February 1980 Detmold).

∞ Count Ernst of Lippe-Weissenfeld (1870–1914) on 21 November 1911 in Büdingen; had issue.
∞ Leopold IV, Prince of Lippe (1871–1949) on 26 April 1922 in Büdingen; had issue.

== Life ==
Bruno studied law at the University of Göttingen. In 1857, he became a member of fraternity Saxonia Göttingen Corps. After graduation, he was Imperial and Royal Major.

== Honours and awards ==
- Grand Duchy of Hesse:
  - Knight of the Ludwig Order, 1st Class, 12 January 1860; Grand Cross, 5 August 1879
  - Grand Cross of the Merit Order of Philip the Magnanimous, with Swords, 26 October 1866
  - Military Medical Cross, 8 May 1872
  - Knight of the Order of the Golden Lion, with Collar
- (Austrian Empire) (Kingdom of Hungary) Austria-Hungary: Knight of the Order of the Iron Crown, 1st Class, 1880
- Kingdom of Bavaria: Grand Cross of the Merit Order of the Bavarian Crown, 1892
- (Kingdom of Hanover) Hanoverian Royal Family: Commander of the Order of Ernst August, 1st Class
- Kingdom of Prussia:
  - Knight of Honour of the Johanniter Order, 1861; Knight of Justice, 1876
  - Knight of the Royal Order of the Crown, 3rd Class with Red Cross on White Field and Commemoration Band, 18 March 1872
- Saxe-Weimar-Eisenach: Grand Cross of the Order of the White Falcon, 1877
- Kingdom of Saxony: Grand Cross of the Albert Order, 1877
- Württemberg: Grand Cross of the Order of the Württemberg Crown, 1892

== Ancestry ==
Ancestors of Bruno, Prince of Ysenburg and Büdingen

8. Ernst Casimir II, Count of Ysenburg and Büdingen
4. Ernst Casimir I, 1st Prince of Ysenburg and Büdingen
9. Countess Eleanore Augusta Amalie of Bentheim-Steinfurt
2. Ernst Casimir II, 2nd Prince of Ysenburg and Büdingen
10. Gustaf Ernst, Count of Erbach-Schönberg
5. Countess Ferdinande of Erbach-Schönberg
11. Countess Henriette Christiane of Stolberg-Stolberg
1. Bruno, 3rd Prince of Ysenburg and Büdingen
12. Albrecht, Count of Erbach-Fürstenau
6. Albrecht, Count of Erbach-Fürstenau
13. Countess Luise of Degenfeld-Schönburg
3. Countess Thekla of Erbach-Fürstenau
14. Friedrich Ludwig, 2nd Prince of Hohenlohe-Oehringen
7. Princess Sophie Emilie Luise of Hohenlohe-Neuenstein-Ingelfingen
15. Countess Marianne of Hoym zu Droyssig

Bruno, Prince of Ysenburg and Büdingen House of Ysenburg-Büdingen Cadet branch of the House of Ysenburg Born: 14 June 1837 Died: 26 January 1906
German nobility
Preceded by Ernst Casimir II	Prince of Ysenburg and Büdingen; 16 February 1861 – 26 January 1906	Succeeded by Wolfgang
