= Hermann, Prince of Solms-Hohensolms-Lich =

German nobleman and politician

Hermann of Solms-Hohensolms-Lich
- Born: 15 April 1838; Brtnice
- Died: 16 September 1899 (aged 61); Lich
- Noble family: Solms-Hohensolms-Lich
- Spouse: Agnes of Stolberg-Wernigerode (m. 1865)
- Issue: Charles, Prince of Solms-Hohensolms-Lich; Eleonore, Grand Duchess of Hesse and by Rhine
- Father: Ferdinand of Solms-Lich-Hohensolms
- Mother: Caroline of Collalto and San Salvatore

Prince Herman Adolf of Solms-Hohensolms-Lich (15 April 1838 in Brtnice – 16 September 1899 in Lich, Hesse) was a German nobleman from the House of Solms-Hohensolms-Lich and a politician.

== Life ==
Hermann was the eldest son of Prince Ferdinand of Solms-Lich-Hohensolms (1806-1876) and his wife Caroline, Countess of Collalto and San Salvatore (1818-1855).

As a Hessian nobleman, Hermann of Solms-Lich-Hohensolms was a member of the first chamber of the Estates of the Grand Duchy of Hesse from 1872 to 1874 and from 1880 until his death in 1899. From 1881 to 1899, he was also a member of the Prussian House of Lords. He also was a member of the parliament of the Prussian Rhine province.

== Marriage and issue ==
He married in 1865 in Janowice Wielkie to Countess Agnes of Stolberg-Wernigerode (1842-1904), a daughter of Prussian General of the Cavalry Count Wilhelm zu Stolberg-Wernigerode. They had seven children:

- Charles (1866-1920), married Princess Emma zu Stolberg-Wernigerode, who succeeded him
- Reinhard Louis (1867-1951) married Countess Marka zu Solms-Sonnenwalde
- Anna Elizabeth (1868-1950) married Count Johannes zu Lynar
- Eleonore (1871-1937) married Ernest Louis, Grand Duke of Hesse
- Marie Mathilde (1873-1953) married Prince Richard zu Dohna-Schlobitten
- Caroline (1877-1958) married Chlodwig, Landgrave of Hesse-Philippsthal-Barchfeld
- Dorothea (1883-1942) married Prince Hermann (1867–1913), son of Prince Otto of Stolberg-Wernigerode

== Honours and awards ==
- Grand Duchy of Hesse:
  - Military Medical Cross, 8 May 1872
  - Grand Cross of the Merit Order of Philip the Magnanimous, 3 March 1880
  - Grand Cross of the Ludwig Order, 21 May 1885
- Kingdom of Prussia:
  - Knight of Honour of the Johanniter Order, 1869; Knight of Justice, 1872
  - Knight of the Order of the Prussian Crown, 3rd Class with Red Cross on Band, 8 August 1872
  - Knight of the Order of the Red Eagle, 2nd Class with Star, 1 September 1884; 1st Class with Crown, 18 January 1893
- Mecklenburg: Grand Cross of the House Order of the Wendish Crown, with Crown in Ore

== Literature ==
- Jochen Lengemann: MdL Hessen 1808-1996, 1996, ISBN 3-7708-1071-6, p. 361
