= Casimir Johannes, Prince of Sayn-Wittgenstein-Berleburg =

German nobleman and politician

Casimir Johannes Prinz zu Sayn-Wittgenstein-Berleburg
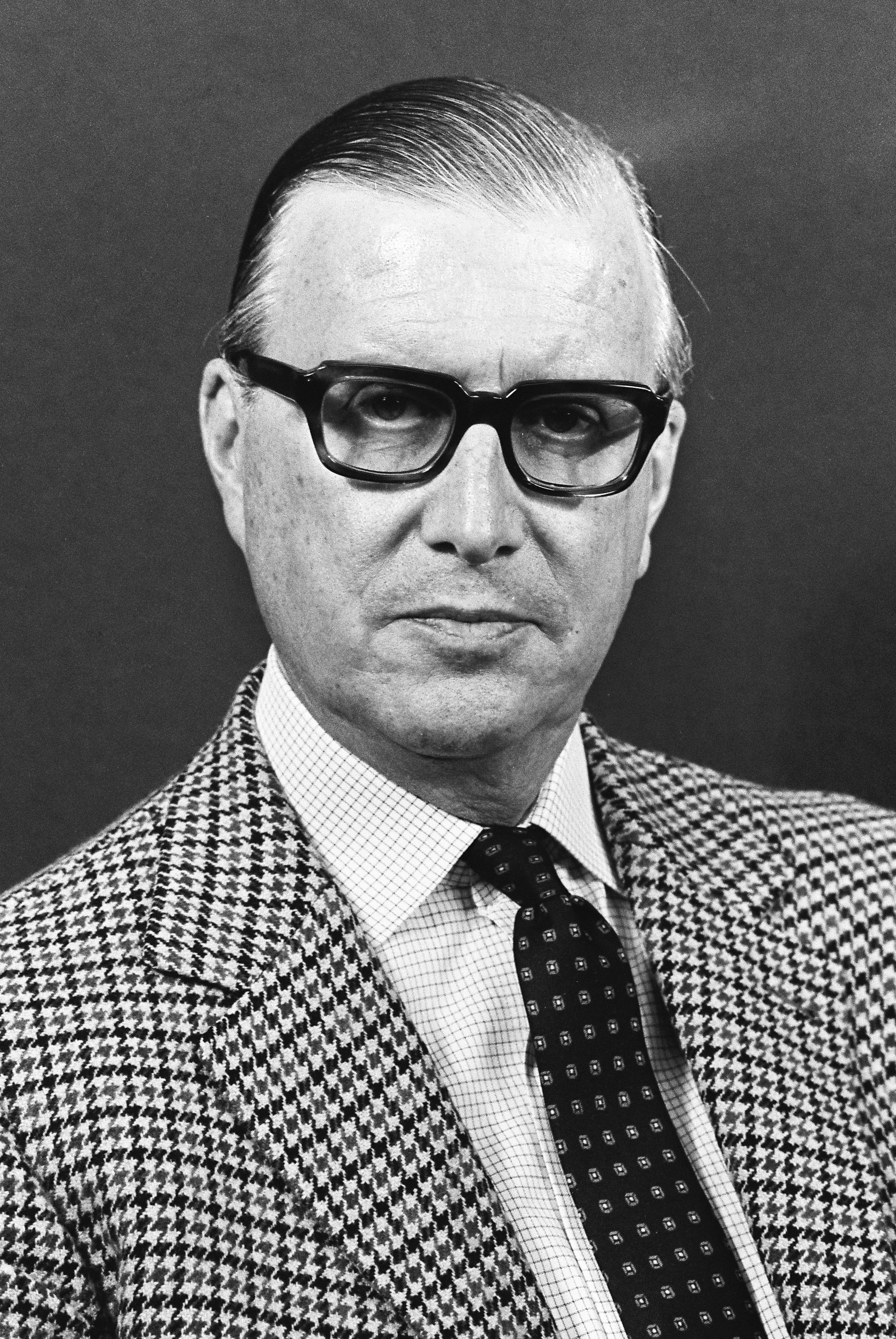

Member of the European Parliament for West Germany
- In office 17 July 1979 – 1983

Personal details
- Born: 22 January 1917 Frankfurt, German Empire
- Died: 21 February 2010 (aged 93) Hamburg, Germany
- Party: CDU
- Relations: Sayn-Wittgenstein-Berleburg

Casimir Johannes Ludwig Otto, Prince of Sayn-Wittgenstein-Berleburg (22 January 1917 – 21 February 2010) was a German nobleman, businessman and politician from the Christian Democratic Union. He was Member of the European Parliament from 1979 to 1983.

== Political career ==
Sayn-Wittgenstein-Berleburg was CDU treasurer during the CDU donations scandal.

== Family ==
He was stepson of Richard Merton and father-in-law of Wolfgang-Ernst, Prince of Ysenburg and Büdingen.

== See also ==
- List of members of the European Parliament (1979–1984)
- List of members of the European Parliament for West Germany, 1979–1984
