= Wolfgang-Ernst, Prince of Ysenburg and Büdingen =

German prince

Wolfgang-Ernst
- Prince of Ysenburg and Büdingen
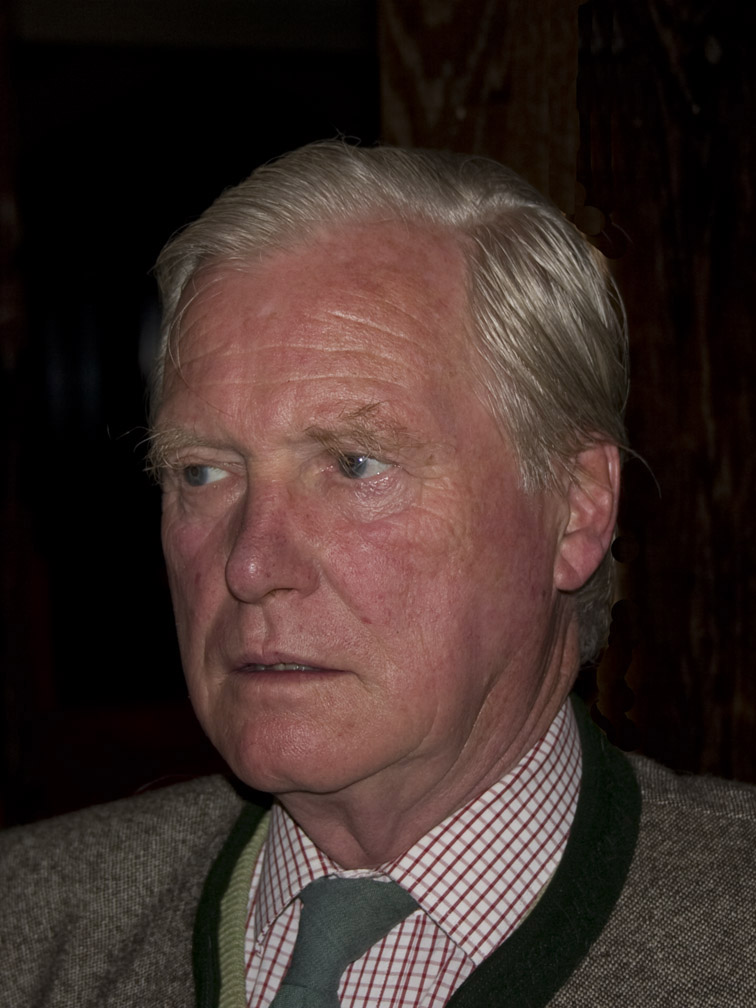

Head of the House Ysenburg and Büdingen
- Reign: 25 September 1990 - present
- Predecessor: Otto Frederik, 7th Prince of Ysenburg-Büdingen
- Born: 20 June 1936 (age 90); Frankfurt
- Spouse: Princess Leonille of Sayn-Wittgenstein-Berleburg (m. 1967)
- Issue: Casimir Alexander, Hereditary Prince of Ysenburg and Büdingen; Ferdinand Maximilian; Felizitas
- House: Isenburg
- Father: Otto Frederik, 7th Prince of Ysenburg-Büdingen
- Mother: Princess Felizitas Maria of Reuss-Kostritz

Wolfgang-Ernst Ferdinand Heinrich Franz Karl Georg Wilhelm, VIII. Prince of Ysenburg and Büdingen in Wächtersbach (born 20 June 1936 in Frankfurt am Main) is a German aristocrat. He is currently head of the House of Ysenburg and Büdingen.

From 1992 to 2008 he was the president of the Automobilclub von Deutschland (AvD). He holds a degree in business administration ("Diplom-Kaufmann") and was responsible for the private clients transactions of the DG-Bank for many years.

== Family ==
Wolfgang-Ernst is the first of five children of His Serene Highness, Otto-Friedrich III. Friedrich Viktor Ferdinand Maximilian Gustav Richard Bogislav, Prince of Ysenburg and Büdingen, and Her Serene Highness Felicitas Anna Eleonore Cecilie, née Princess Reuss zu Köstritz. In 1967, he married Leonille Elisabeth Victoria Barbara Margarete Princess of Sayn-Wittgenstein-Berleburg, the daughter of Casimir Johannes, Prince of Sayn-Wittgenstein-Berleburg who was the bursar of the leading German political party, CDU. They have three children and live at Büdingen Castle.

Children:

- Casimir Alexander, Hereditary Prince of Ysenburg and Büdingen (b. 1967), m. Alexandra Maria, Countess von Bernstorff (b. 1977)
  - Tristan-Alexander (b. 2014)
- Ferdinand Maximilian (b. 1969), m. Sophie de Bois (b. 1970)
  - Madeleine (b. 2004)
  - Tassilo-Alexander (b. 2006)
- Felizitas (b. 1980)

== President of the AvD ==
In May 1992, he was elected unsalaried president of the AvD as the successor of Paul Alfons von Metternich-Winneburg. During his term of office, the company developed into a service company and significantly expanded its services. In 1999, the club celebrated its 100th birthday. After the suspicion could not be eliminated at a special meeting of the club on 6 April 2008, he resigned on June 1, 2008. This followed investigations by the public prosecutor Frankfurt were on suspicion of disloyalty to the detriment of the club members.

== Economic downfall ==
In 1990, Wolfgang Ernst took on the extensive business enterprises of the house by his father Otto Friedrich Prince of Ysenburg. In the following period, due to failed investments and speculation, there was a financial collapse and a large part of the Princely property had to be sold. In 2005 at the district court Friedberg an insolvency proceeding on the forest enterprise of the Princely house was opened. The 8500-hectare forest of Büdingen – one of the largest private forest properties in Hesse – could be sold to an investor, but this has not alleviated the financial problems of the prince. Back in 2001, a tradition since 1578 Princely brewery was sold in Waechtersbach at the Würzburg Hofbräuhaus. 2005 was followed by the sale of the 175-year-old Waechtersbacher Keramik which was soon bankrupt. At the same time appeared cultural goods, such as ancient manuscripts and folios on from the possession of the house in the auction trade. 2011 reported the family company, Beteiligungsgesellschaft Fürst zu Ysenburg und Büdingen GmbH & Co., whose managing director Wolfgang-Ernst was, was also in bankruptcy.

He had to sell most of his estates, including Wächtersbach Castle, but kept Büdingen Castle and in 2010 repurchased Ronneburg Castle.

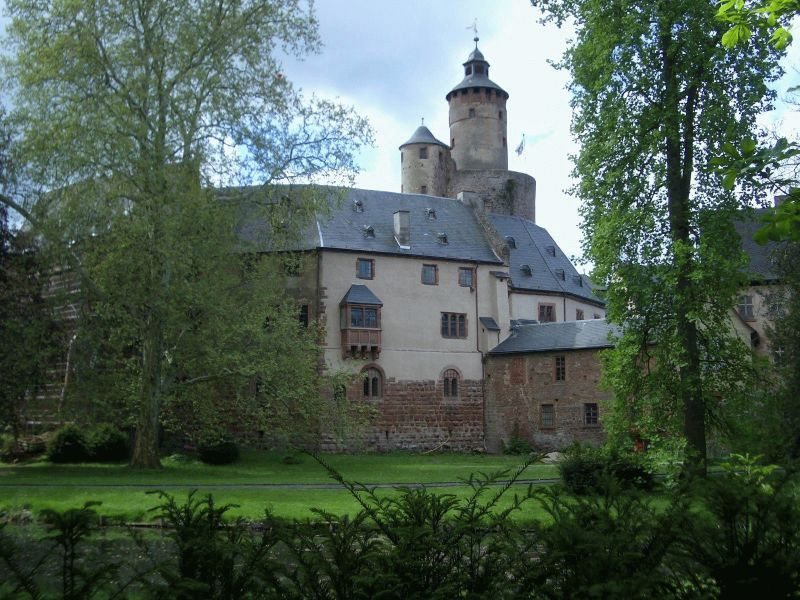
Büdingen Castle

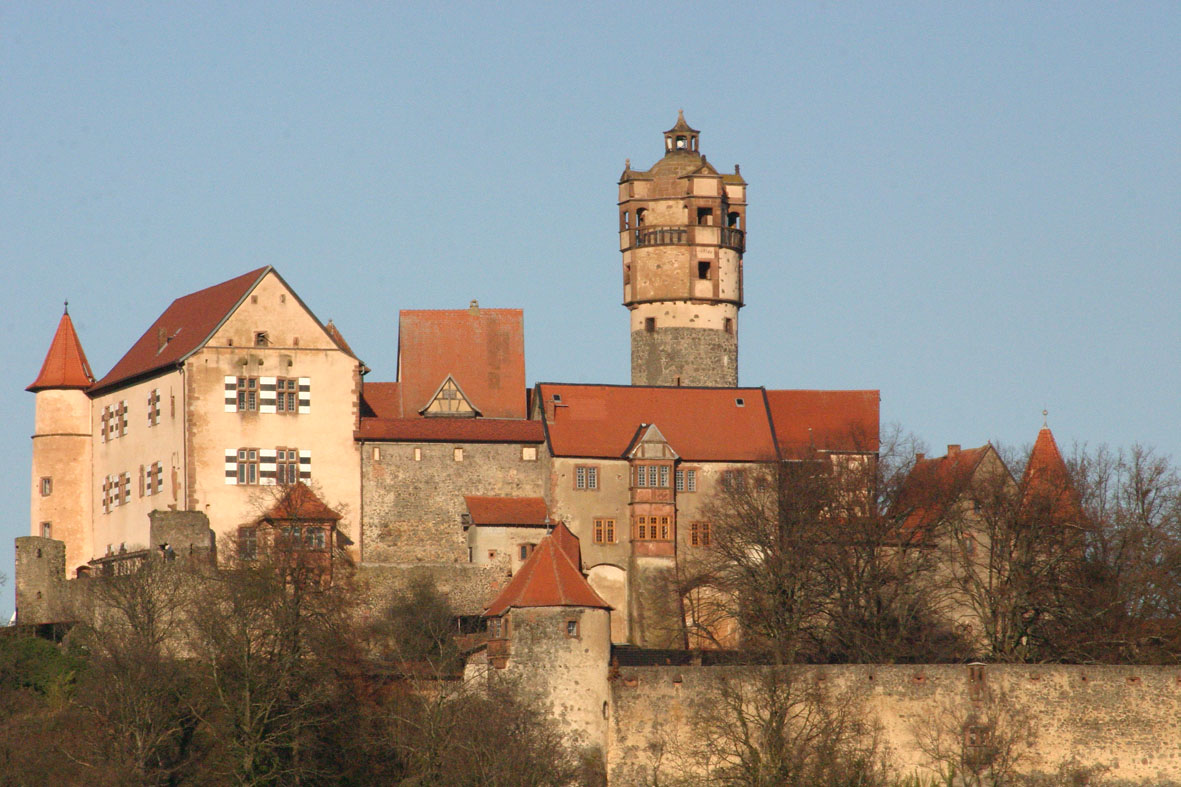
Ronneburg Castle

== Investigation ==
As head of the family of the house Ysenburg and Büdingen, Wolfgang Ernst acts as director of the foundation "Präsenz zu Büdingen", owning two churches (including the Church of St. Mary) and the cemetery of Büdingen town. The foundation is obliged to conserve these buildings. During his tenure there were transfers of assets within which Wolfgang Ernst graduated in two properties agreements with himself. The Evangelical Church in Hesse and Nassau accused him of having acted to the detriment of the Foundation and in favor of the ailing family fortune and requested the President of the Government in Darmstadt in April 2012 to dismiss Wolfgang-Ernst as the foundation trustee. The prosecution of Gießen started investigations on grounds of a suspicion of infidelity.

== Honors and work ==
In 2001, Ysenburg and Büdingen was awarded the first class of the Order of Merit of the Federal Republic of Germany for his volunteer work. He is the president of the Foundation "Mathilden-Hospital", and engaged himself in the Förderverein Collegium musicum in Mainz, in the direction of the club Freunde der Universität Mainz. Ysenburg and Büdingen is president of the EuropaChorAkademie. In his AvD time he awarded the trophy of the German Grand Prix.
