= Solms-Hohensolms-Lich =

Principality in the Land of Hessen, Germany

County (Principality) of Solms-Hohensolms-Lich Grafschaft (Fürstentum) Solms-Hohensolms-Lich
- 1718–1806
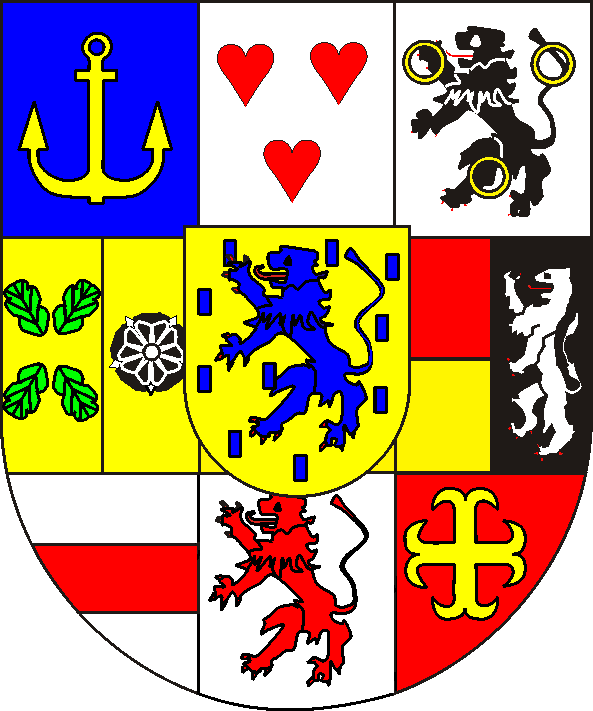
- Coat of arms
- Status: State of the Holy Roman Empire
- Capital: Lich
- Government: Principality
- Historical era: Middle Ages
  - Union of S-Hohensolms and Solms-Lich: 1718
  - Raised to principality: 1792
  - Mediatised to Austria, Hesse, Prussia and Württemberg: 1806
Preceded by
County of Solms	Solms-Hohensolms
County of Solms	Solms-Lich
Succeeded by
Archduchy of Austria
Grand Duchy of Hesse
Kingdom of Prussia
Kingdom of Württemberg

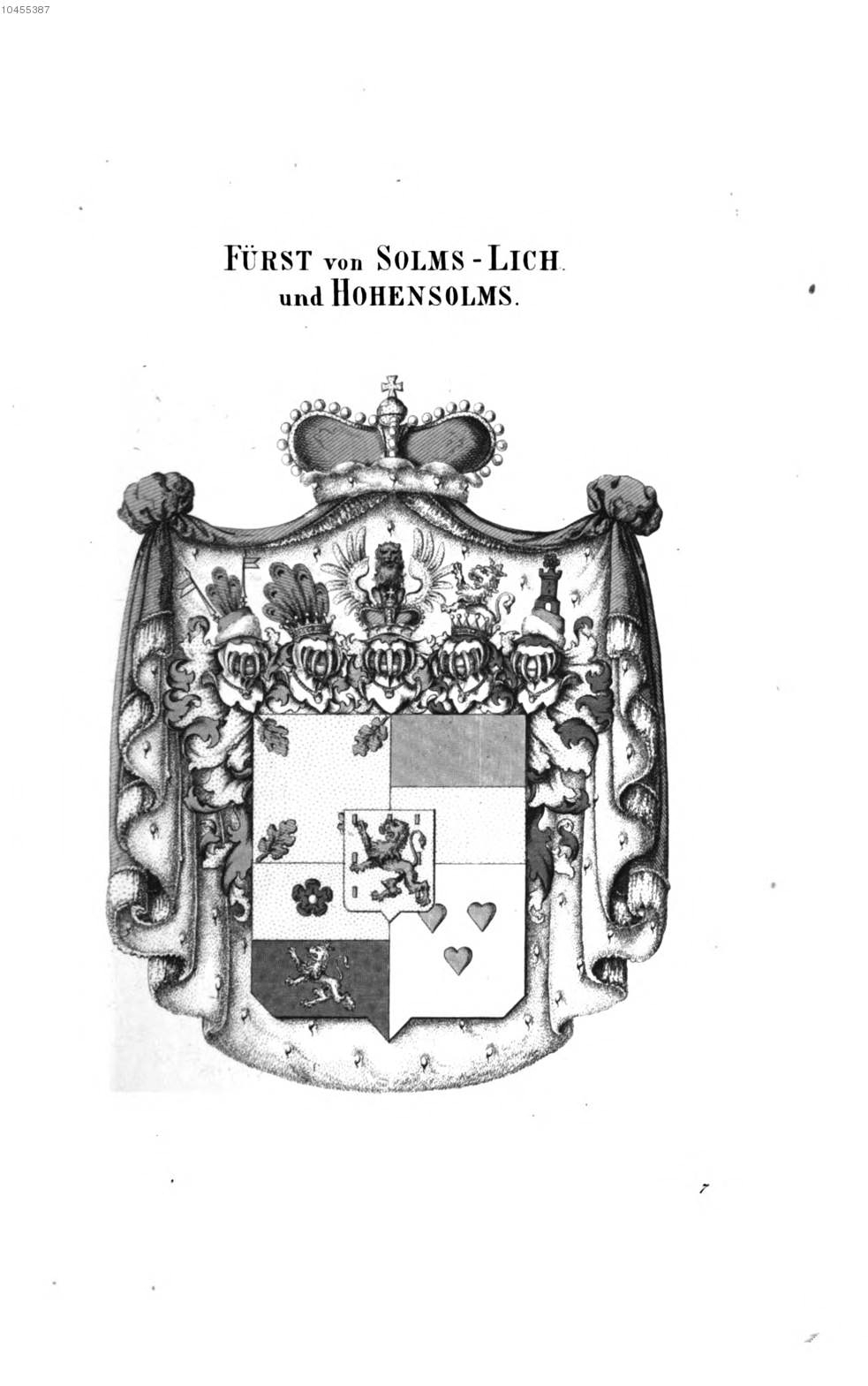
Arms: Princes of Solms-Hohensolms-Lich

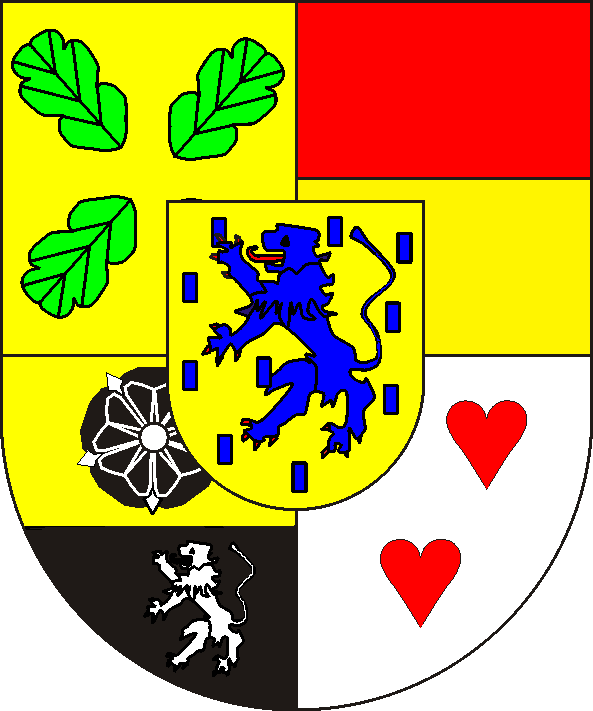
Coat of arms of Solms-Hohensolms-Lich

Solms-Hohensolms-Lich was at first a County and later Principality with Imperial immediacy in what is today the federal Land of Hessen, Germany. It was ruled by a branch of the House of Solms, originally from Solms.

== Imperial county ==
The Imperial county was originally created in 1718 as a union of the counties of Solms-Hohensolms and Solms-Lich for Count Friedrich Wilhelm zu Solms-Hohensolms-Lich (1682-1744). It existed from 1718 until 1792.

Hohensolms was an old territory of the lords and counts of Solms, with Alt-Hohensolms Castle built in 1321 and destroyed in 1349, and Neu-Hohensolms Castle built in 1350. The latter was owned by the princely family until 1969.

The county of Lich was inherited by the Counts of Solms-Braunfels after the Counts of Falkenstein-Münzenberg died out in 1418, resulting in strong territorial growth of the House of Solms in the Wetterau, including the lordships of Münzenberg Castle, Hungen Castle, Lich Castle and Laubach Castle. Shortly thereafter, the branch of Solms-Lich split off from Solms-Braunfels.

== Principality ==
It was raised to a Principality of the Holy Roman Empire in 1792 for Prince Karl Christian zu Solms-Hohensolms-Lich (1725-1803). Solms-Hohensolms-Lich was mediatised to Austria, Hesse-Darmstadt, Prussia and Württemberg in 1806. The House of Solms had its origins at Solms, Hesse. On 2 February 1905 in Darmstadt, Princess Eleonore of Solms-Hohensolms-Lich married her childhood sweetheart, Ernest Louis, Grand Duke of Hesse as his second wife.

The Prince of Solms-Hohensolms-Lich still resides at Castle Lich in Lich.

== Rulers of Solms-Hohensolms-Lich ==
The House of Solms-Hohensolms-Lich is a Hessian princely family, and a collateral line of the House of Solms-Braunfels. The House of Solms-Hohensolms-Lich originally were imperial counts, raised to the rank of Imperial Prince in 1792.

=== Counts of Solms-Hohensolms-Lich (1718–1792) ===
- Friedrich Wilhelm, Count 1718–44 (1682-1744)
  - Charles Christian, Count 1744–92 (1725-1803), created Reichsfürst 1792

=== Princes of Solms-Hohensolms-Lich (1792–present) ===
- Charles Christian, 1st Prince 1792–1803 (1725-1803) ∞ 1759 Sophie Charlotte, Countess of Dohna-Schlobitten
  - Charles Louis Augustus, 2nd Prince 1803–1807 (1762-1807) - Mediatized in 1806; ∞ 1802 Henrietta Sophie, Countess of Bentheim-Steinfurt
    - Charles, 3rd Prince 1807-1824 (1803-1824)
    - Ludwig, 4th Prince 1824-1880 (1805-1880); ∞ 1829 Marie, princess of Isenburg-Büdingen
    - Prince Ferdinand (1806-1876)
      - Hermann, 5th Prince 1880-1899 (1838-1899); Agnes, Countess of Stolberg-Wernigerode
        - Charles, 6th Prince 1899-1920 (1866-1920); ∞ 1894 Emma, Princess of Stolberg-Wernigerode
        - Reinhard Louis, 7th Prince 1920-1951 (1867-1951); ∞ 1898 Marka Clara, Countess of Solms-Sonnewalde
          - Hermann Otto, Hereditary Prince (1902-1940); ∞ 1933 Gertrud, Baroness of Werthern-Beichlingen
            - Philipp-Reinhard, 8th Prince 1951-2015 (1934-2015); ∞ 1974 Marie, Countess Fouché d’Otrante
              - Carl-Christian, 9th Prince 2015–present (born 1975); ∞ 2009 Christina, Countess of Douglas-Langenstein
                - Louis Clemens Jamal, Hereditary Prince (born 2008)
              - Prince Louis Philip (born 1978)
              - Prince Frederik Sebastian (born 1987)
            - Prince Wilhelm (1937-2024) ∞ Milicent von Boch-Galhau (b.1937)
              - Prince Benedict (born 1965)
              - Prince Christian-Lucius (born 1974)
                - Prince Maximilian
            - Prince Hermann Otto (born 1940) ∞ Margit Mayer (b.1944) div. 1971 ∞ Christiane Meyer zu Eissen (b. 1955)

== Gallery ==
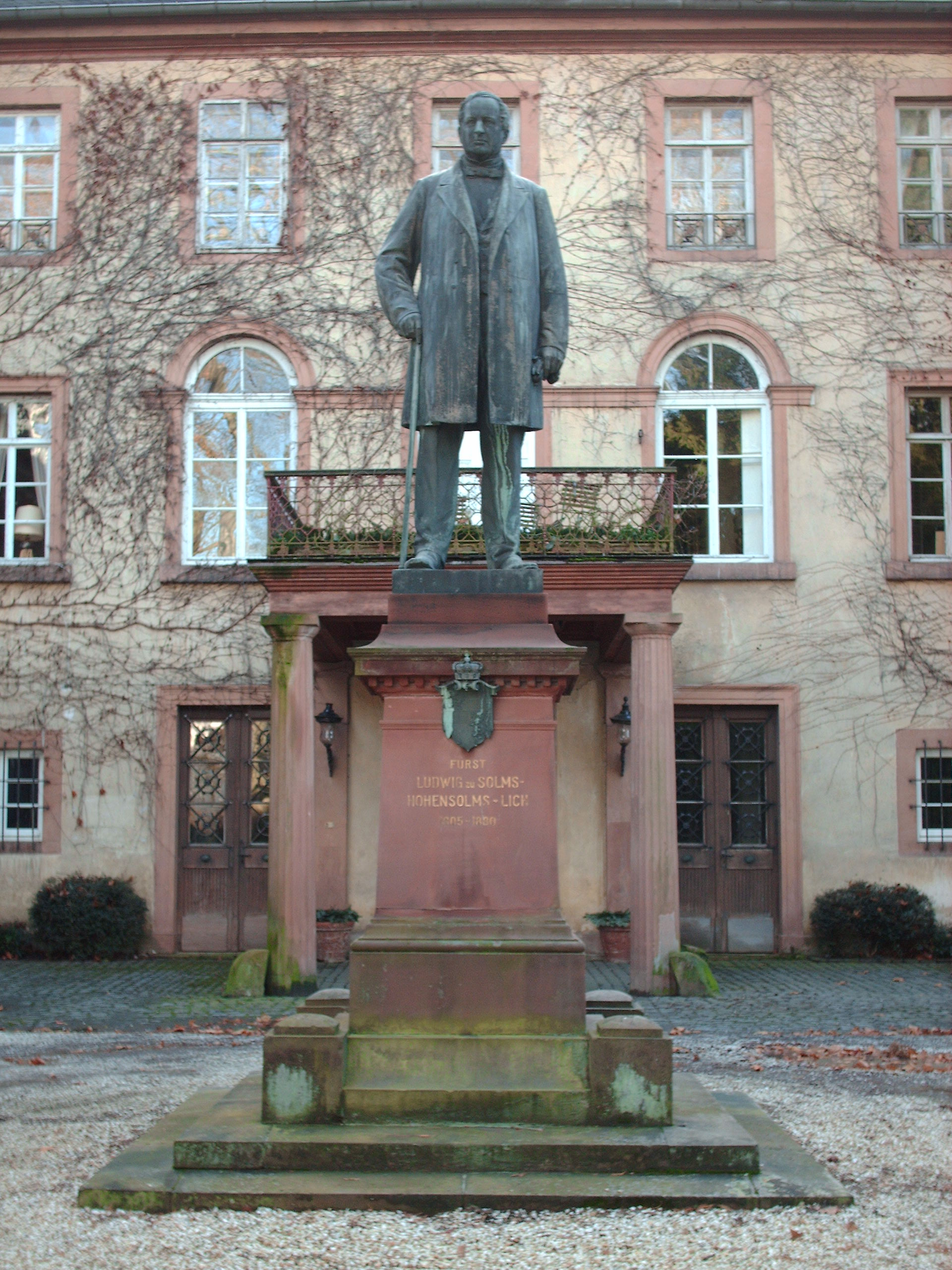
Monument of Prince Ludwig zu Solms-Hohensolms-Lich outside Lich Castle

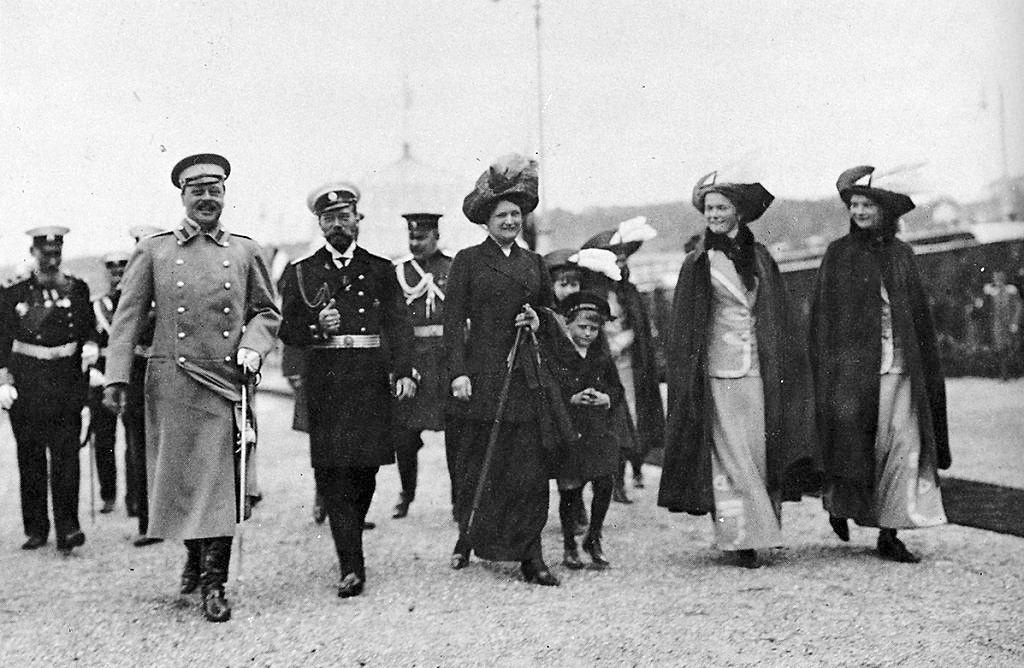
Photo of Eleonore Solms-Hohensolms-Lich and her husband Ernst Ludwig, Grand Duke of Hesse with brother-in-law Tsar Nicolas II and nieces Anastasia, Olga and Tatiana

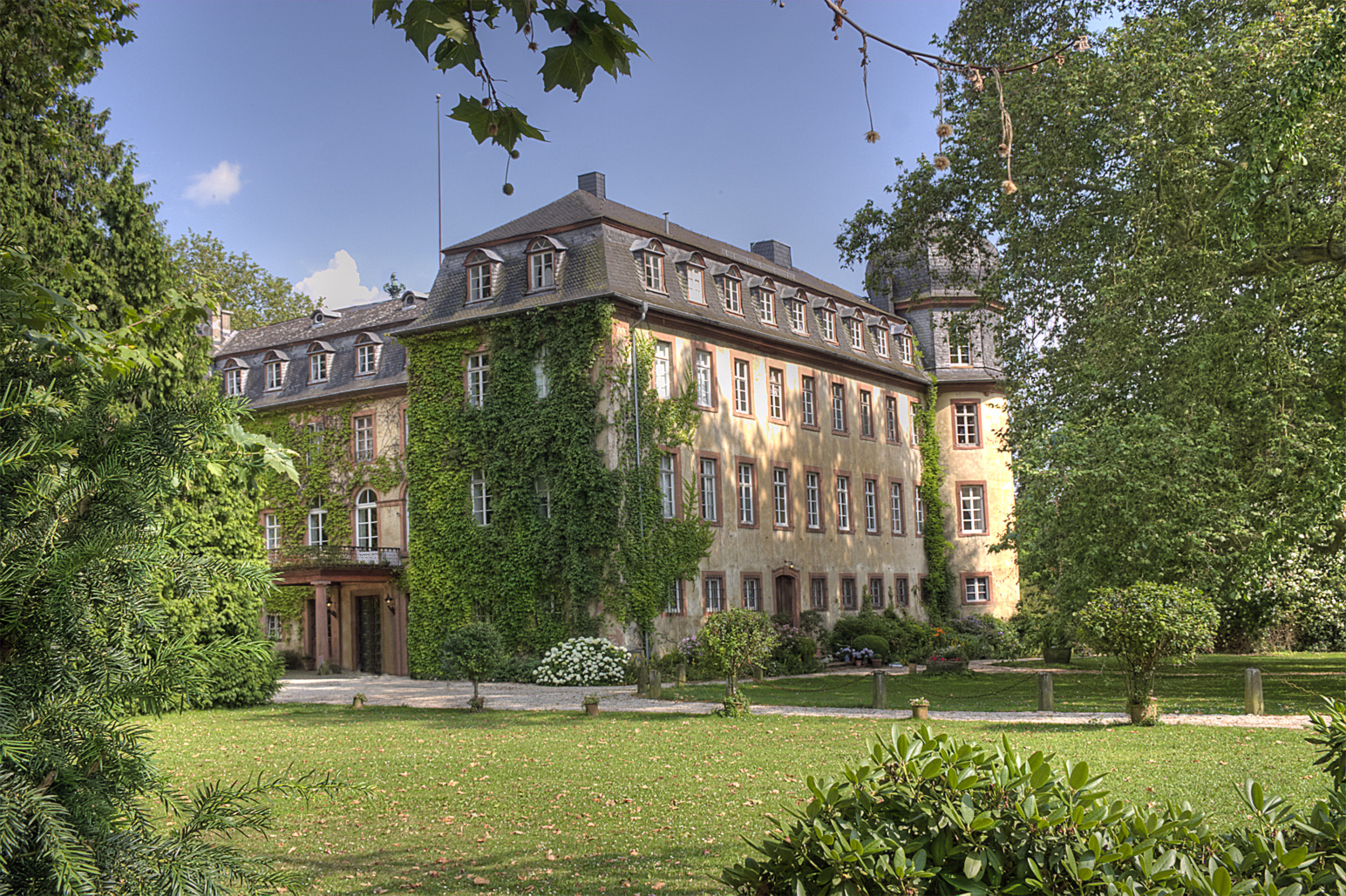
The princely castle at Lich, Hesse
