= Lich, Hesse =

Lich
- Town
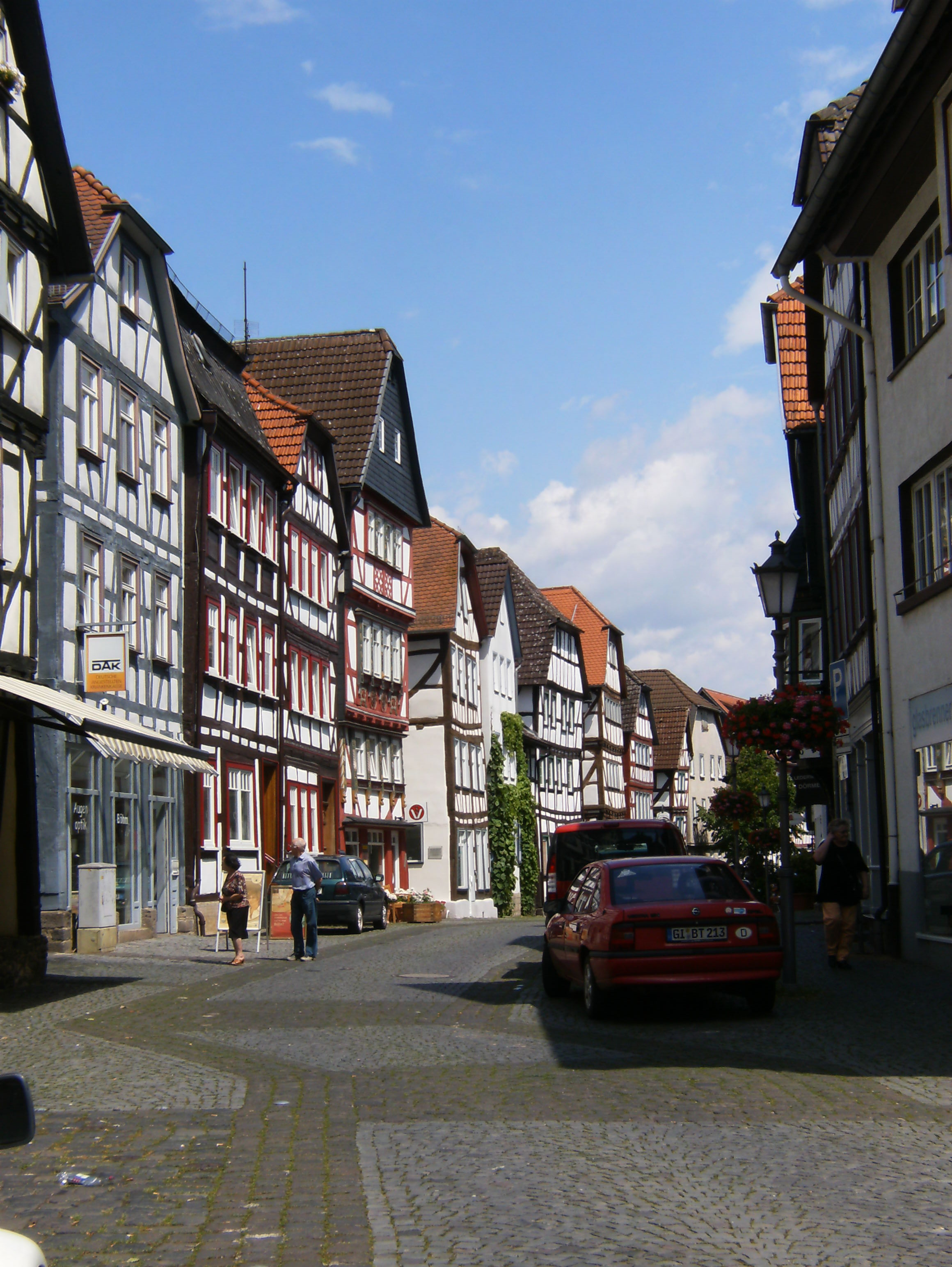
- Late medieval framework buildings in Oberstadt road

- Coat of arms

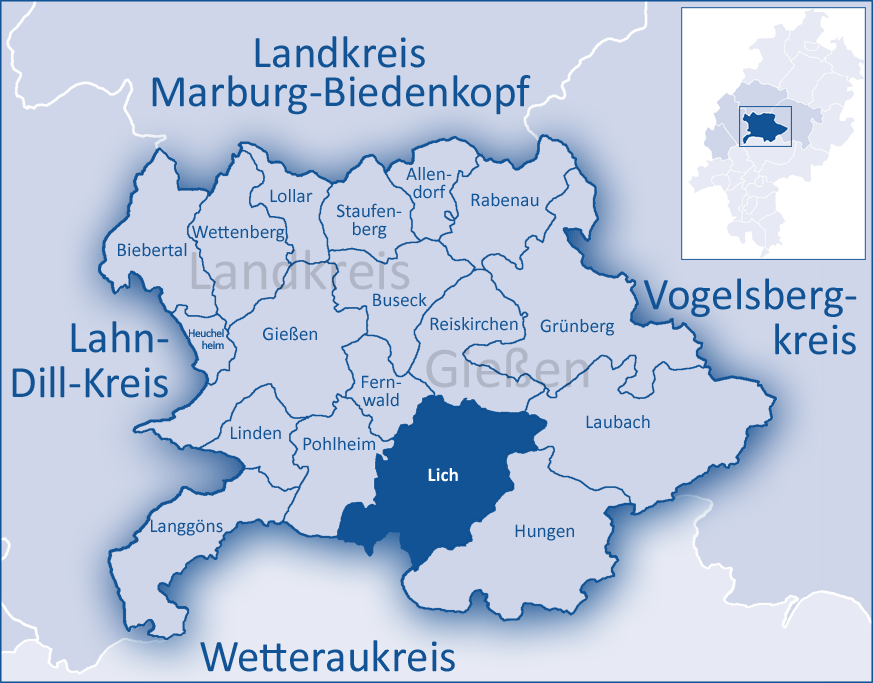
- Location of Lich within Gießen district
- Interactive map of Lich
- Location within Germany Location within Hesse
- Coordinates: 50°31′18″N 8°49′15″E
- Country: Germany
- State: Hesse
- Admin. region: Gießen
- District: Gießen
- Subdivisions: 9 Stadtbezirke

Government
  - Mayor (2019–25): Julien Neubert

Area
  - Total: 77.61 km^{2} (29.97 sq mi)
- Elevation: 177 m (581 ft)

Population (2025-12-31)
  - Total: 14,193
  - Density: 182.9/km^{2} (473.6/sq mi)
- Time zone: UTC+01:00 (CET)
  - Summer (DST): UTC+02:00 (CEST)
- Postal codes: 35423
- Dialling codes: 06404, 06004
- Vehicle registration: GI
- Website: www.lich.de

Lich (German pronunciation: [lɪç]) is a town in the district of Gießen, in Hesse, Germany. It is situated 12 km southeast of Gießen. Lich has a population of around 13,000.

== Geography ==
=== Location ===
The town is located on the river Wetter halfway between Taunus and Vogelsberg; the northern and eastern parts of the town reside within the natural area of the Vogelsberg, the southern and western in the Wetterau.

=== Constituent communities ===
Besides the main town, which bears the same name as the whole municipality, the following surrounding communities belong to Lich since the Gebietsreformen (administrative reorganization) of the 1970s:

- Bettenhausen
- Birklar
- Eberstadt
- Arnsburg Abbey
- Langsdorf
- Muschenheim
- Nieder-Bessingen
- Ober-Bessingen

== History ==
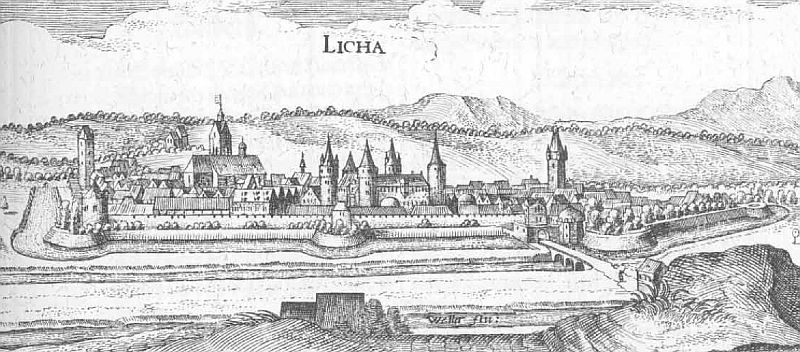
Lich in the Topographia Hassiae from Matthäus Merian 1655

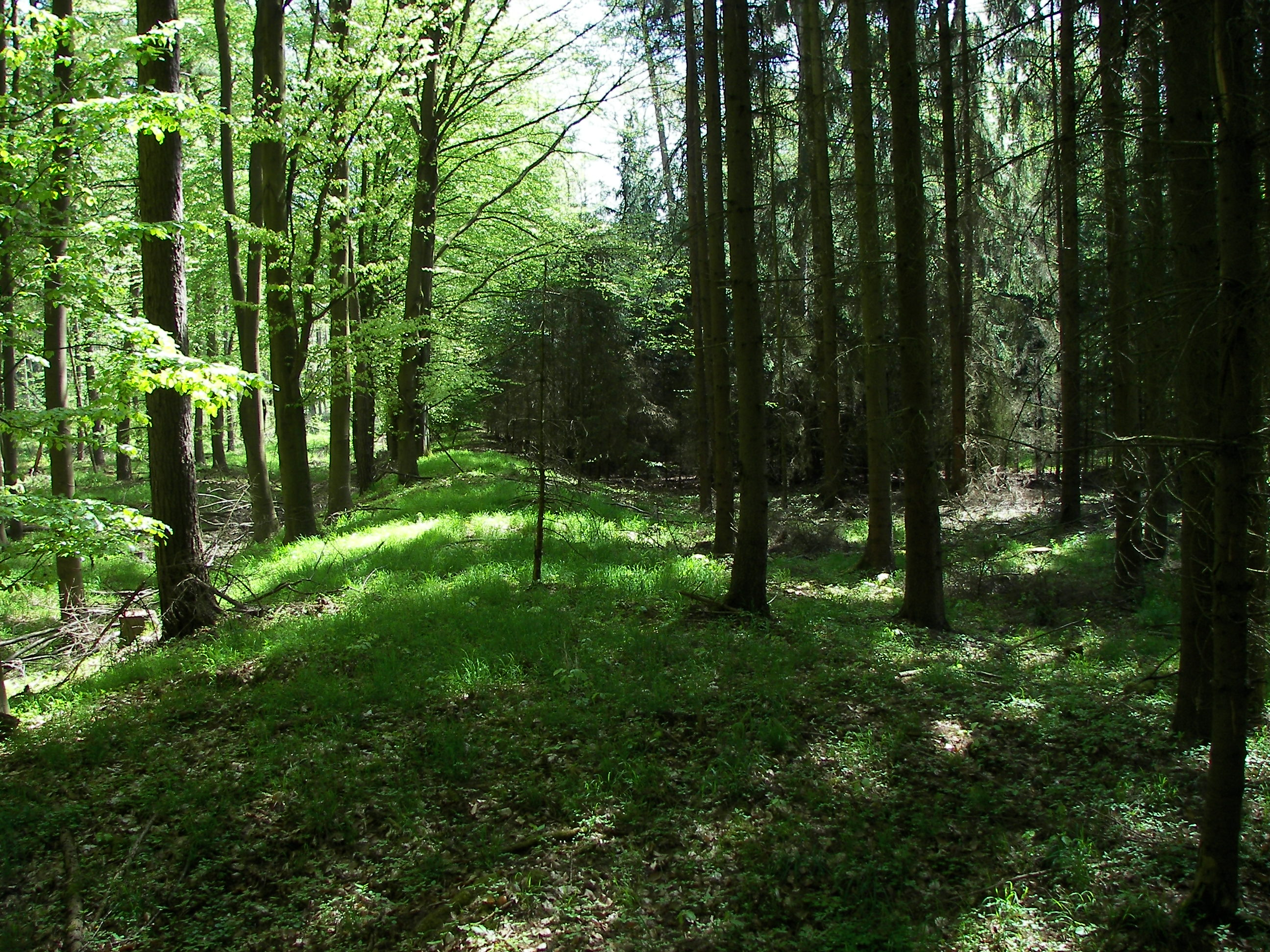
Remnants of the limes near Lich

The region is known to have been settled for more than 100,000 years. Tools found in several places in and around Lich were dated to the Neanderthal period, others to the Aurignacian culture, Linear Pottery culture, the Bronze Age, the Hallstatt culture and the La Tène culture.

When building the Upper Germanic limes during the reign of the Roman Emperor Domitian the Romans built the Castrum Arnsburg, located near what is now Arnsburg Abbey. It is the most northeastern known full-sized castrum along the limes.

The first known mentioning of Lich dates back to 790 in the Lorsch codex. In 1300 the town was awarded market rights by Emperor Albert I of Germany. Originally belonging to the County of Hagen-Münzenberg it became the property of the Counts of Falkenstein following the marriage of Isengard of Münzenberg to Philip IV of Bolanden-Falkenstein. As an inheritance Lich was given to the House of Solms in the middle of the 14th century. The House of Solms split into several branches over the centuries – one of them the branch Solms-Hohensolms-Lich, which retains its seat in Lich.

There was no significant destruction in Lich during several wars from Thirty Years' War up to World War II. In 1993, the town hosted the 33rd Hessentag state festival.

== Governance ==
=== Town twinning ===
Lich is twinned with the following communities:

- Dieulefit in France
- Tangermünde in Saxony-Anhalt, Germany
- Budakeszi in Hungary
- Vänersborg in Sweden

It is also associated with:

- Tata in Morocco

== Landmarks ==
- Town centre, made up largely of half-timbered buildings. The most notable is the Textorhaus with its richly carved façade, today hosting the town museum.
- Late Gothic Marienstiftskirche (St Mary's collegiate church) with grave plates and a Baroque pulpit.
- Some parts of the town wall remain. Of the former fortifications the Town Tower (height 48 meters) and the Town Gate are still extant, built at the beginning of the 14th century.
- Castle Lich of the Fürsten (Princes) of Solms-Hohensolms-Lich in late Renaissance and Baroque style, surrounded by a public park.
- Former Cistercian Arnsburg Abbey, about five kilometers southwest of Lich.
- Ober-Bessingen has one of the few remaining Gatehouses.
- Kino Traumstern (cinema) is one of the leading arthouse cinemas of Hesse; it has received several Hessian and German cultural prices over the years.

== Education ==
There are three elementary schools, a comprehensive school, a special school for children with learning disabilities and a nursing school associated to the Asklepios Klinik Lich. The Gießen district Volkshochschule is also located in Lich.

== Economy ==
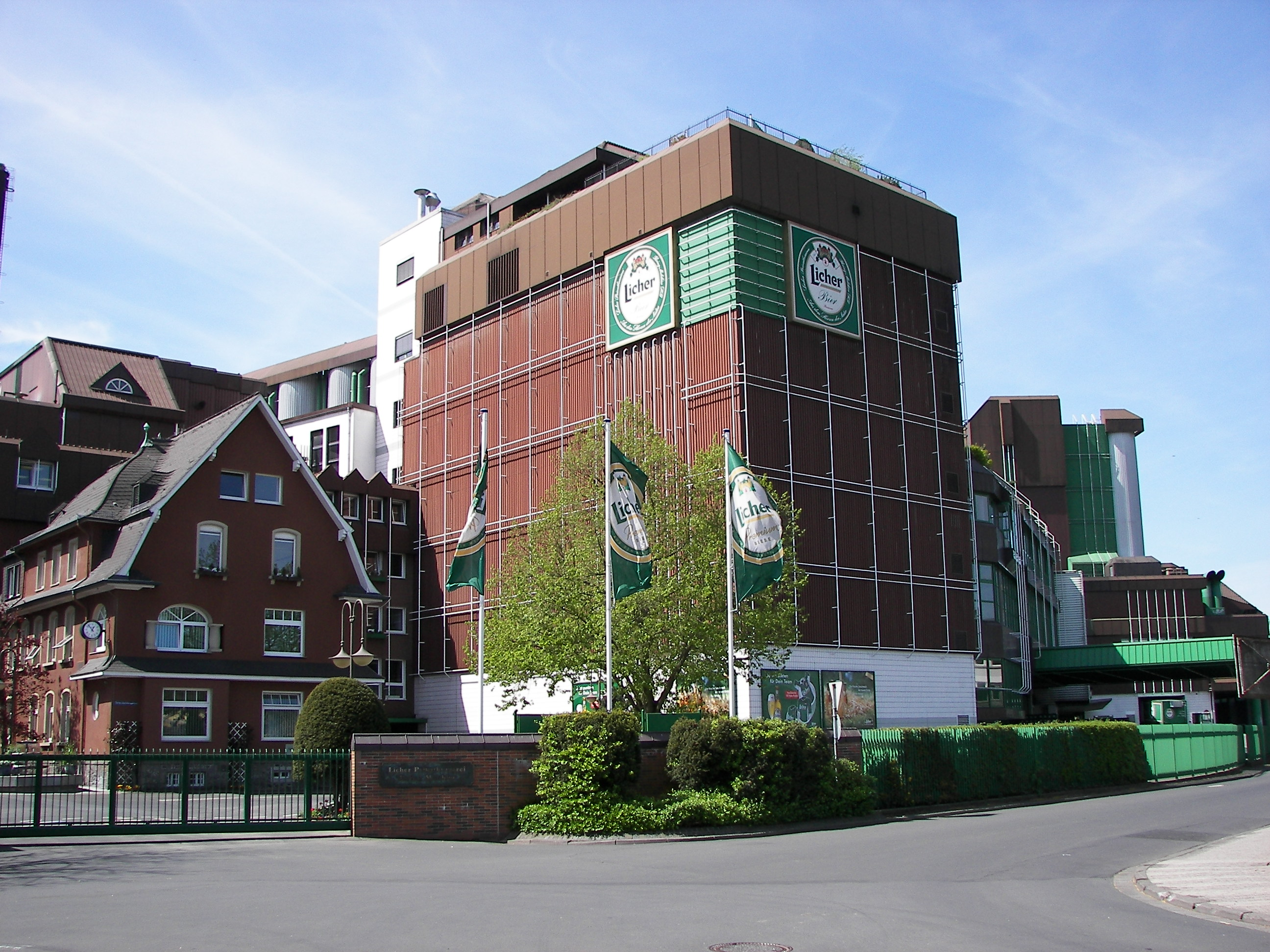
The Licher brewery.

Lich is the home of the brewery and leading regional brand Licher (part of Bitburger Holding). The town also has more than 400 years of tradition in organ building, today represented by the Förster & Nicolaus Orgelbauanstalt and the Otto Heuss GmbH. The Hofapotheke (Court Pharmacy) was founded in 1703.

== Gallery ==
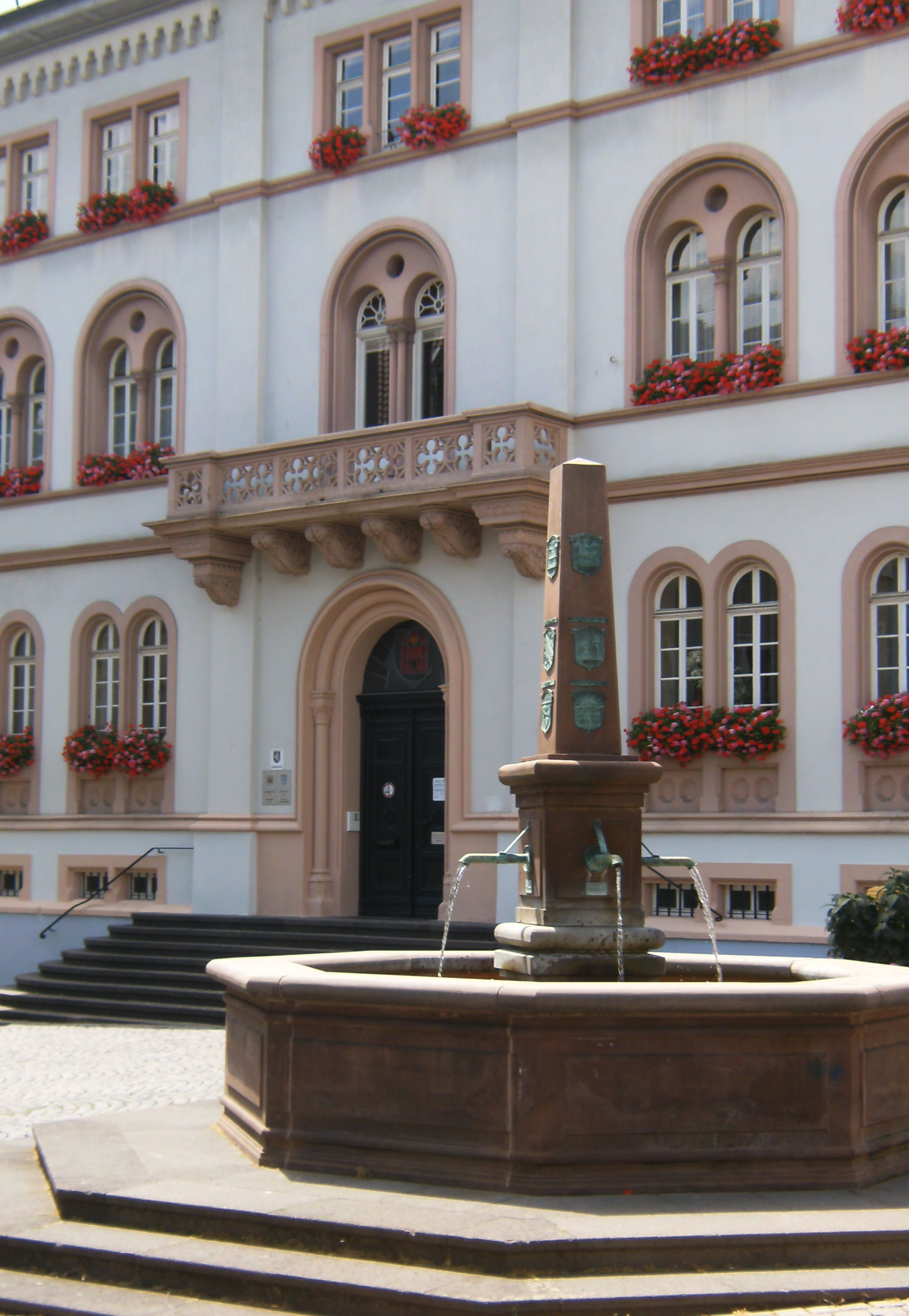
Town hall and market fountain

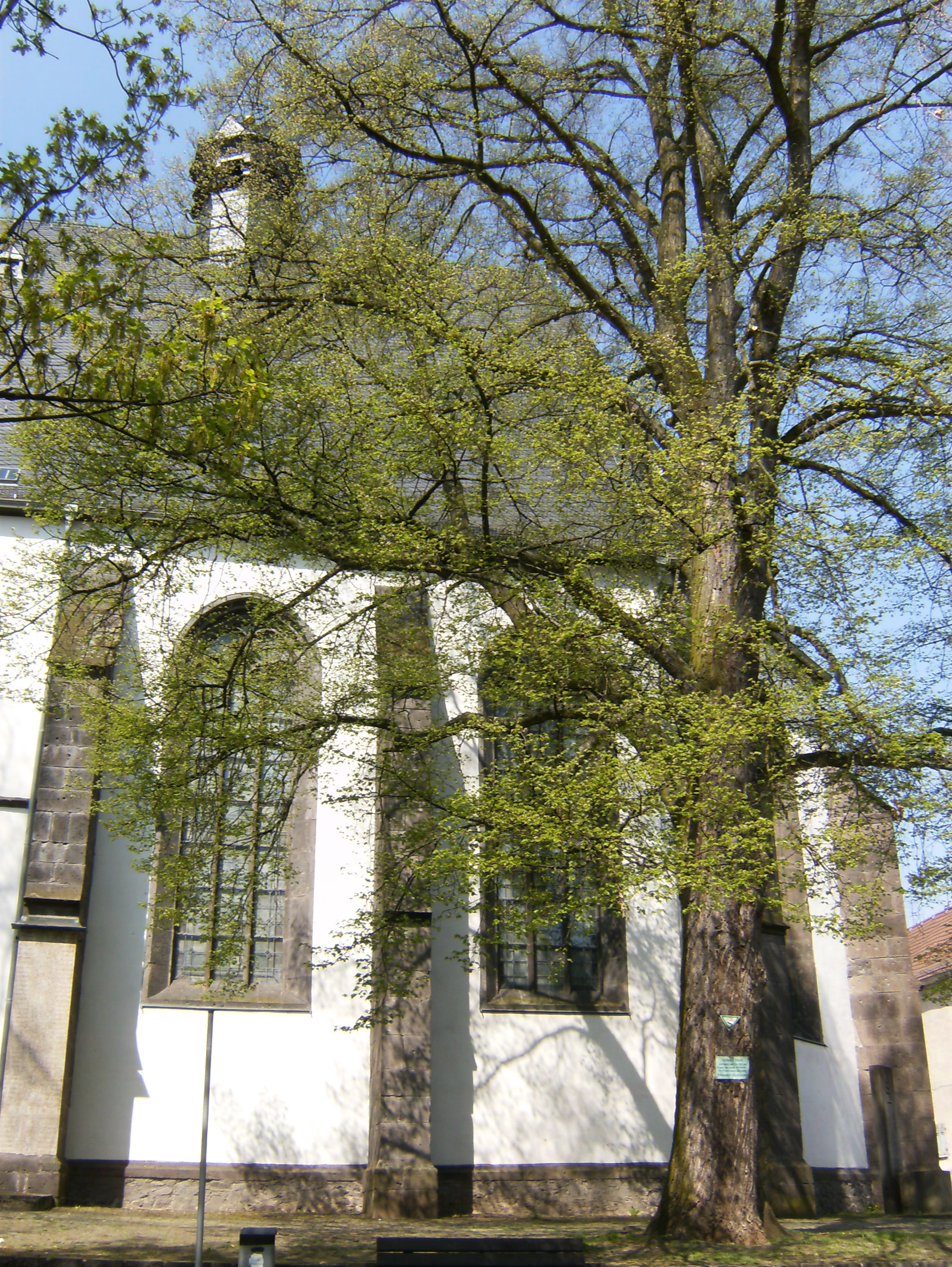
The Marienstiftskirche

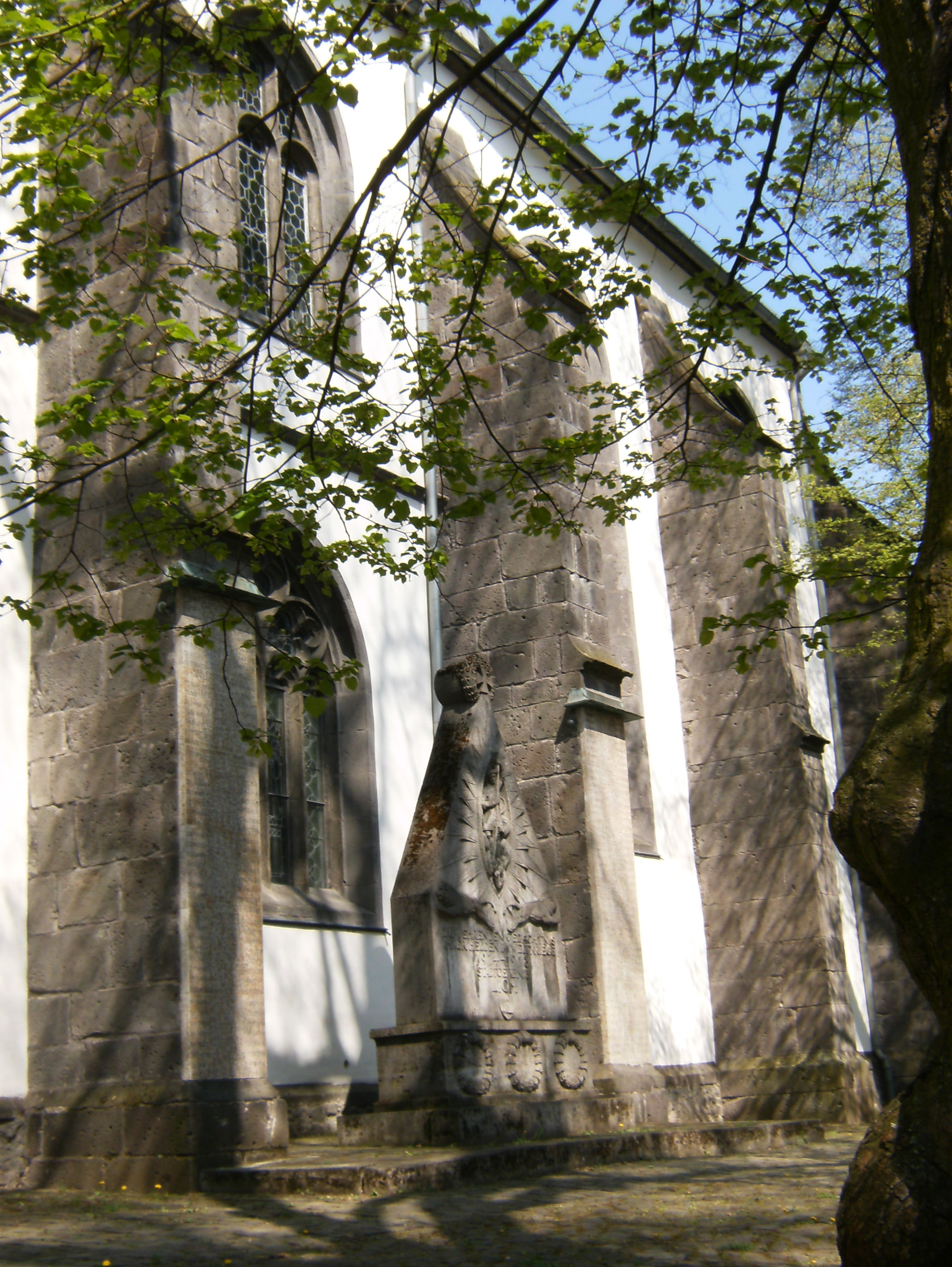
The Marienstiftskirche

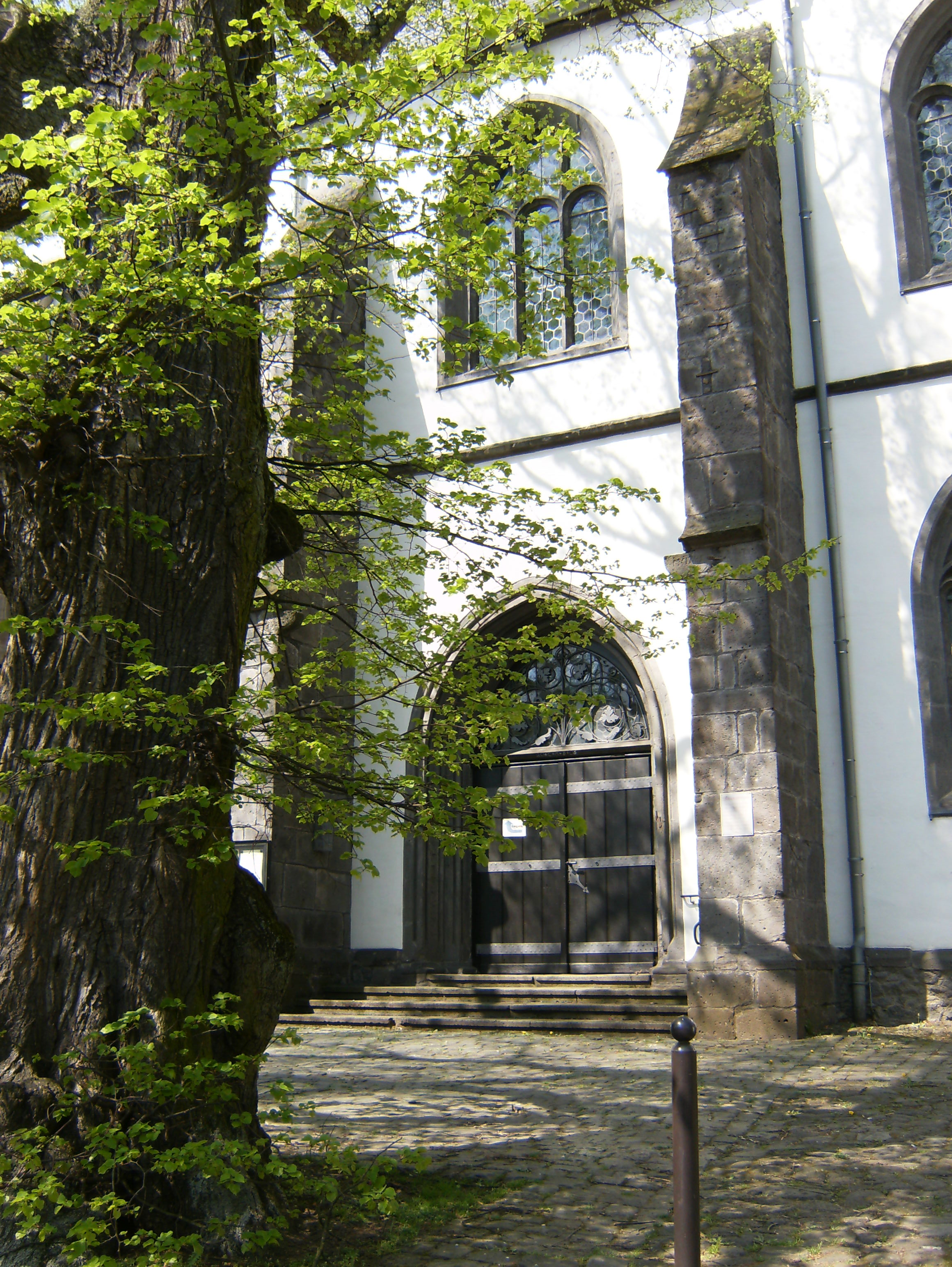
Main portal of the Marienstiftskirche

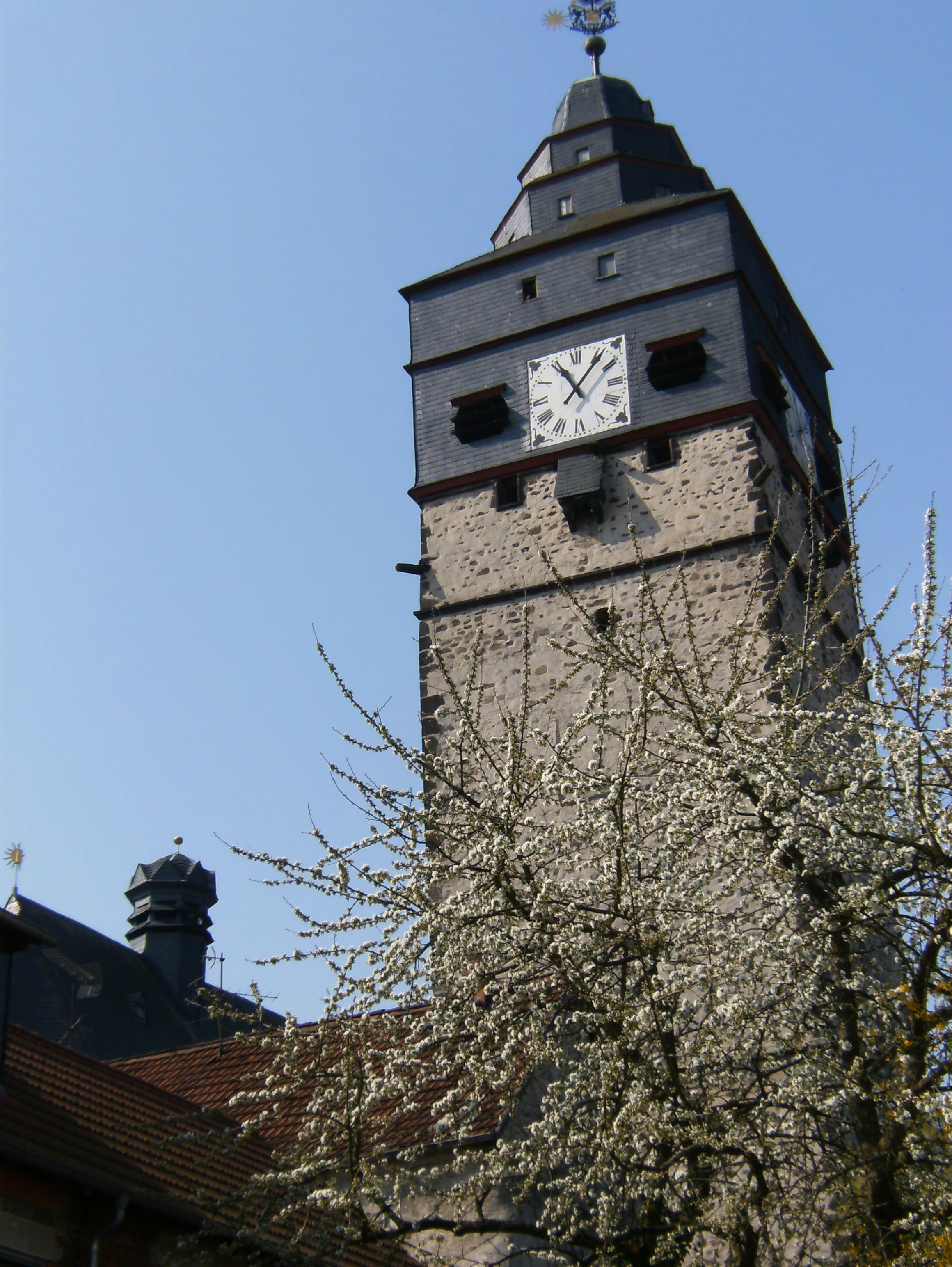
The town tower.

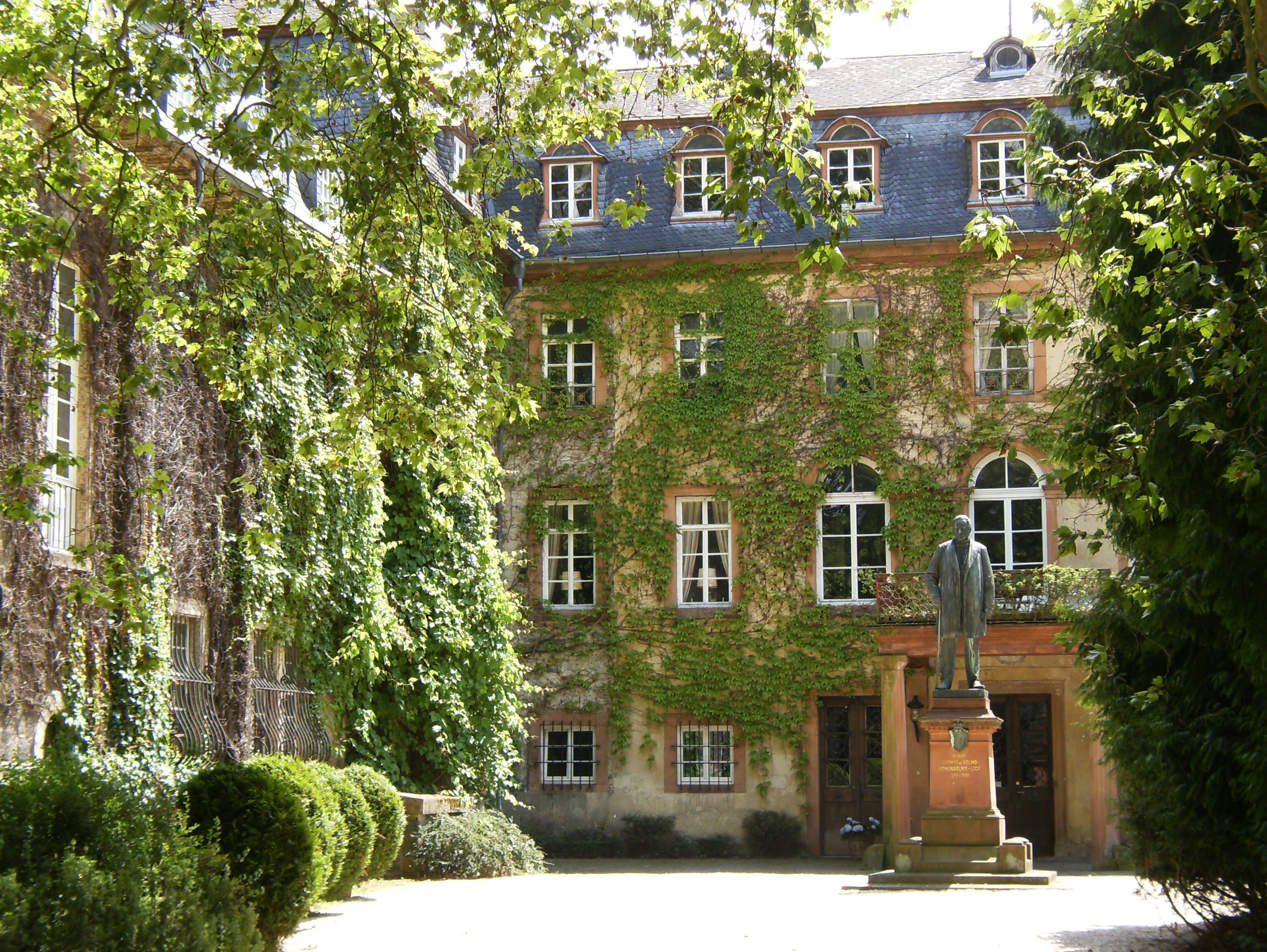
Inner court of Lich Castle and Ludwig Fürst zu Solms-Hohensolms-Lich monument

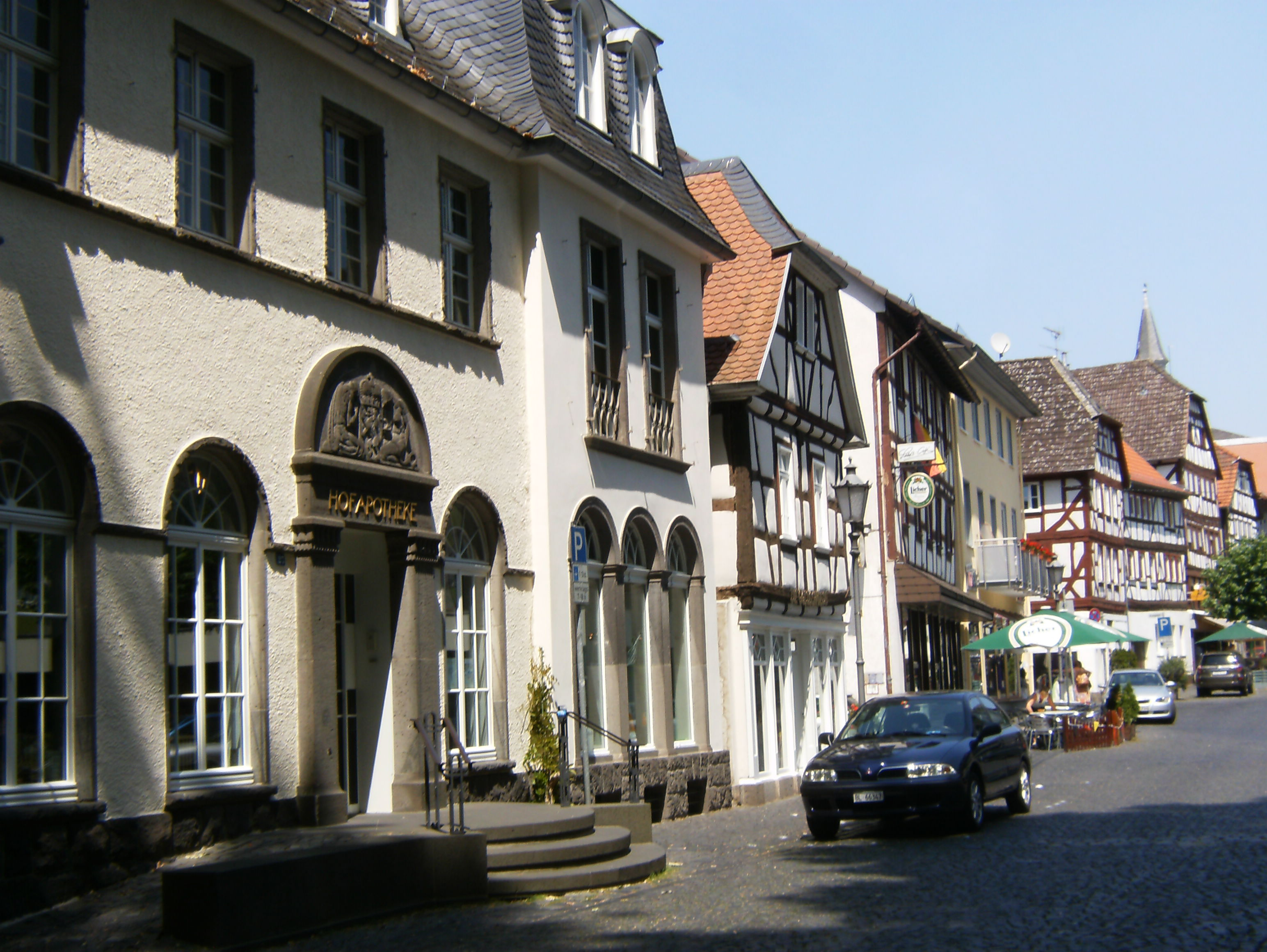
The Court pharmacy

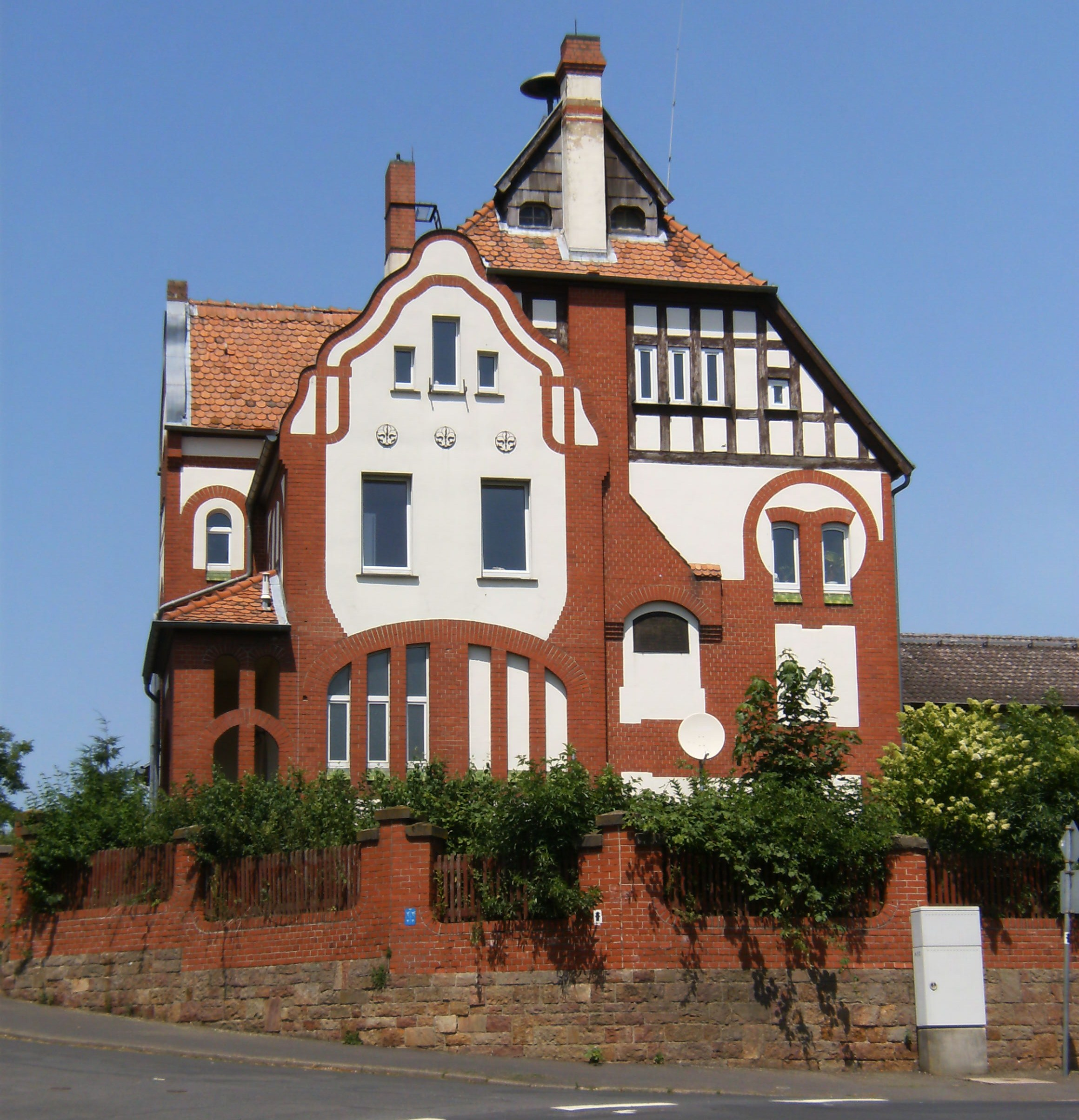
Birklar, former school building

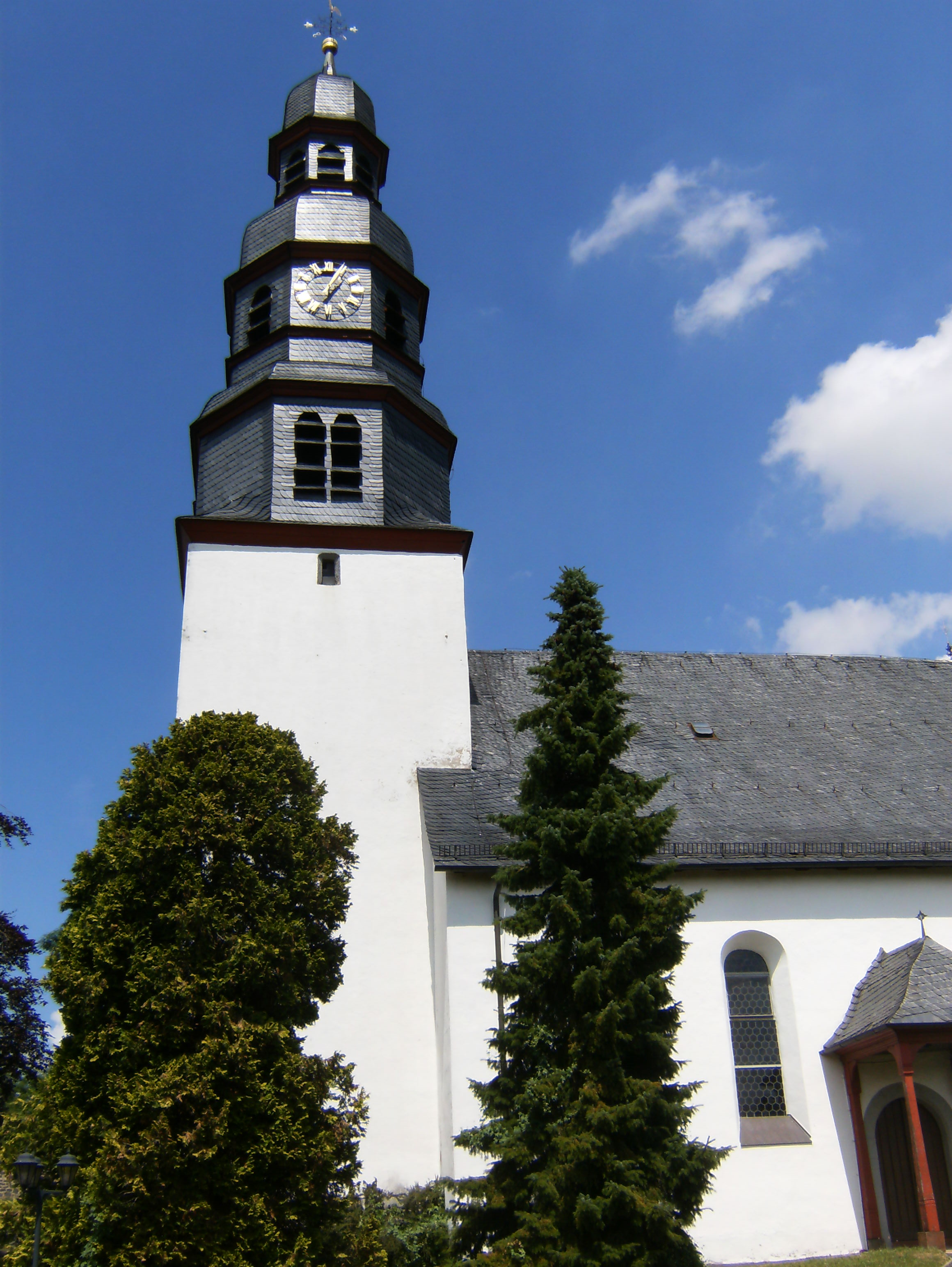
Eberstadt, Lutheran church

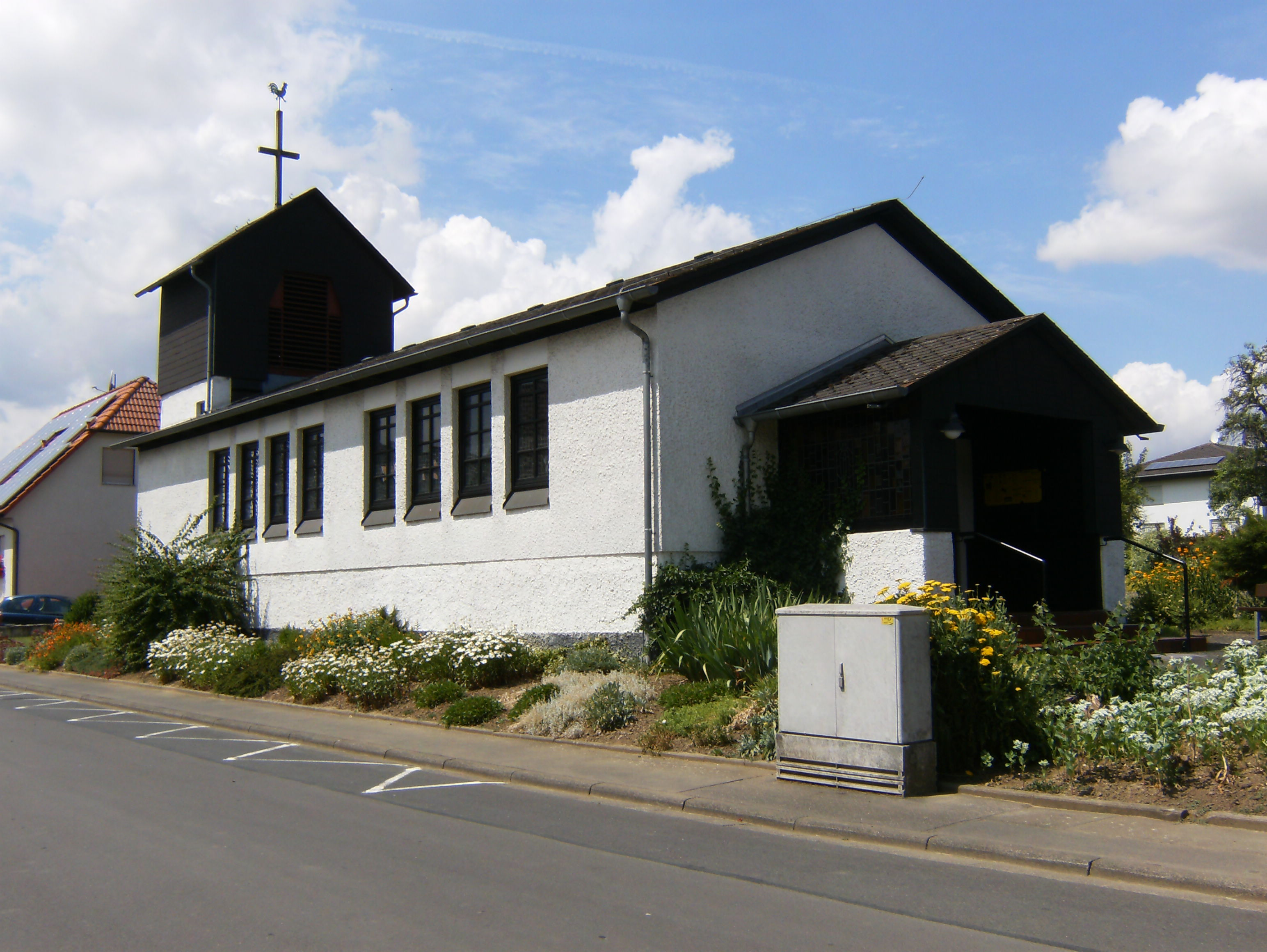
Eberstadt, Roman Catholic church St Maria Immaculata

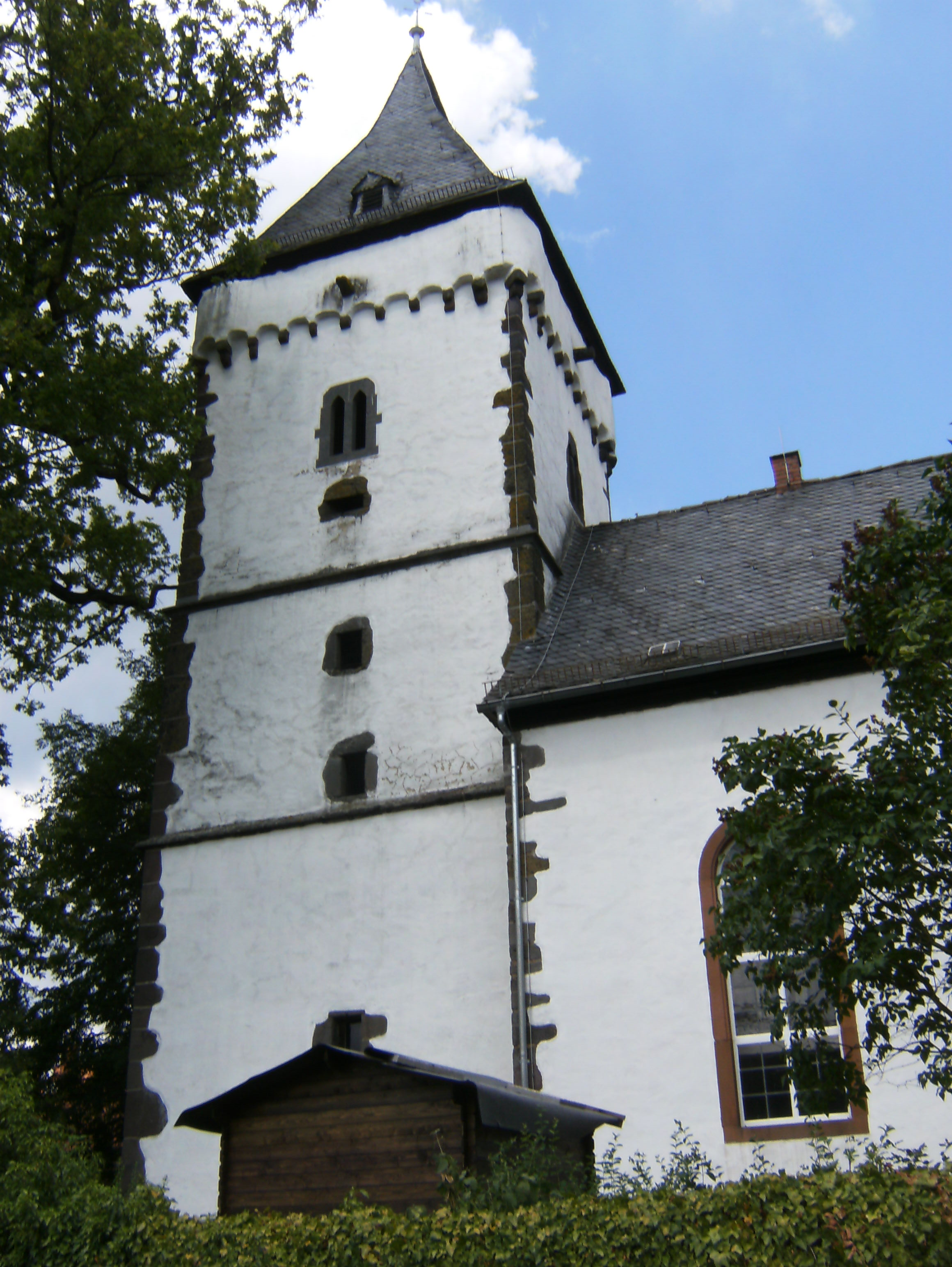
Nieder-Bessingen, Lutheran church

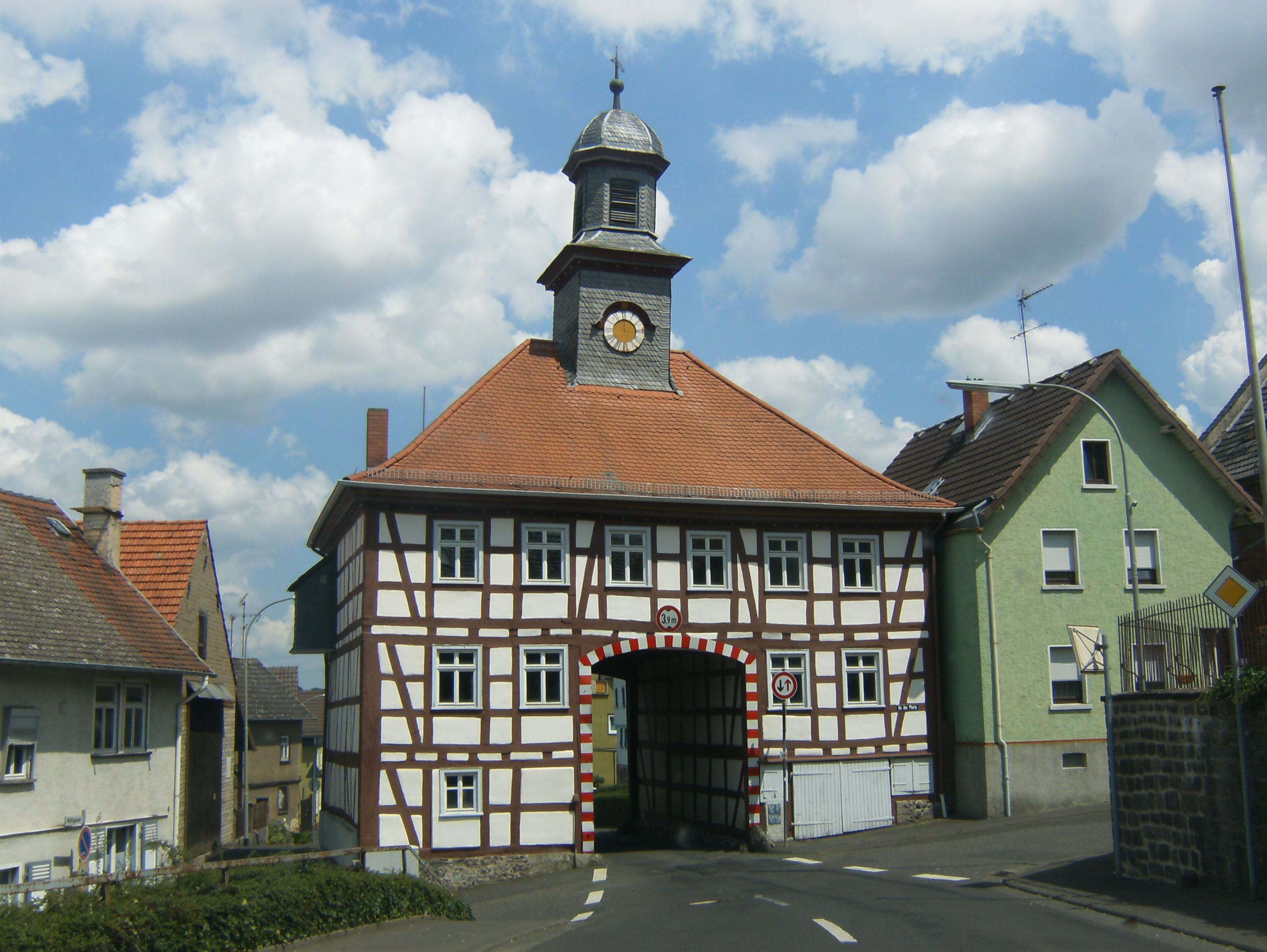
Ober-Bessingen, gate house

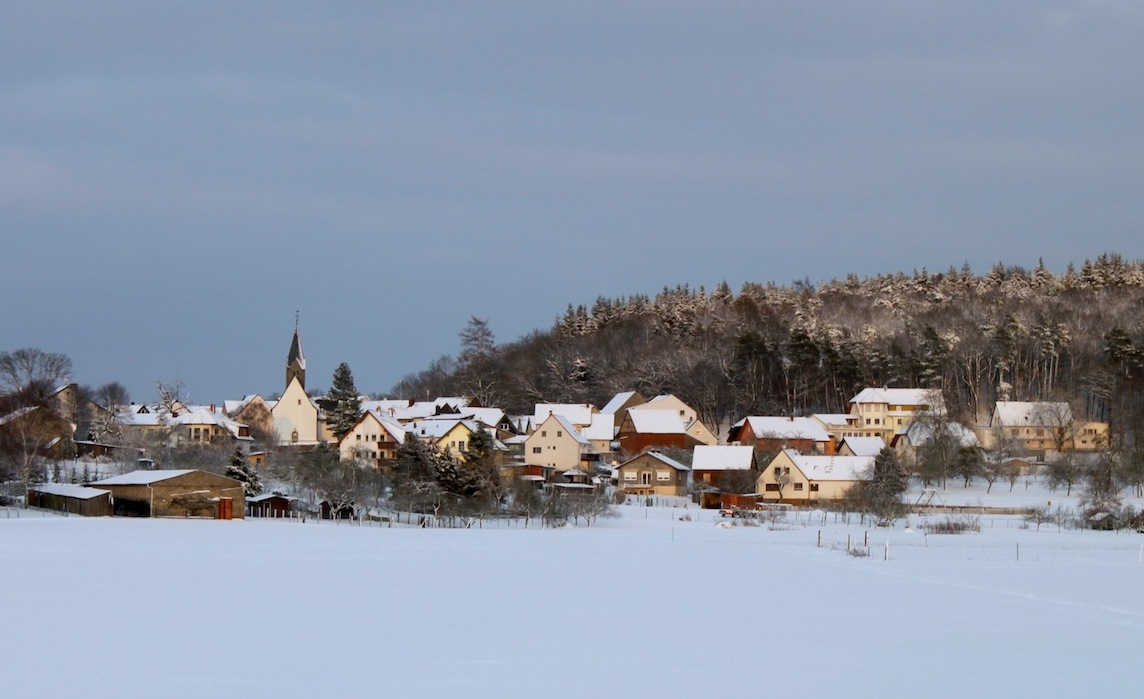
Ober-Bessingen in winter

== Notable people ==
=== Notable people born in Lich ===
- Ludwig zu Solms-Hohensolms-Lich (1805–1880), politician, President of the First Chamber of the Grand Duchy of Hesse and Deputy of the North German Confederation
- Heinrich Adam Neeb (1805–1878), composer
- Charles of Solms-Hohensolms-Lich (1866–1920), politician, president of the First Chamber of the Estates of the Grand Duchy of Hesse
- Princess Eleonore of Solms-Hohensolms-Lich (1871–1937), wife of Ernest Ludwig, Grand Duke of Hesse and mother-in-law to the Duke of Edinburgh's sister Princess Cecilie of Greece and Denmark
- Dorothea Gräfin Razumovsky (1935–2014), publicist
- Wilhelm Solms (b. 1937), Germanist, professor of communication studies
- Hermann Otto Solms (b. 1940), politician (FDP), up to 22 October 2013 Vice President of the Deutscher Bundestag.
- Alexandra Keil (b. 1978), former member of the German Women's National Basketball Team
- Stefan Koch (b. 1964), Germany's 2000 and 2005 Basketball Bundesliga Coach of the Year
- Benjamin Lense (b. 1978), footballer in the German Bundesliga
- Marc-Oliver Kempf (b. 1995), footballer in the German Bundesliga and the Italian Serie A
- Aylin Aslım (b. 1975), rock singer and actor
- Anna Lührmann (b. 1983), politician
- Ben Dörr (b. 2005), racing driver

=== Notable people connected to Lich ===
- Daniel Hisgen (1733–1812), painter of the Rococo period
- Hermann of Solms-Hohensolms-Lich (1838–1899), politician
- Ernst Moritz Engert (1892–1986), silhouette artist and co-founder of the Darmstädter Sezession
- Anne-Eva Brauneck (1910–2007), first female German criminal law professor
- Joachim Dudeck (1932–2010), professor of health informatics and founder of the German Cancer Registry
- Karl Starzacher (b. 1945), politician of the SPD, 1991–1995 President of the Landtag of Hesse and Finance Minister from 1995 to 1999
- Thorsten Schäfer-Gümbel (b. 1969), politician (SPD), current leader of the opposition SPD party bloc in the Landtag of Hesse
- Markus Wach, musician.
