= Isenburg-Büdingen =

Coat of arms of the Princes of Ysenburg-Büdingen, 1840

Isenburg-Büdingen was a County of southern Hesse, Germany, located in Büdingen. It was originally a part of the County of Isenburg.

== History ==
There were two different Counties of the same name. The first (1341–1511) was a partition of Isenburg-Cleberg, and was partitioned into Isenburg-Büdingen-Birstein and Isenburg-Ronneburg in 1511.

The second (1628–1806) was a partition of Isenburg-Büdingen-Birstein. It was partitioned between itself, Isenburg-Meerholz and Isenburg-Wächtersbach in 1673, and was mediatised to the Principality of Isenburg (formerly of Isenburg-Birstein) in 1806. In 1816 Isenburg was partitioned between the Grand Duchy of Hesse (or Hesse-Darmstadt) and the Electorate of Hesse (or Hesse-Cassel).

Count Ernest Casimir (1801-1848) was elevated to the rank of prince by Louis II, Grand Duke of Hesse, in 1840. Since then, the name of the branch is spelled Ysenburg and Büdingen, to distinguish it from the princes of Isenburg from the Isenburg-Birstein branch.

== Properties ==
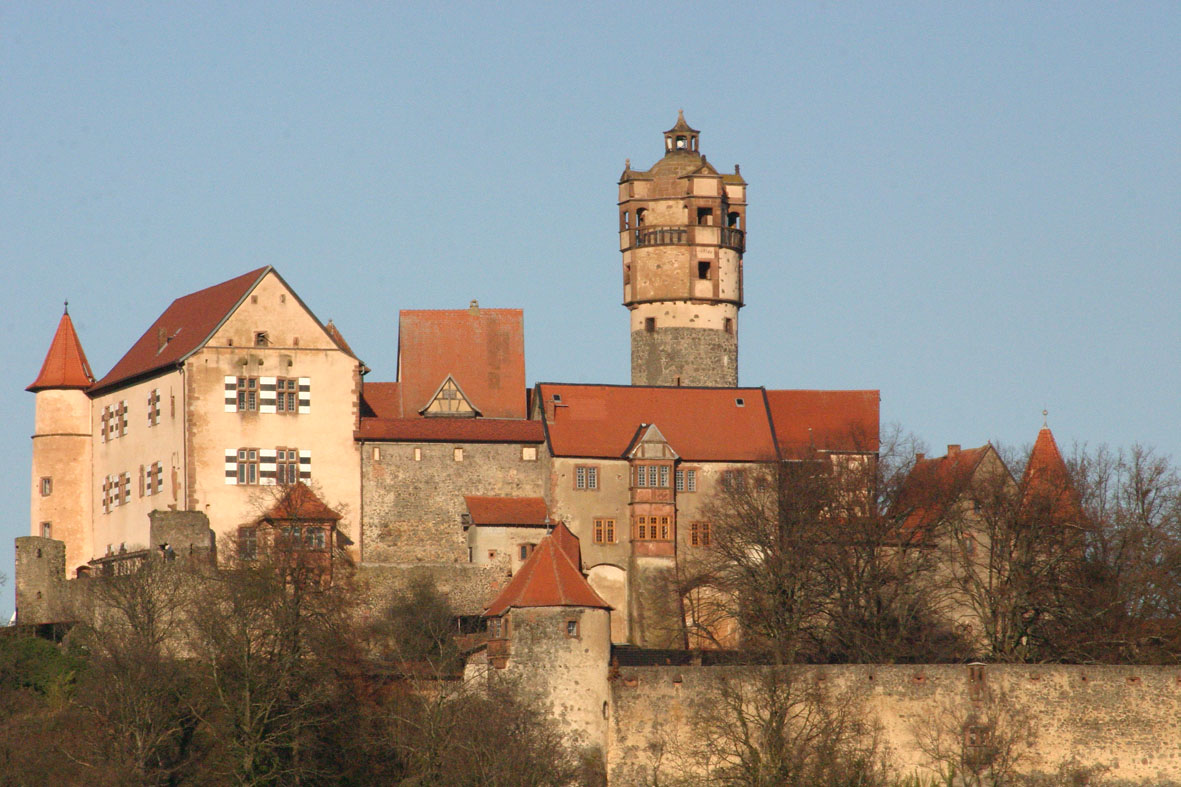
Castle Ronneburg, Hesse, owned by Ysenburg and Büdingen branch of an ancient German House of Ysenburg, Main-Kinzig district, Hesse, Germany (2008)

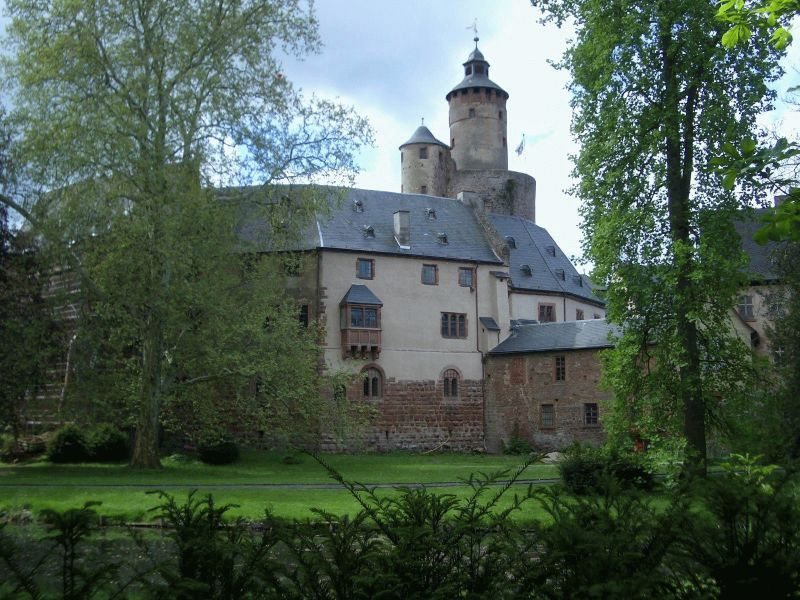
Büdingen Castle

== Counts of Isenburg-Büdingen ==
- Wolfgang Ernest I (1596–1633)
- Johann Ernst (1633-1673)
- Johann Casimir (1673–1693)
- Ernest Casimir, Count of Isenburg-Büdingen-Büdingen (1693–1749)
- Ernst Dietrich, Count of Isenburg-Büdingen (1749-1758)
- Ernest Casimir, Count of Isenburg-Büdingen (1758-1801) father of the 1st Prince

== Princes of Ysenburg-Büdingen-Büdingen ==
- Ernest Casimir III (1801-1848)
- Ernest Casimir IV (1848-1861)
- Bruno (1861-1906)
- Wolfgang (1906-1920)
- Alfred (1920-1922)
- Karl (1922-1941)
- Otto Friedrich (1904-1990), from the Ysenburg-Büdingen-Wächtersbach branch, adopted by Karl in 1936
- Wolfgang-Ernst (b. 1936)
- Wolfgang-Ernst, 8th Prince 1990- (b.1936) ∞ Leonille Princess of Sayn-Wittgenstein-Berleburg
  - Hereditary Prince Casimir-Alexander (b.1967)
    - Prince Tristan Alexander (b.2014)
  - Prince Maximilian (b.1969)
    - Prince Tassilo-Alexander (b.2006)

== See also ==
- Diether von Isenburg, son of Diether I
