= Wächtersbach station =

Railway station in Wächtersbach, Germany

Wächtersbach
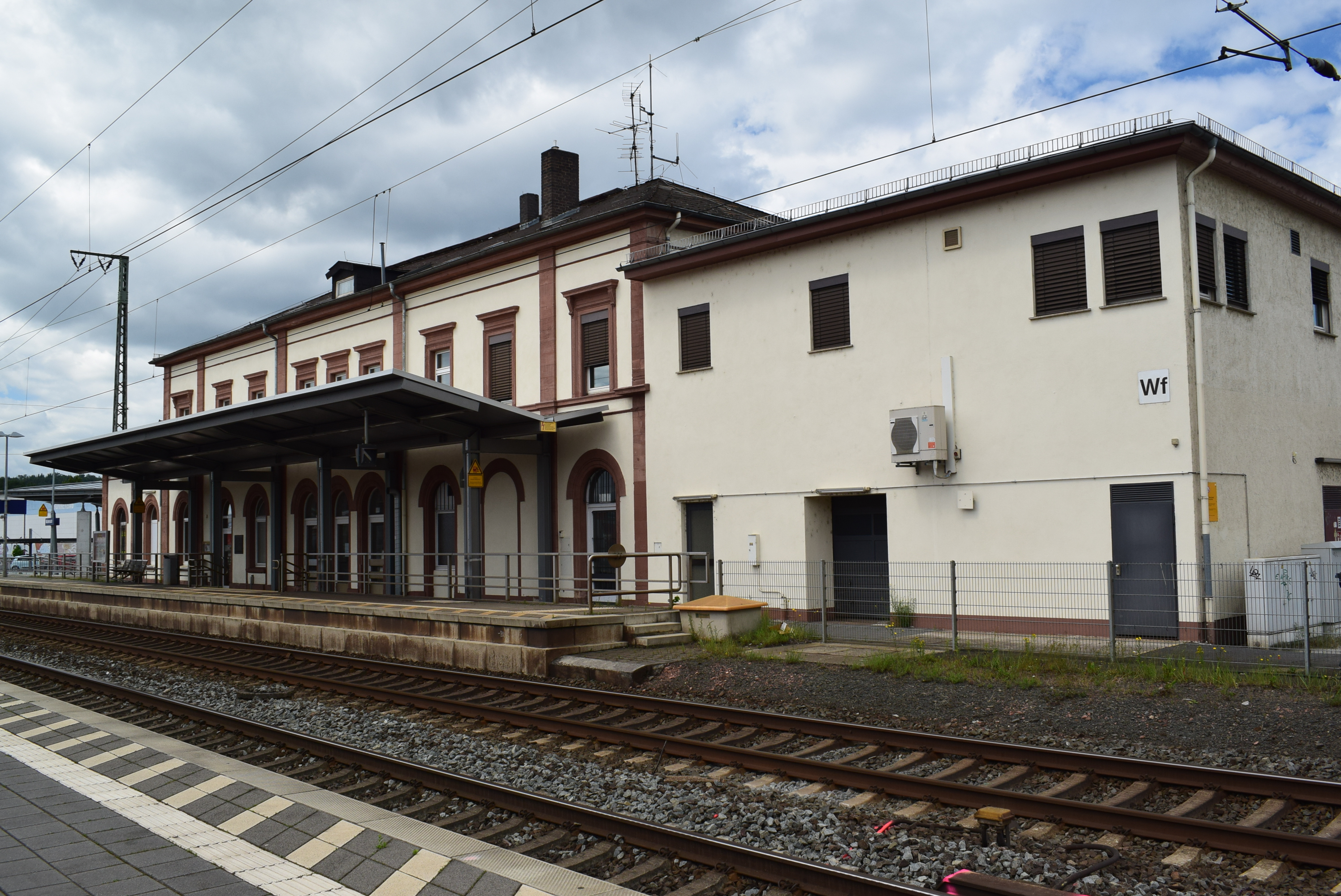
- 2019

General information
- Location: Am Bahnhof 2, Wächtersbach, Hesse; Germany
- Coordinates: 50°15′18″N 9°17′47″E
- Owner: Deutsche Bahn
- Operator: DB Netz; DB Station&Service
- Lines: Fulda–Frankfurt (54.8 km); Wächtersbach–Bad Orb; Wächtersbach–Hartmannshain (closed, today a cycle track called Vogelsberger Südbahnradweg)
- Platforms: 3 (and 1 special platform)

Construction
- Accessible: Yes

Other information
- Station code: 6460
- DS100 code: FWAE
- IBNR: 8006132
- Category: 4
- Fare zone: : 3222
- Website: www.bahnhof.de

History
- Opened: 1 May 1867

Services
Preceding station	DB Regio Mitte	Following station
Gelnhausen towards Frankfurt (Main) Hbf	RE 50	Bad Soden-Salmünster towards Bebra
Wirtheim towards Frankfurt (Main) Hbf	RB 51	Terminus
Location

Wächtersbach station is a station in the town of Wächtersbach in the German state of Hesse on the Frankfurt–Göttingen railway. The former Bad Orb Light Railway (Bad Orber Kleinbahn) branches off at the station. It was originally standard gauge, but has been converted to narrow gauge. The Vogelsberg Southern Railway (Vogelsberger Südbahn) also used to branch off here to Hartmannshain (in the municipality of Grebenhain) via Birstein. The station is classified by Deutsche Bahn (DB) as a category 4 station.

== History ==
The station was opened on 1 May 1867 along with the Hanau–Waechtersbach section of the Frankfurt–Bebra railway.

The Wächtersbach–Birstein section of the Vogelsberg Southern Railway was opened on 30 June 1898 by the Wächtersbach-Birstein Light Railway Company (Wächtersbach-Birsteiner Kleinbahn-Gesellschaft). The Birstein-Hartmannshain section was opened on 23 December 1934. The Vogelsberg Southern Railway was closed on 27 May 1967. Today the Vogelsberg Southern Railway cycle track (Vogelsberger Südbahnradweg) is built on it.

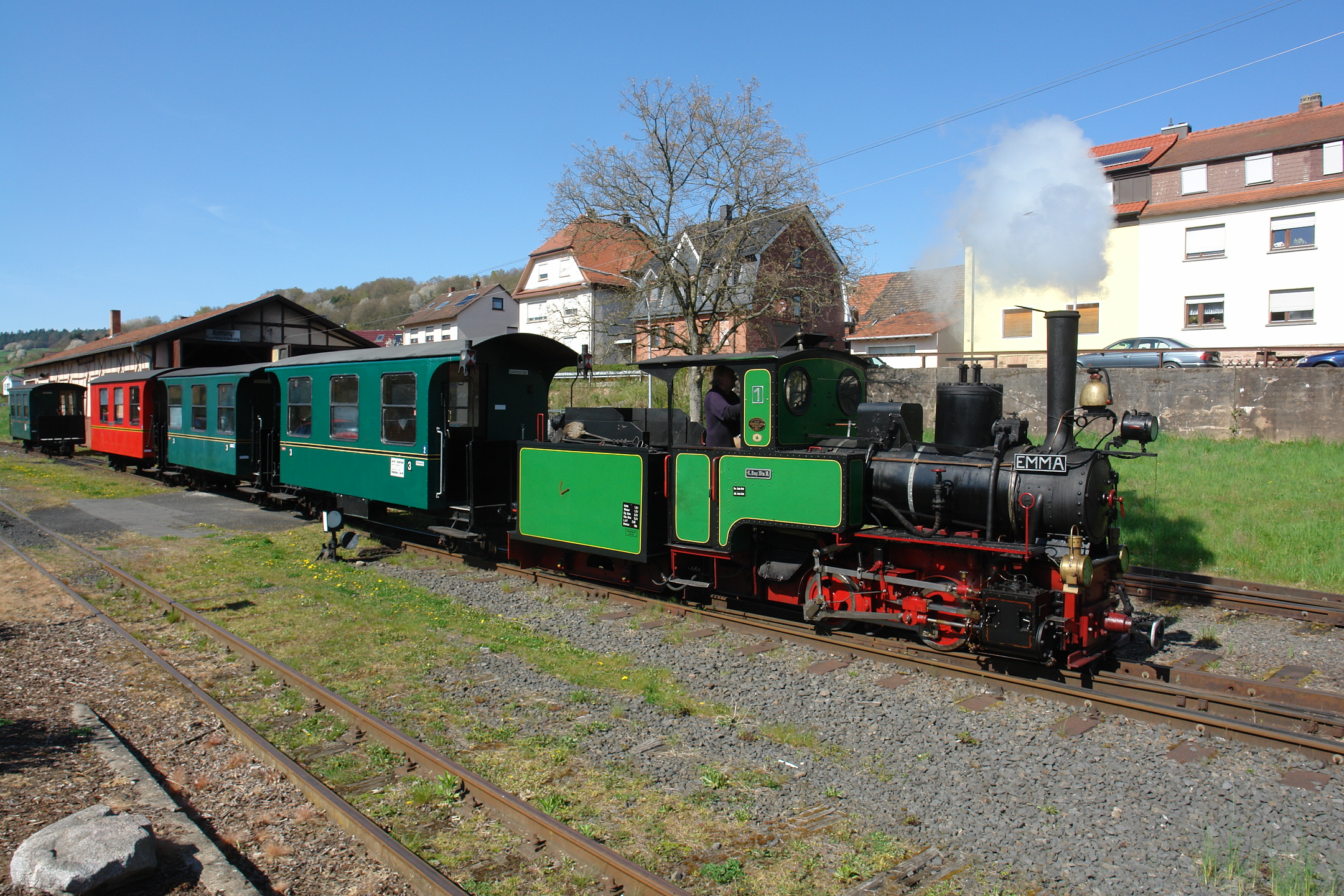
Dampfkleinbahn Wächtersbach-Bad Orb (locomotive Emma)

The Wächtersbach–Bad Orb railway was originally a standard gauge line, which began in Wächtersbach and ran to Bad Orb. It was opened on 23 May 1901 and closed on 4 March 1995. On 26 May 2001, the first section in Bad Orb was reopened as a 600-mm gauge railway and the whole route to Wächtersbach has been operated since 29 October 2006 (locomotive Emma). The seasonal service operates on Sundays and public holidays from Easter to the end of October. Trains stop at the former station called Wächtersbach Kleinbahnhof next to Wächtersbach station and the operator uses the (unofficial) platform 21.

== Infrastructure ==
The entrance building of Wächtersbach station is now listed as a monument under the Hessian Heritage Act.

The station has a “home” platform (next to the station building) and an island platform. The home platform (platform 1) is served by Regional-Express services from Fulda to Frankfurt. Track 2 and track 3, which are on the central island platform, are used by services in the opposite direction. Regionalbahn services to Frankfurt start on track 3.

The station was rebuilt to make it accessible for the disabled in 2015.

== Operations ==
Fares in Wächtersbach are set and services are managed by the Rhein-Main-Verkehrsverbund (Rhine-Main Transport Association, RMV). The station is served by Regional-Express and Regionalbahn services. In the summer months from May to October tourist trains (Emma) run three times a day.

=== Rail ===
Regional-Express trains from Fulda to Frankfurt (RE 50) stop at the station hourly every day. There is also a daily hourly service of Regionalbahn (stopping) trains (RB 51). During the weekday peak hours some Regionalbahn services start from or terminate at Bad Soden-Salmunster.

=== Buses ===
Wächtersbach bus station is served by bus routes 81 to 84, which connect to Bad Soden-Salmunster, Flörsbachtal, Jossgrund and Bad Orb. Bus lines 71 and 72 are connections between Wächtersbach-Brachttal-Birstein.
