= Wächtersbach =

- Town
- Coat of arms

- Location of Wächtersbach within Main-Kinzig-Kreis district
- Interactive map of Wächtersbach
- Location within Germany Location within Hesse
- Coordinates: 50°15′17″N 9°17′31″E
- Country: Germany
- State: Hesse
- Admin. region: Darmstadt
- District: Main-Kinzig-Kreis
- Subdivisions: 8 Ortsteile

Government
  - Mayor (2019–25): Andreas Weiher (SPD)

Area
  - Total: 50.79 km^{2} (19.61 sq mi)
- Elevation: 144–400 m (472–1,312 ft)

Population (2025-12-31)
  - Total: 12,684
  - Density: 249.7/km^{2} (646.8/sq mi)
- Time zone: UTC+01:00 (CET)
  - Summer (DST): UTC+02:00 (CEST)
- Postal codes: 63607
- Dialling codes: 06053
- Vehicle registration: MKK
- Website: www.stadt-waechtersbach.de

The town of Wächtersbach (German pronunciation: [ˈvɛçtɐsbax]) is part of the Main-Kinzig-Kreis in Hesse, Germany. In 1982, the town hosted the 22nd Hessentag state festival.

== Location ==
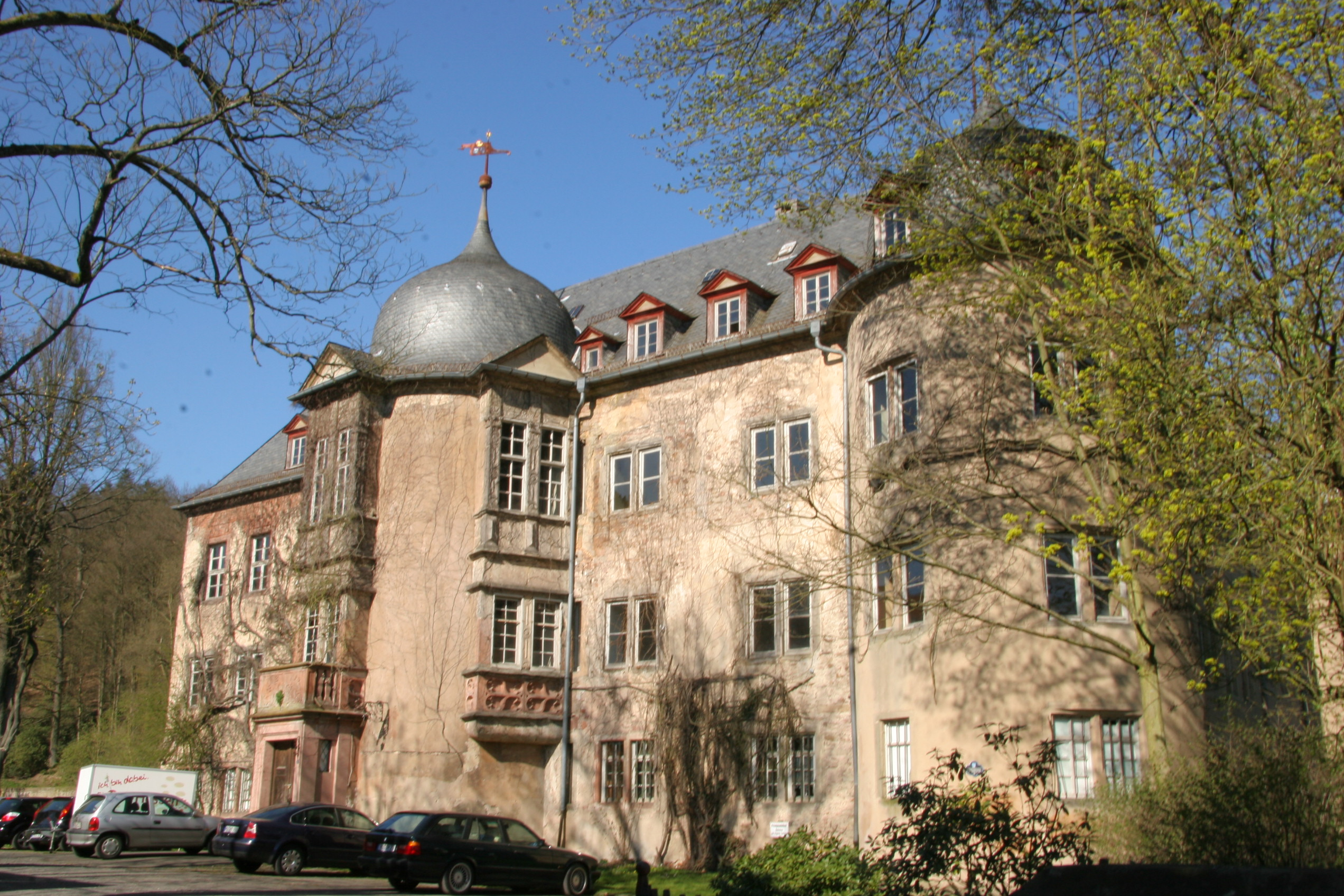
Castle of the House of Isenburg-Wächtersbach

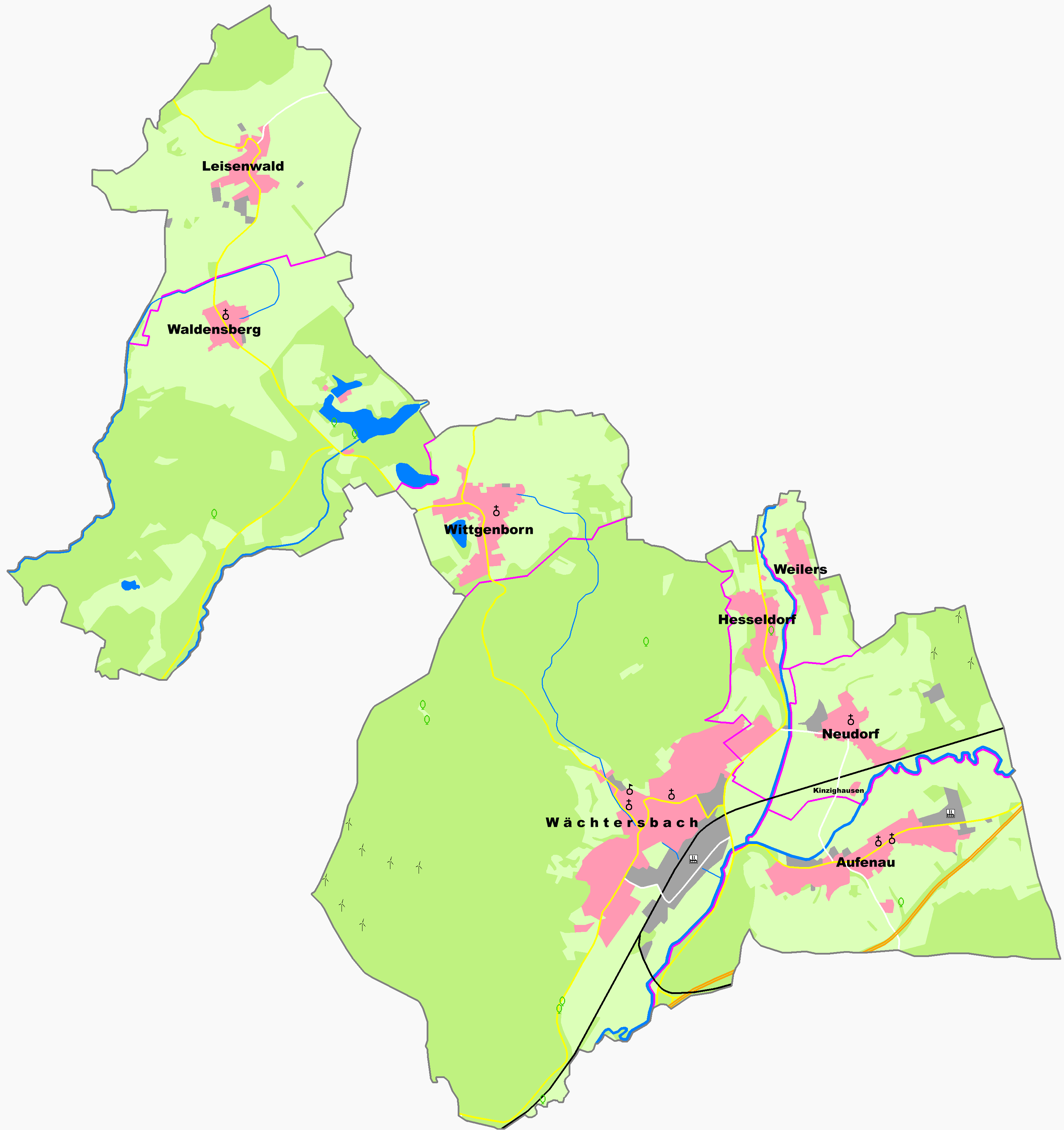
Constituent communities

Wächtersbach lies between the Spessart and the Vogelsberg Mountains in the middle Kinzig valley at the edge of the Büdingen Forest, not far from the towns of Gelnhausen, Birstein, Bad Orb and Bad Soden-Salmünster.

== Neighbouring communities ==
To the north, Wächtersbach borders on the communities of Kefenrod (Wetteraukreis) and Brachttal. To the east it abuts the town of Bad Soden-Salmünster, and in the south the town of Bad Orb and the community of Biebergemünd. In the west it borders the community of Gründau.

== Economy ==
Wächtersbach is well known for its retail fair, the Wächtersbacher Messe, held yearly for end customers in the week around Ascension Day. Retail business and the electrical engineering industry underpin the town's economic life. Over the last few years, many shops have located in Wächtersbach bringing many people in from outlying towns and communities to do their shopping.

The town was famous for the brightly colored porcelain coffee cups and other dinnerware that are made there at the Wächtersbach Ceramic Factory, founded in 1832 (Although the manufacture of some of the coffee cups and dinnerware are now outsourced to Spain). The Wächtersbach Ceramic Factory coffee cups are noted for being superbly designed—they have unusually thick circular porcelain walls that allow them to keep the coffee (or tea or hot chocolate) hot longer than regular coffee cups. They also have larger than normal handles, making them easy to grasp. The Factory closed in 2011.

== Sports and leisure ==
- Heated open-air swimming pool
- 48 km marked hiking trails
- Bowling
- Bicycle rental
- Tennis courts
- Horseback riding
- Angling
- Südbahn bicycle path

== Infrastructure ==
The Kinzig Valley Railway with the Wächtersbach station leads through the town.
