= Könitz Porzellan =

German ceramics company

Könitz Porzellan GmbH
- Company type: GmbH
- Industry: Porcelain
- Founded: 1909
- Headquarters: Könitz, Thuringia
- Key people: Turpin Rosenthal, executive director
- Revenue: 16 million Euro (2009)
- Number of employees: Worldwide c. 500
- Website: koenitz.com

Porcelain produced by VEB Konitz-Kahla c. 1965

The Könitz Porzellan GmbH is a company in Könitz, a district of the commune Unterwellenborn. The company includes the Wiedemannsche Druckerei, the brand WAECHTERSBACH as well as the Weimarer Porzellanmanufaktur.

== Timeline ==
Year	Major event
1909	Könitz's first round stoves launched
1912	Production expanded
1948	Merger occurs into the Soviet A. G. Ceramic Factory Hermsdorf
1951	Company becomes public property
1962	Könitz is integrated with Kahla to be VEB Konitz-Kahla
1993	Könitz is purchased from the state trust by Turpin Rosenthal
2000	Mugs are featured in the Wiedemannsche Druckerei
2001	Formation of the Thai subsidiary Konitz Asia
2006	Waechtersbach Ceramics and "Weimarer Porzellanmanufaktur are acquired
2009	100th anniversary occurs
2025	Firm declares banruptcy.

== History ==
=== Founding ===
The Könitz Porzellan factory was founded in 1909 in Könitz, Germany. The original founders were brothers Richard and Max Metzel and their partner Rödel. Some of the first products produced included porcelain cups, mugs, and bowls, most of which were exported to England. In 1912, due to increasing demand, the company expanded and took on the new name Könitz Porcelain Factory Gebrüder Metzel. At the end of World War II, Könitz was considered one of the leading medium-sized porcelain manufacturers in Germany.

In 1948 the company was taken over by a trustee; in 1950the company was merged into the Soviet A. G. Ceramic Factory Hermsdorf and produced only industrial porcelain and insulators, for which the factory was famous (see brand names HESCHO and TRI-DELTA). In 1951 the company was nationalized, becoming public property.

=== As VEB Konitz-Kahla ===
With the centralization of the East German economy in 1962, Könitz became state property. It was integrated into a private company, VEB Konitz-Kahla.

When the Iron Curtain fell in 1989 Könitz had a chance to re-establish itself. Under new direction and under the original Könitz brand name, the production of household porcelain goods resumed. The company rejoined the international market, shipping goods to the Netherlands, Israel, Italy, Norway, Austria, and the United States.

At the beginning of the 1970s the name "KÖNITZ" disappeared for nearly 20 years from the backstamp while other porcelain producers, e.g. Volkstedt, Uhlstädt, Garsitz near Königsee and Langenberg in Gera incorporated to Kombinat Kahla. Between 1984 and December 1985 investments contributed to most of Könitz's modern assembly line of mugs originating from Europe Beside Kahla porcelain, Könitz porcelain was one of few manufacturers which continued to exist after the turn. The available mug assortment was extended by new forms and designs.

=== Könitz as an independent business ===
On December 21, 1993, Turpin Rosenthal, a sixth generation member of the porcelain industry, son of Philip Rosenthal and grandson of the founder of Rosenthal AG, purchased Könitz from the state trust. It was not until 1995 that he gained full ownership of the company, during which time the company suffered heavy losses and was near bankruptcy. The company thus reorganized and restructured in 1996.

Rosenthal narrowed the focus of the Könitz brand to cup and mug products and sought to establish the company as the leading expert in coffee and tea cups. Along with extensive investment and rebuilding measures, i.e. the purchase of the new decorational fire stove in 2008, Könitz developed its position in the international market much more steadfast. In 2001, Könitz founded the Thai subsidiary Konitz Asia Ltd.

In 2006 and 2007, respectively, the Könitz Group acquired two other German companies, Waechtersbach Ceramics (est. 1832) and Weimar Porzellan (est. 1790). Waechtersbach USA is the primary distributor of Könitz products in the United States & Canada. The subsidiary was founded in 1976, purchased by Konitz Porzellan in 2009.

Könitz celebrated its 100th anniversary in 2009. To this day, Könitz is Europe's largest supplier of mugs and related products. In the course of that, the factory shops were restructured and renovated and at the beginning of September, 2009 were re-opened.

In late 2025, the firm was forced to declare bankruptcy.
