= Freiensteinau =

- Municipality
- Coat of arms

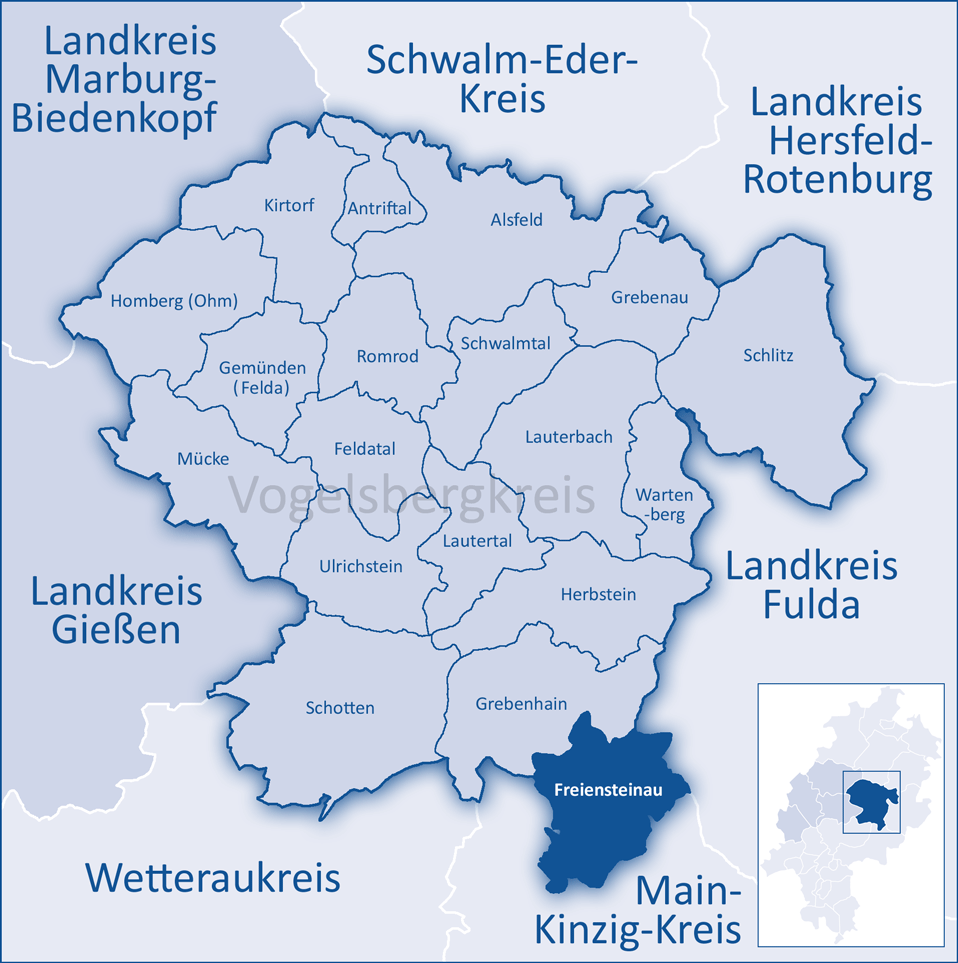
- Location of Freiensteinau within Vogelsbergkreis district
- Interactive map of Freiensteinau
- Location within Germany Location within Hesse
- Coordinates: 50°26′N 09°24′E
- Country: Germany
- State: Hesse
- Admin. region: Gießen
- District: Vogelsbergkreis

Government
  - Mayor (2020–26): Sascha Spielberger

Area
  - Total: 65.66 km^{2} (25.35 sq mi)
- Elevation: 444 m (1,457 ft)

Population (2025-12-31)
  - Total: 2,974
  - Density: 45.29/km^{2} (117.3/sq mi)
- Time zone: UTC+01:00 (CET)
  - Summer (DST): UTC+02:00 (CEST)
- Postal codes: 36399
- Dialling codes: 06666
- Vehicle registration: VB
- Website: www.freiensteinau.de

Freiensteinau (German: [ˌfʁaɪənˈʃtaɪnaʊ]) is a municipality in the Vogelsbergkreis in Hesse, Germany.

== Geography ==
=== Location ===
Freiensteinau lies on the southern slopes of the Vogelsberg Mountains.

=== Neighbouring municipalities ===
Freiensteinau borders in the north on the municipality of Grebenhain, in the northeast on the municipality of Hosenfeld (Fulda district), in the east on the municipality of Neuhof (Fulda district), in the south on the town of Steinau an der Straße (Main-Kinzig-Kreis) and in the west on the municipality of Birstein (Main-Kinzig-Kreis).

=== Constituent municipalities ===
The municipality consists of the twelve centres of Freiensteinau (administrative seat), Holzmühl, Fleschenbach, Salz, Ober-Moos, Nieder-Moos, Gunzenau, Reichlos, Weidenau, Reinhards, Hessisch Radmühl and Preußisch Radmühl.

== Politics ==
=== Municipal council ===
The municipal elections on 26 March 2006 yielded the following results:

Parties and voter coalitions		Share in %	Seats
CDU	Christian Democratic Union	25.1	5
SPD	Social Democratic Party of Germany	33.9	6
FW	Freie Wähler	41.0	8
total		100	19

Elections in March 2016

- CDU = 2 seats
- SPD = 3 seats
- FW = 8 seats
- UBL = 4 seats
- Bündnis = 2 seats

=== Mayors ===
In July 2014 Sascha Spielberger was elected the new mayor, he started in office in December 2014, and was re-elected in 2020.

Former mayors:

- 1971–1991: Johannes Karl
- 1991–2014: Friedel Kopp

=== Partnerships ===
- Tourouvre, Normandy, France since 1977

== Culture and sightseeing ==
=== Music ===
The organ at the Evangelical Church in Nieder-Moos was built in 1790-1791 by Johann-Markus Oestreich from Oberbimbach near Fulda. Every year, the Nieder-Mooser Sommerkonzerte (Nieder-Moos Summer Concerts) take place around the organ.

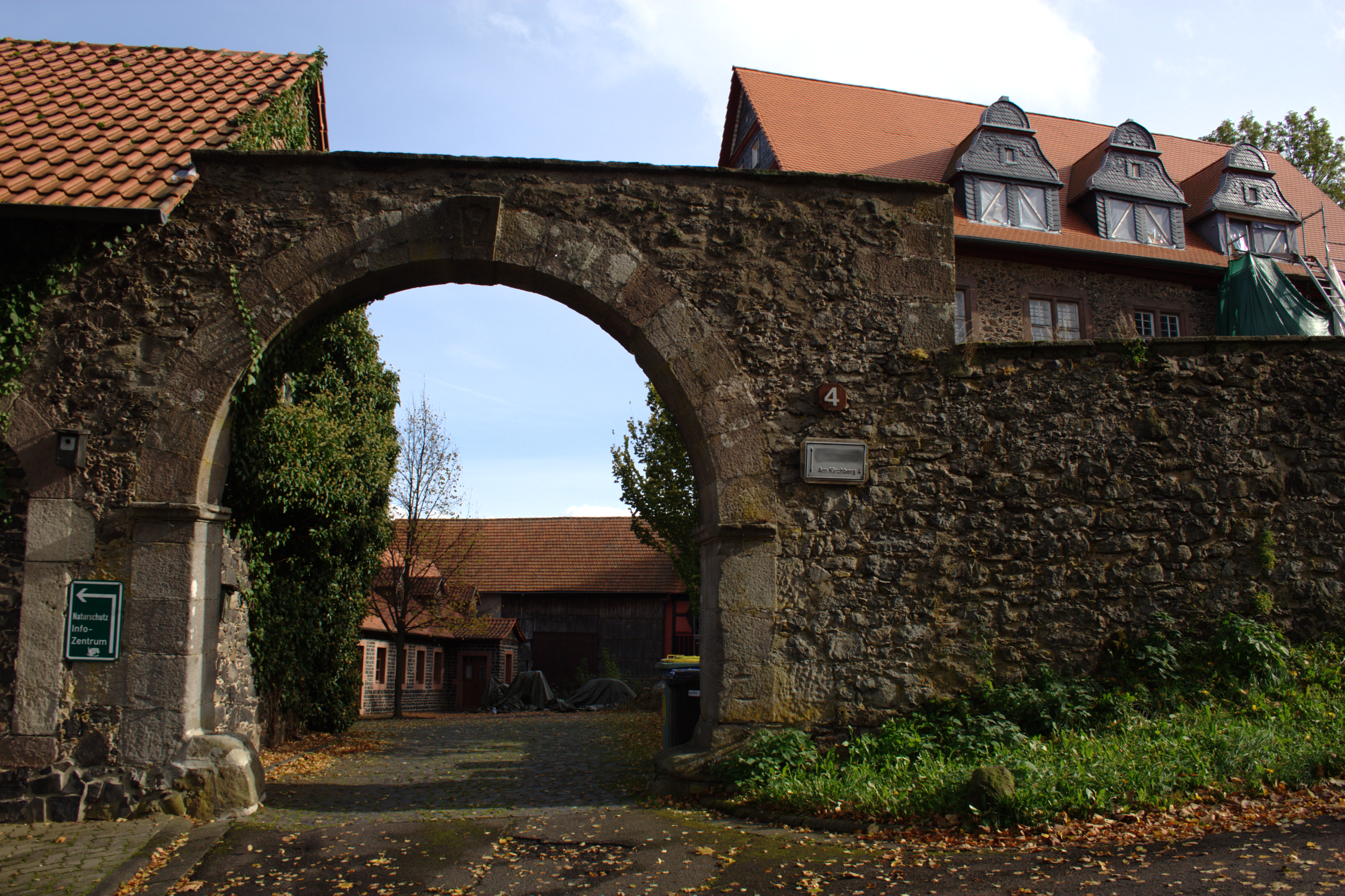
Freiensteinau Castle: gate

== Sundry ==
A curious fact about the municipality's political history is that before Hesse's municipal reforms in the 1970s, the 12 constituent municipalities nowadays within Freiensteinau not only were not united, but even belonged to four different districts: Fulda, Gelnhausen, Lauterbach and Schlüchtern.
