= HTS tentiQ =

German temporary structure company

HTS TENTIQ
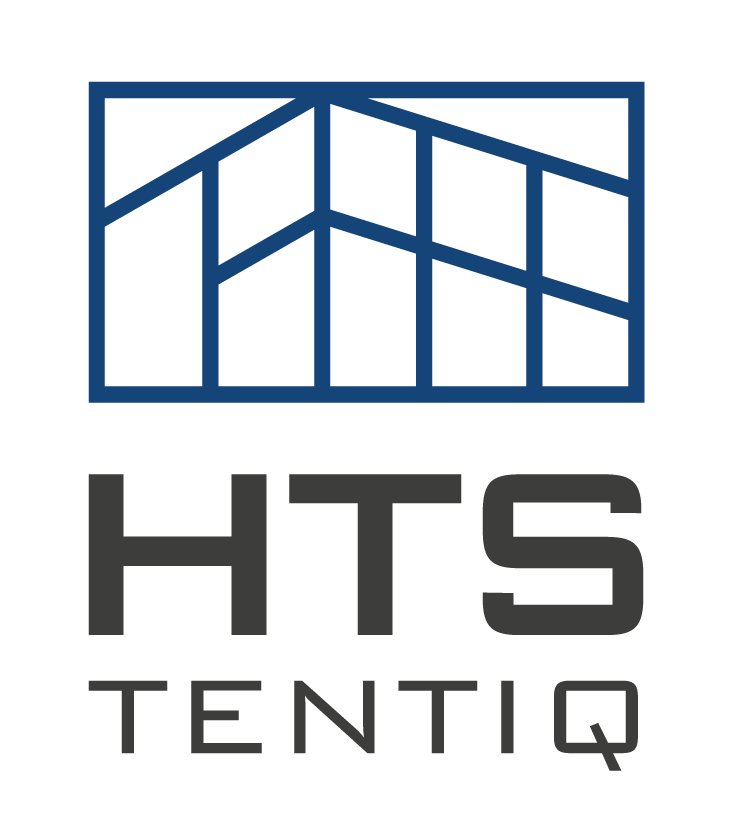
- Formerly: Röder HTS Höcker
- Company type: Limited company
- Industry: design and manufacture temporary structures
- Founded: 2001
- Headquarters: Kefenrod, Germany
- Key people: Christoph Röttges (CEO) Markus Schiefer (CFO) Giles Hill
- Revenue: 82 million euros (2019)
- Number of employees: 294 (2023)
- Subsidiaries: HTS Industriebau
- Website: hts-tentiq.com

HTS TENTIQ is a German company that develops and builds temporary buildings and marquees. Its head office and production facility are located in Kefenrod, Germany.

== History ==
HTS TENTIQ was established in 2001 in Kefenrod, Germany.

Between 2002 and 2003 the strategic sales offices opened in the Great Britain, France and the Middle East and grew further in 2006 with further offices being opened in Singapore and Russia in 2006 and in India in 2007.

In 2013 the company acquired the shares in the Huaye Tent (Kunshan) Co. Ltd in China.

In 2014 the affiliated company HTS Industriebau was established, specializing in steel framed structures.

== Activity ==
In 2009, the company designed the 3-story temporary Pit Lane Pavilion building for the CLIPSAL 500 event held in South Australia. The structure had the following features: the ground level consisted of 36 Pit Lane garages, the ground floor accommodated various operational and medical offices, and the first and second floors incorporated numerous different sized hospitality suits, TV and radio broadcasting suites, race control, media centre and others.

Later in 2009 the company launched HTS Industrial, a specialist division providing the hire and sale of industrial temporary buildings and warehouses direct to end user customers. The division now has sales and distribution warehouses in Europe, Australia and the United States.

In 2010 a new carbon/alloy hybrid frame structure system ‘Carbon-Hybrid’ was officially launched and patented, significantly reducing the volume and weight of structures with the help of carbon inserts. In the same year HTS Avantgarde external glass and solid walling system was patented.

In 2012 an order with the Russian Federation Defence Ministry established a new Military division specialising in the design, manufacture and supply of turnkey field camps and individual military tents and shelters.

In 2013 the company won a tender costing 27.6 million US dollars for the construction of a new international airport terminal building in Nairobi (Kenya), after a fire destroyed the original building. The new terminal enabled the airport to increase the airport's capacity to 7.5 million people per year.

In 2015 the company carried out a project on the construction of several refugee camps in Germany, and in 2016 during the Tent Expo’16 exhibition a contract was made with Italy for the refugee field camp solutions.

In July 2016, the company acquired a project for a structure that would be used at Chornomorets Stadium in Odessa for the 2017 Eurovision Song Contest. However, on 9 September it was announced that the Eurovision Song Contest would be held in Kyiv in the International Exhibition Centre.

The company also designed, manufactured and installed the exhibition buildings for Sokolniki Park. In 2008 a semi-permanent two-storey structure was built with a total area of 3,650 m^{2}.

The company regularly supplies hospitality structures to accommodate spectators during race events for Audi, Porsche, BMW, Hankook and other car manufacturers.

As reported by HTS TENTIQ, the company's turnover in 2012 amounted to 120 million euros.

The company has won IFAI and IFEA awards.
