= Marburger =

Marburger is a German surname. Notable people with the surname include:

- Ivana Marburger Themmen (born 1935), American composer
- John Marburger (1941–2011), American physicist
- Manuel Marburger (born 1973), German industrial climber
- Sebastian Marburger (born 1997), German para cross-country skier

== See also ==
- Marburg, town in Hesse, Germany
