= Robbe (disambiguation) =

Robbe is an international company specialising in kits for model aircraft, boats and cars.

Robbe may also refer to:

- Robbe (surname), a surname
- Robbe De Hert (born 1942), Belgian film director
- Robert "Robbe" Helenius (born 1984), Finnish boxer

== See also ==
- Robbe-Grillet
