= Fritz Dupre =

German metal ores trader

Fritz Dupré
- Born: Friedrich Carl Cornel Philipp Dupré; 10 March 1862; Soden-Salmünster, Hesse, Germany
- Died: 9 December 1936 (aged 74); Hampstead, London, England
- Resting place: Highgate Cemetery
- Occupations: Iron and manganese ore trader

Fritz Dupré was a London merchant of iron and manganese ores, who became known as the "Manganese Ore King".

== Early life and career ==
Friedrich Carl Cornel Philipp Dupré was born in Bad Soden-Salmünster, in the Main-Kinzig district, in Hesse, Germany, on 10 March 1862. His parents were Wilhelm (Guillaume) Charles Frédéric Achilles and Ernestine Weisbecker. Little is known about his education and early life, but at the age of 31 he came to London. For his first two years there, he worked with the iron ore trader Herman at H. Borner & Co in Leadenhall Street.

In March 1895, he established F. Dupré & Co, dealing principally in iron and manganiferous ores from Greece and Spain for supply to the steel making industry. Refinements in steel required manganese ore with a lower phosphorus content, and Dupré contracted to take almost the whole production of the largest Brazilian manganese ore mine, the Morro da Mina Mine, to sell in Europe and the US. From 1900, India developed into a major source of low phosphorus manganese ore and Dupré introduced it into Europe and the US as "Oriental Manganese Ore". He had also continued as a trader in manganese ores from the Caucasus.

Following the Russian nationalisation of these mines in 1918, through a financial support deal with Russia's exclusive broker, Harriman, he strengthened his position in the manganese ore trade to such an extent that he became known as the "Manganese Ore King". In the 1920s, he further cemented his dominance in the trade by securing the European sole selling rights for new mines in the British Gold Coast Colony.

== Personal life ==
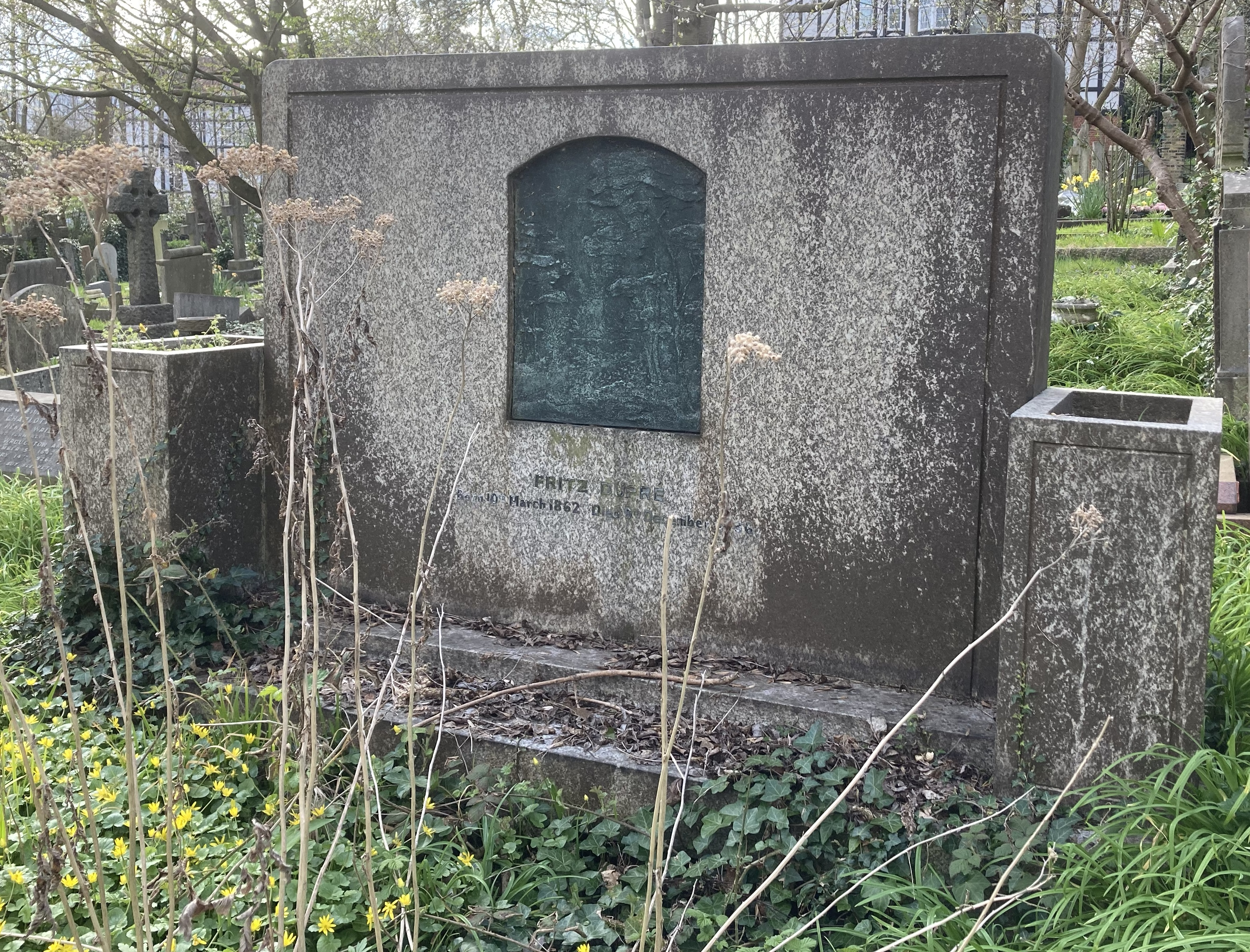
Grave of Fritz Dupre in Highgate Cemetery

Dupré became a naturalised British citizen in 1900. He married Magdalena Eva Elisabeth Hecker ("Else") and they had six children. The family's first home was 2 Clifton Hill, St John's Wood, following which they moved to The Firs, a large 18th century mansion, now listed Grade II, beside Hampstead Heath, near the Spaniards Inn.

They also owned a large holiday house on the esplanade in Frinton-on-Sea, Essex, called Turret Lodge; this had been used as a hospital during the Great War.

Dupré died at The Firs on 9 December 1936 and was buried on the east side of Highgate Cemetery. His estate was valued for probate at £230,519, the equivalent of over £15 million today.
