= Bad Soden-Salmünster station =

Railway station in Bad Soden-Salmünster, Germany

Bad Soden-Salmünster

General information
- Location: Bahnhofstraße 16, Bad Soden-Salmünster, Hesse; Germany
- Coordinates: 50°16′51″N 9°22′20″E
- Owner: DB Netz
- Operator: DB Station&Service
- Line: Frankfurt–Göttingen railway (61.4 km) (KBS 615)
- Platforms: 3
- Train operators: DB Regio Mitte

Construction
- Accessible: Platform 1 only

Other information
- Station code: 0347
- DS100 code: FBSS
- IBNR: 8005261
- Category: 5
- Fare zone: : 3230
- Website: www.bahnhof.de

History
- Opened: 1 July 1868

Passengers
- 5,000

Services
Preceding station	DB Regio Mitte	Following station
Hanau Hbf towards Frankfurt (Main) Hbf	RE 5	Schlüchtern towards Bebra
Wächtersbach towards Frankfurt (Main) Hbf	RE 50	Steinau (Straße) towards Bebra
Location

Bad Soden-Salmunster station is the station of the town of Bad Soden-Salmünster on the Frankfurt–Göttingen railway in the German state of Hesse. The station is classified by Deutsche Bahn (DB) as a category 5 station.

== History ==
The station was opened on 1 July 1868 along with the Wächtersbach–Steinau an der Straße section of the Kinzig Valley Railway. The Kinzig Valley Railway was part of the Frankfurt–Bebra railway, initiated by the Electorate of Hesse, the Grand Duchy of Hesse and Free City of Frankfurt and completed by Prussia. It was originally called Salmunster until 1880, when it was changed to Salmünster-Soden (until 1914) and then Salmünster-Bad Soden (until 1971).

The entrance building is listed as a monument under the Hessian Heritage Act.

== Operations ==
The station has a "house" platform (next to the entrance building) and an island platform. The house platform (platform 1) and track 2 are exclusively used by the hourly Regional-Express services on the Frankfurt–Hanau–Wächtersbach–Fulda route. Track 3, which is located next to platform 2 on the island platform, is served by several regional services each day on the Frankfurt–Hanau–Wächtersbach–Bad Soden-Salmunster route.

The station is served by regional services. Intercity-Express and Intercity services pass through without stopping.
