= Bad Soden-Salmünster =

- Town
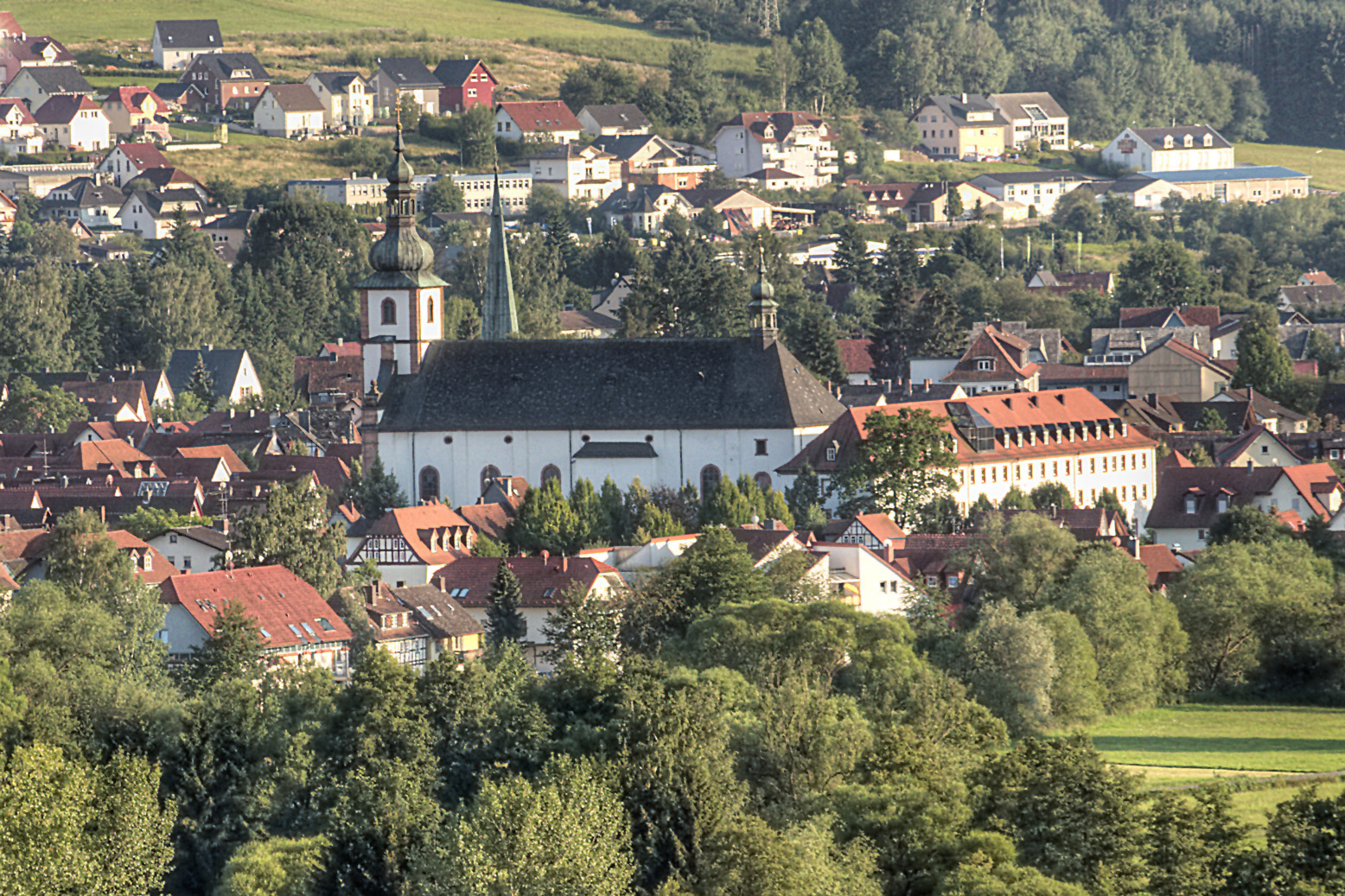
- Salmünster with Saints Peter and Paul Church

- Coat of arms

- Location of Bad Soden-Salmünster within Main-Kinzig-Kreis district
- Interactive map of Bad Soden-Salmünster
- Location within Germany Location within Hesse
- Coordinates: 50°16′N 09°22′E
- Country: Germany
- State: Hesse
- Admin. region: Darmstadt
- District: Main-Kinzig-Kreis

Government
  - Mayor (2024–30): Dominik Brasch

Area
  - Total: 58.59 km^{2} (22.62 sq mi)
- Elevation: 157–450 m (515–1,476 ft)

Population (2025-12-31)
  - Total: 13,653
  - Density: 233.0/km^{2} (603.5/sq mi)
- Time zone: UTC+01:00 (CET)
  - Summer (DST): UTC+02:00 (CEST)
- Postal codes: 63628
- Dialling codes: 06056
- Vehicle registration: MKK
- Website: www.badsoden-salmuenster.de

Bad Soden-Salmünster (German: [baːt ˈzoːdn̩ zaːlˈmʏnstɐ]) is a town in the Main-Kinzig district, in Hesse, Germany. It is situated on the river Kinzig, between Fulda and Hanau. It has a population of around 13,000.

== Geography ==
=== Location ===
The municipality is located on both sides of the Kinzig river in the Main-Kinzig district of Hesse. Its territory extends into the hills of the Vogelsberg to the north and into the Spessart to the south.

The two main population centres, Bad Soden and Salmünster, are both situated in the Kinzig valley.

=== Subdivisions ===
The Stadt (town) Bad Soden-Salmünster today consists of the following 11 Stadtteile (boroughs): Ahl, Alsberg, Bad Soden, Hausen, Eckardroth, Katholisch-Willenroth, Kerbersdorf, Mernes, Romsthal, Salmünster and Wahlert.

Bad Soden and Salmünster are the two Kernstadtteile (core boroughs). The current municipality was created in the Gebietsreform of 1970, 1972 and 1974.

=== Neighbouring communities ===
From the north, clockwise, the neighbouring municipalities are: Birstein, Steinau an der Straße, Gutsbezirk Spessart (an unincorporated area surrounding the Stadtteil of Alfeld), Bad Orb, Wächtersbach and Brachttal. The Stadtteil Mernes is separated from the rest of the municipal territory by the Gutsbezirk Spessart. It also borders on Forst Aura (another unincorporated wooded area and part of the Main-Spessart district of Bavaria) and Jossgrund.

== History ==
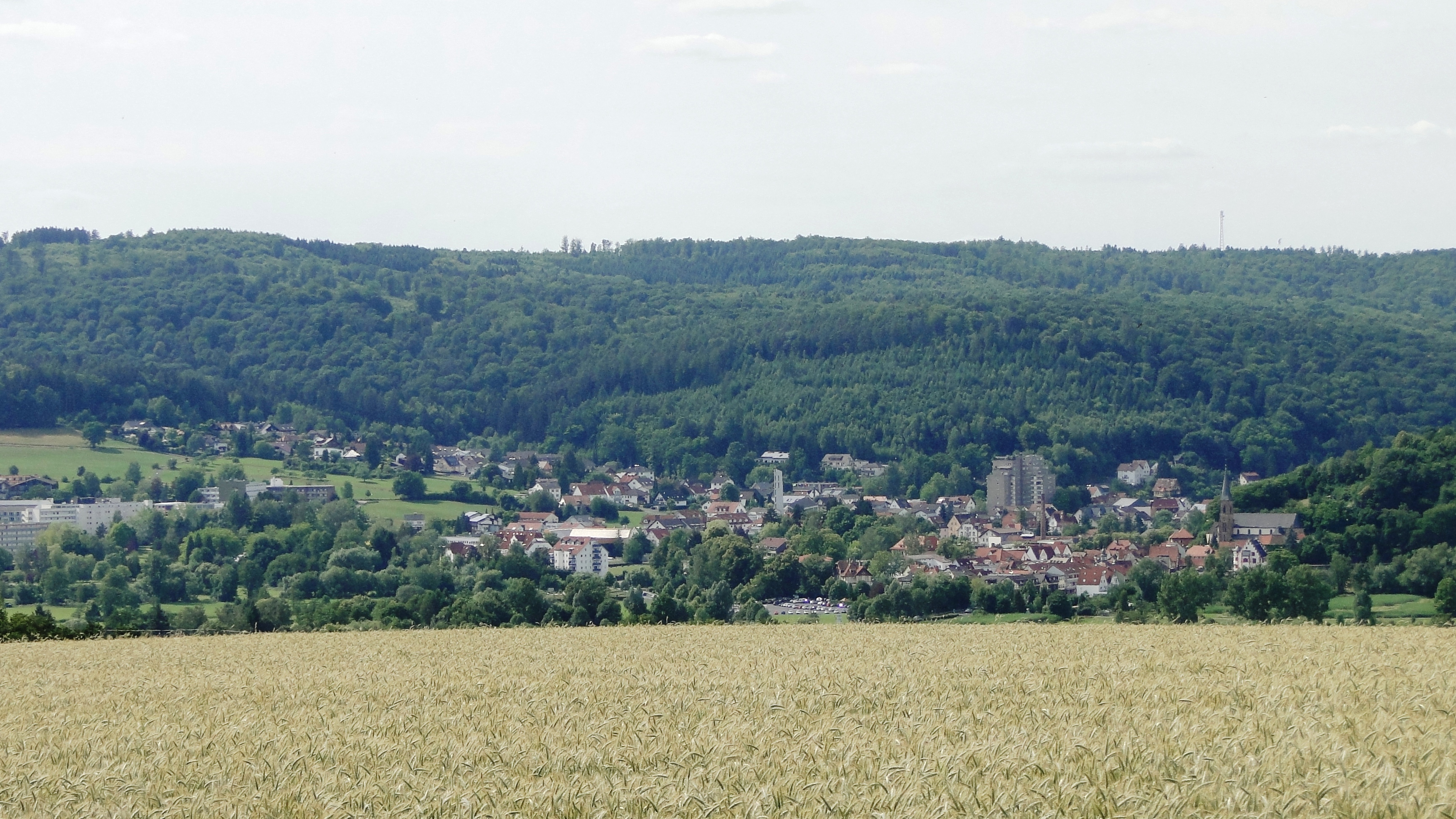
The Stadtteil Bad Soden from the southeast

Salmünster as a settlement likely dates to the 9th century, but is first mentioned in a document from around 1000, as Salchenmunster. Soden, probably created by Fulda Abbey ca. 909, appears in a document from ca. 1190, referred to as Sodin. Around 152, the abbot of Fulda Abbey had Burg Stolzenberg (see below) erected. Town rights were bestowed in 1296 (Soden, but called Stolzenthal) and 1320 (Salmünster), by King Adolf and Emperor Ludwig, respectively. In 1536, the Huttenschloss (see below) was built.

In medieval times, salt works were an important source of local income at Soden. Since the 12th century the water of the local wells, with a high salt and iron content, was used for salt production. The springs and the village were mortgaged by the abbot of Fulda to the lords of Hutten in 1330, who initially lived at Stolzenfels before moving to a new palace in the mid-16th century. When the Hutten family came into financial difficulties, they in turn mortgaged the area to the Archbishop of Mainz. However, the temporal organization of the Archbishopric, the Erzstift, was already running salt works at nearby (Bad) Orb. To avoid internal competition, salt production at Soden was ended in the later 16th century.

The salt well (Barbarossaquelle) was rediscovered in 1837, and in 1838 Robert Bunsen conducted an analysis of the well's water. In 1872, Soden was granted permission to use the wells for a spa. The first Kurhaus (spa building) was erected in 1889, by which time the region had become a part of the Kingdom of Prussia. Soden has been a Heilbad (spa) and therefore called "Bad Soden" since 1928.

=== Creation of the current town ===
The current town was created only on 1 July 1974 when the towns of Salmünster and Bad Soden bei Salmünster merged. During earlier Gebietsreformen, as of 1 December 1970 Wahlert had become a part of Bad Soden. Ahl and Eckardroth followed on 1 April 1972. Alsberg and Hausen were merged with Salmünster on 1 January 1970 followed by Kerbersdorf and Romsthal on 1 December 1970 and Katholisch-Willenroth on 1 July 1972.

Since 1974, the town has been part of the Main-Kinzig district, it was previously part of the Schlüchtern district.

== Government ==
The mayor is Dominik Brasch.

== Notable buildings ==
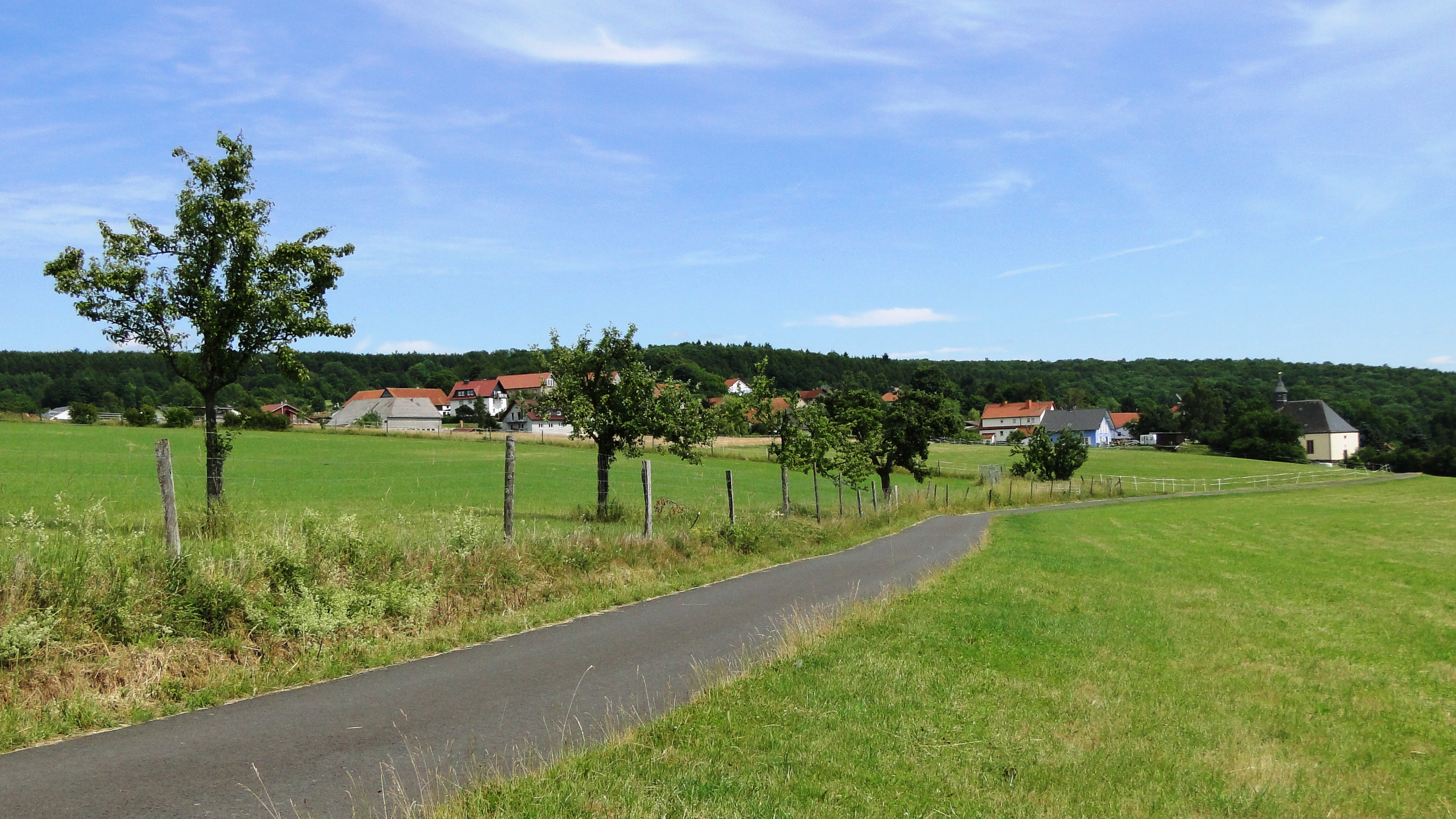
The Stadtteil of Alsberg, a hill village (Höhendorf) from the northwest; the Wallfahrtskirche Heilig Kreuz on the right

- Burg Stolzenberg - ruin of a medieval hill castle to the northeast of Bad Soden. It was destroyed in the Thirty Years' War by Croatian troops serving the Emperor, commanded by Johann Ludwig Hektor von Isolani.
- Huttenschloss Bad Soden - a town castle built around 1536 by Lukas von Hutten
- St. Peter und Paul (Salmünster) - the current Baroque parish church was built in 1737–45. It is part of the ensemble of the Franciscan monastery at Salmünster.
- Schloss Hausen (Bad Soden) - the original castle was first mentioned in 1540. Under Daniel Brendel von Homburg it was rebuilt into a small Schloss. Today, it serves as a youth hostel and is not open to the public.
- St. Laurentius - Gothic revival church at Bad Soden
- Wallfahrtskirche Heiliges Kreuz - small church at Alsberg
- Mernes water works - water works built in 1914 by the Prussians to supply water to the military training area between Bad Orb and Jossgrund. It was bought in 1952 by the city of Frankfurt, when it once again took over the summer camp at Wegscheide (see Stalag IX-B). The Mernes works long supplied water to the camp until it was replaced with a new water line from Bad Orb. Mernes still uses water pumped from the works.
- Parish church St. Peter at Mernes, with late Gothic crucifixion group from the workshop of Tilman Riemenschneider

== Infrastructure ==
=== Transport ===
The town has direct access to the Autobahn 66 from Frankfurt to Fulda. It is linked to the rail network by the Bad Soden-Salmünster station (located in the Stadtteil of Salmünster).

=== Utilities ===
At Ahl, the Kinzig is dammed by the Kinzigtalsperre, which serves both to control floods and to generate hydroelectric power.

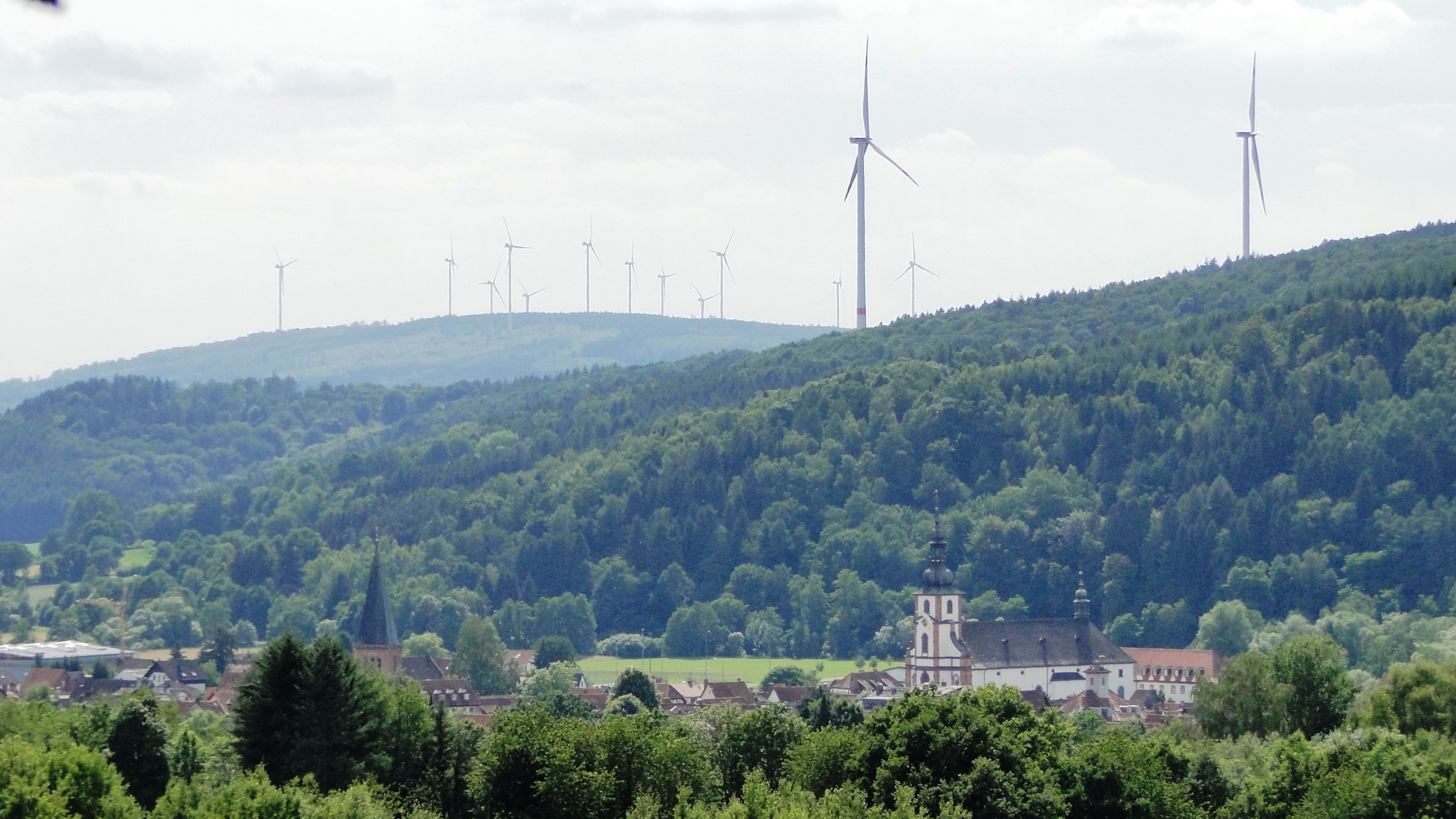
A view of Salmünster with the wind farms located in the neighbouring Wächtersbach municipality

Like in other communities in the area, such as Biebergemünd, Flörsbachtal, Bad Orb and Jossgrund, there is currently controversy over plans to build additional towering wind farms on the wooded peaks. A number of these have already been built in the neighbouring town of Wächtersbach very close to the municipal boundary. Environmentalists and many locals reject these plans due to the destruction of forests and animal habitats, possible health risks to residents, as well as threats to local property values and, in particular, to the tourism business as a result of a declining attractiveness of the region to visitors. It is also questioned whether local winds are strong and constant enough to allow economical operation of the wind farms.

== Notable residents ==
- Fritz Dupre (1862-1936), iron and manganese ore merchant, known as the "Manganese Ore King"
- Kurt Lamm (1919–87), footballer, coach, manager, and administrator
- Joseph Müller (1894-1944), priest
- Manuel Marburger (born 1973), industrial climber
