= Brachttal =

- Municipality
- Coat of arms

- Location of Brachttal within Main-Kinzig-Kreis district
- Interactive map of Brachttal
- Location within Germany Location within Hesse
- Coordinates: 50°18′12″N 9°17′52″E
- Country: Germany
- State: Hesse
- Admin. region: Darmstadt
- District: Main-Kinzig-Kreis
- Subdivisions: 6 districts

Government
  - Mayor (2022–28): Wolfram Zimmer

Area
  - Total: 30.85 km^{2} (11.91 sq mi)
- Elevation: 157–315 m (515–1,033 ft)

Population (2025-12-31)
  - Total: 4,788
  - Density: 155.2/km^{2} (402.0/sq mi)
- Time zone: UTC+01:00 (CET)
  - Summer (DST): UTC+02:00 (CEST)
- Postal codes: 63636
- Dialling codes: 06053 and 06054
- Vehicle registration: MKK
- Website: www.gemeinde-brachttal.de

Brachttal is a municipality in the Main-Kinzig district, in Frankfurt Rhine-Main in Hesse, Germany.

== Districts ==
The Bracht, a tributary of the Kinzig, flows through the Tal (valley) so the municipality got the name Brachttal.

Brachttal consists of six parts:

- Schlierbach
- Neuenschmidten
- Hellstein
- Spielberg
- Udenhain
- Streitberg

Schlierbach is the biggest part of Brachttal and also the most populous. The administration and the tourist information of Brachttal (Gemeindeverwaltung Brachttal) are located in Schlierbach.

Schlierbach is well known for its ceramic manufacture, the Waechtersbach ceramics. Next to the manufacture there is a tegut-market, the only supermarket in Brachttal.

In Spielberg and Streitberg there are ceramic museums. In Neuenschmidten is Schloss Eisenhammer and an old big oak with a scope of 7.88 meters (25.853 ft) in 2014. Today the Schloss is empty.

The famous Vogelsberger Südbahnradweg leads through Schlierbach and Hellstein. This cycle track is built on a closed railway, the Vogelsberger Südbahn which was a rail connection between Wächtersbach and Hartmannshain.

There is a buslinie to Schlierbach which starts at Wächtersbach station. The bus stop Schlierbach Rathaus is in front of the administration (Gemeindeverwaltung Brachttal). More information is available by the Rhein-Main-Verkehrsverbund.

== Politics ==
=== Sister cities ===
- Rybachy, Russia – since March 2015

== Coordinates/Maps of POI ==
- Administration/Tourist Information of Brachttal (Gemeindeverwaltung Brachttal): 50.303001°N 9.298066°E
- Ceramics museum Spielberg: 50.308334°N 9.270442°E
- Ceramics museum Streitberg: 50.323126°N 9.257525°E
- Waechtersbach ceramics factory outlet: 50.303104°N 9.301107°E
- Schloss Eisenhammer: 50.321491°N 9.283791°E
- Big old oak: 50.31942°N 9.28474°E
- Public kneipp basin: 50.320582°N 9.281455°E
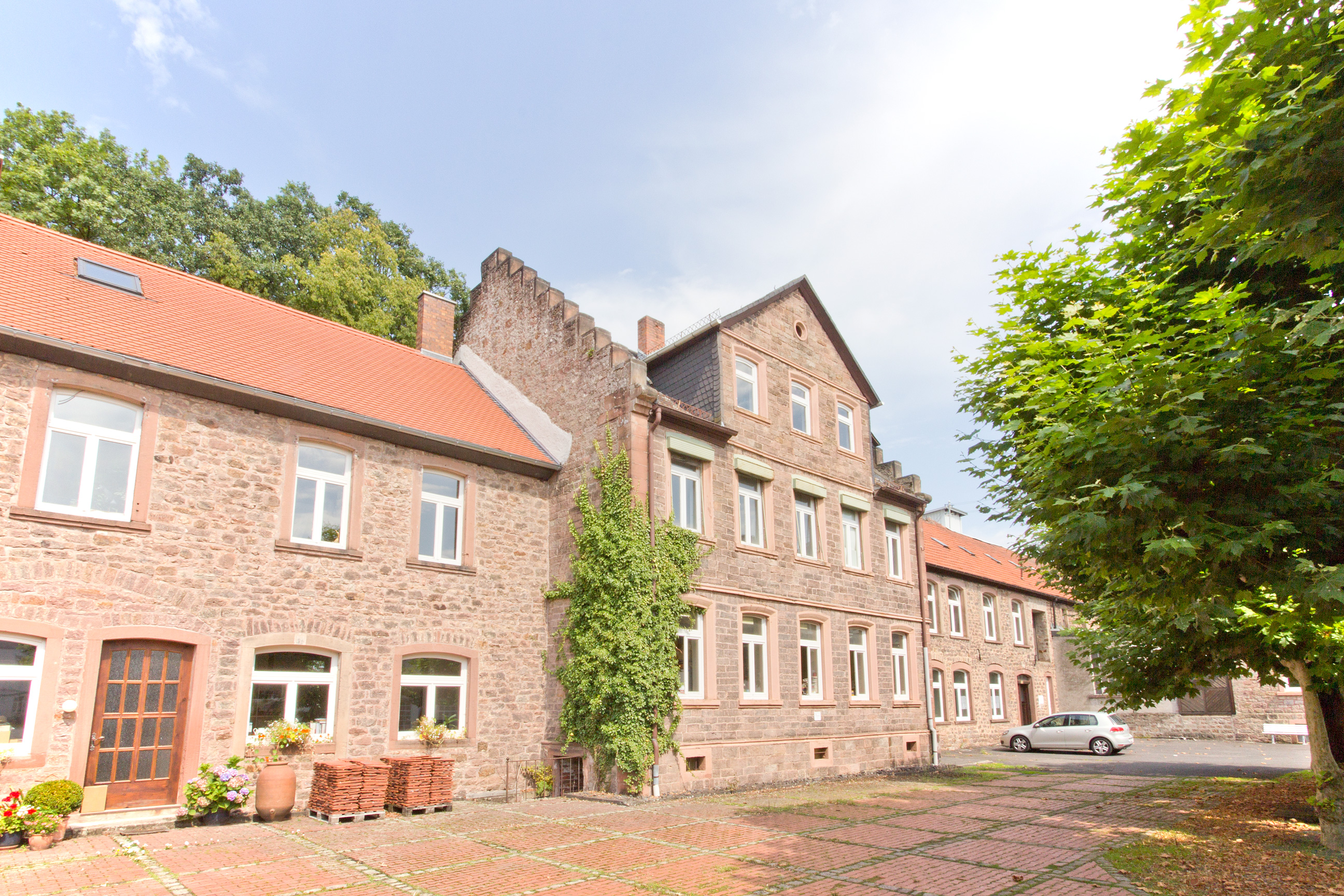
Waechtersbach ceramics - ceramic manufacture

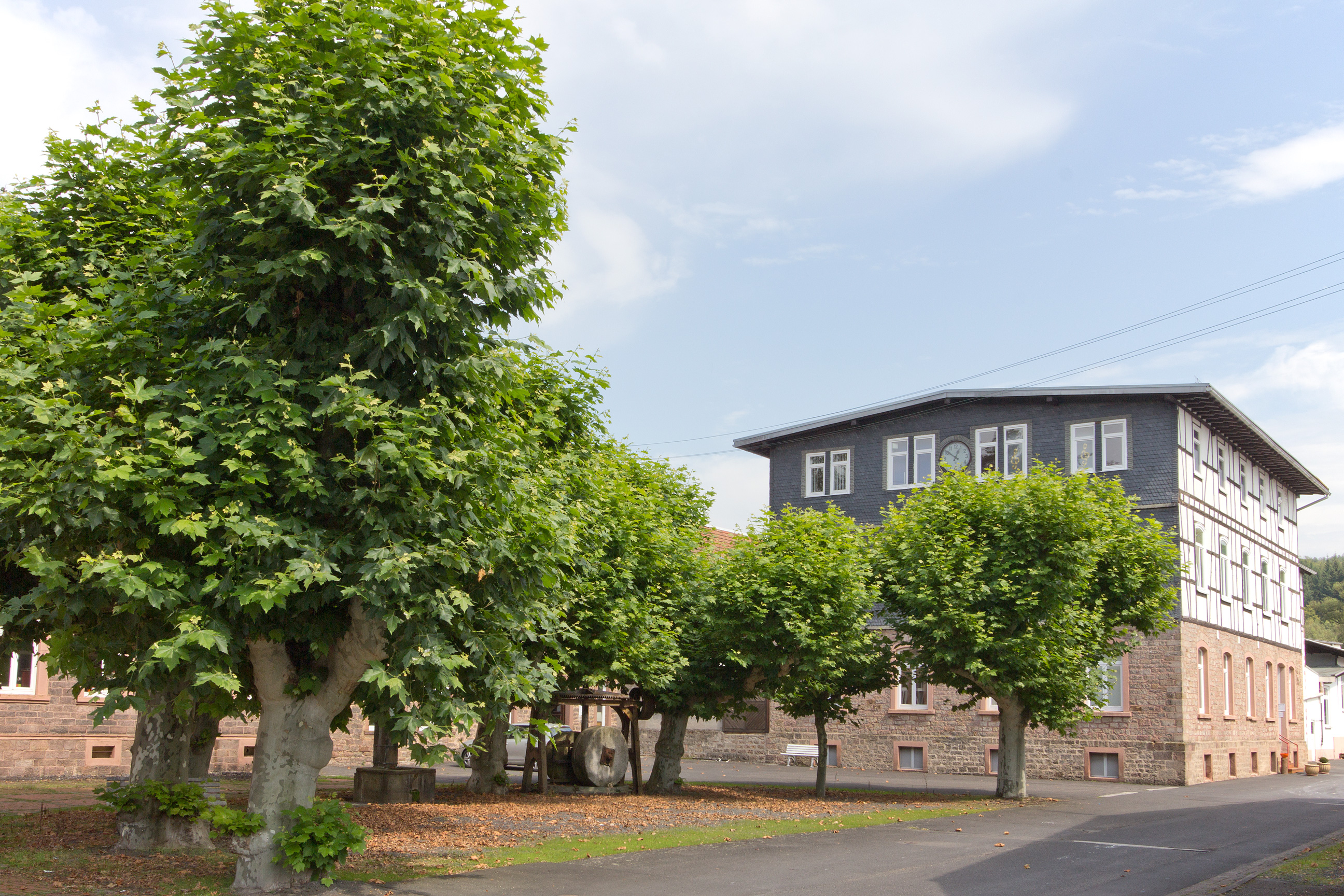
Waechtersbach ceramics - administration buildings

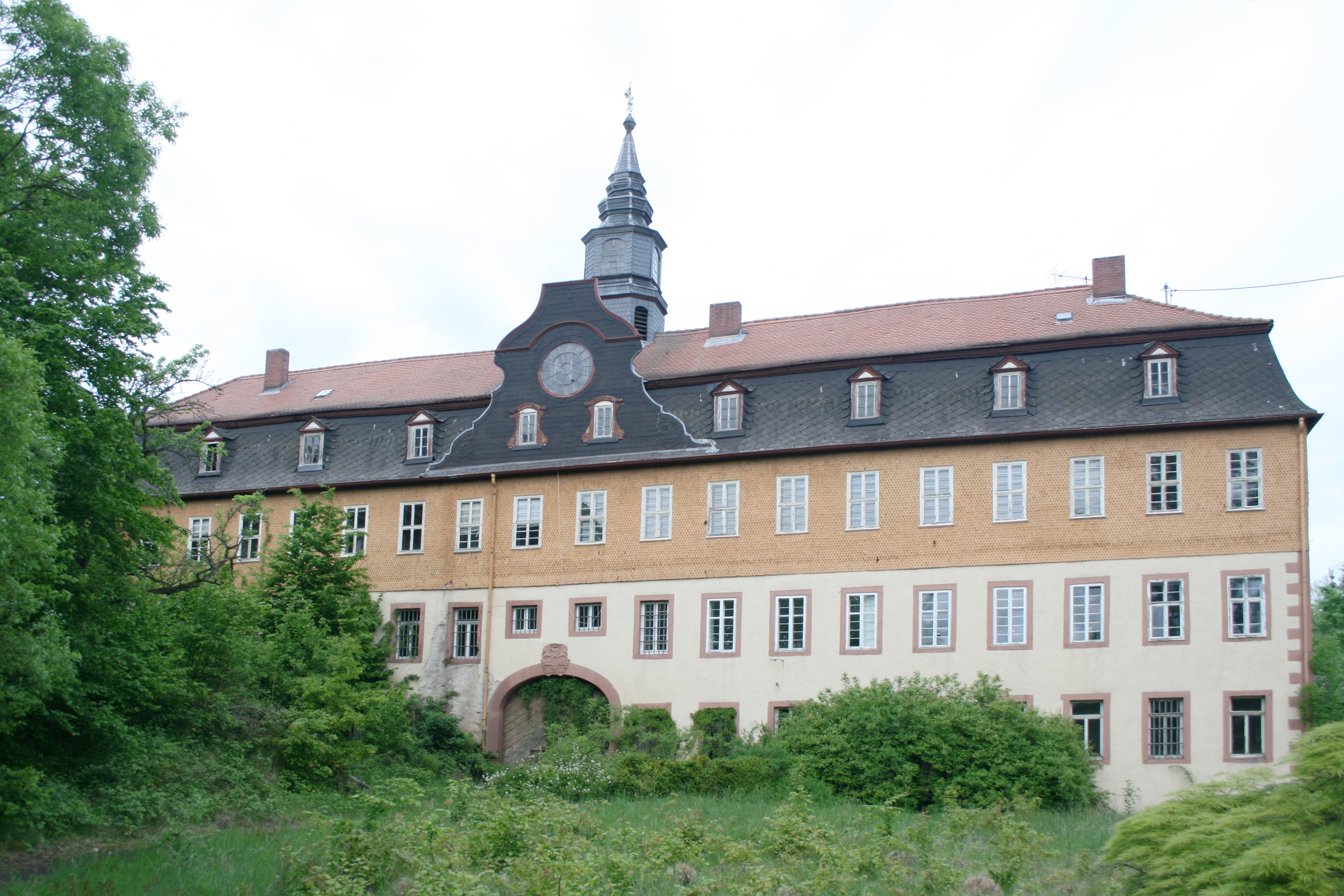
Schloss Eisenhammer in Neuenschmidten

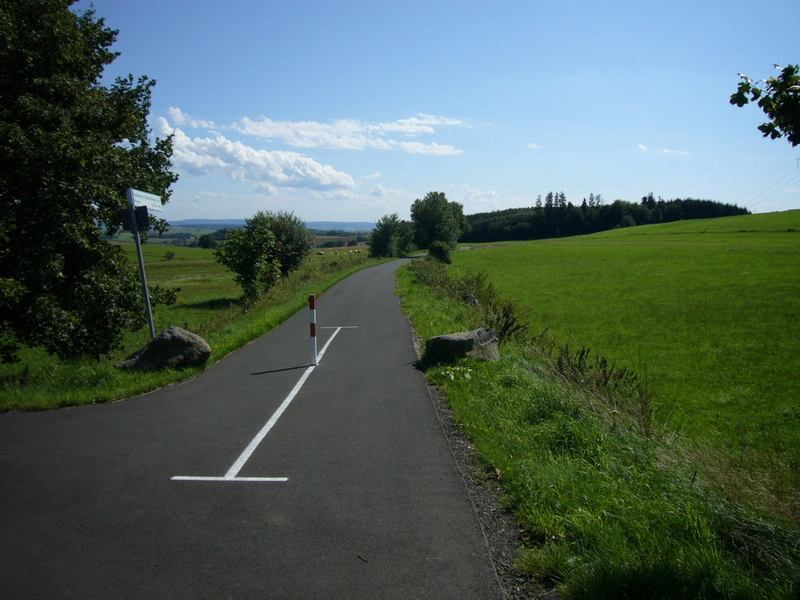
The Vogelsberger Südbahnradweg

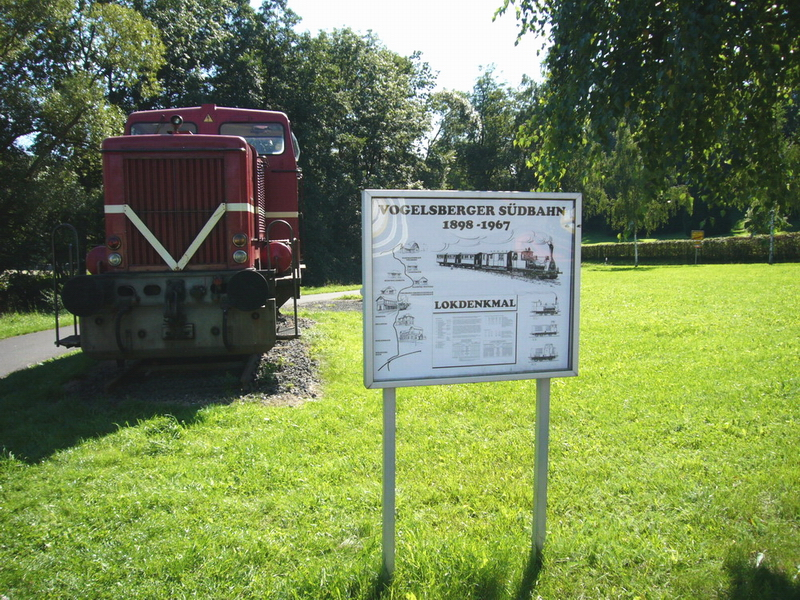
The old locomotive in Birstein next to the cycle track
