= Waechtersbach ceramics =

German ceramics manufacturer

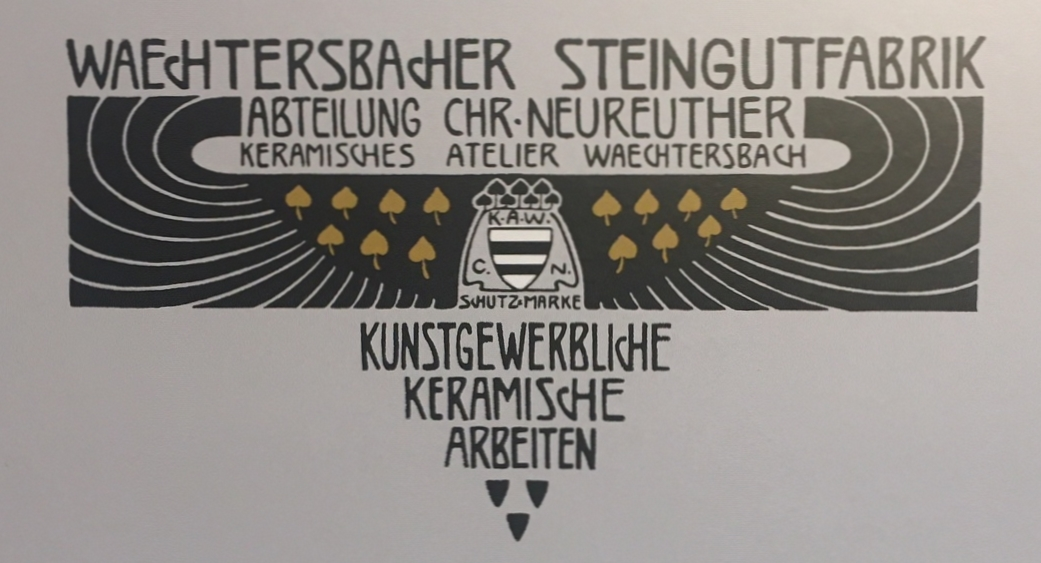
- Company type: Registered company
- Industry: Ceramics
- Founded: 1832
- Founder: Prince Adolf of Ysenburg and Büdingen
- Defunct: 2011
- Headquarters: Brachttal, near Wächtersbach, Hesse, Germany
- Area served: Germany
- Products: Ceramics, Art Nouveau ceramics
- Parent: Könitz Porzellan (from 2006)

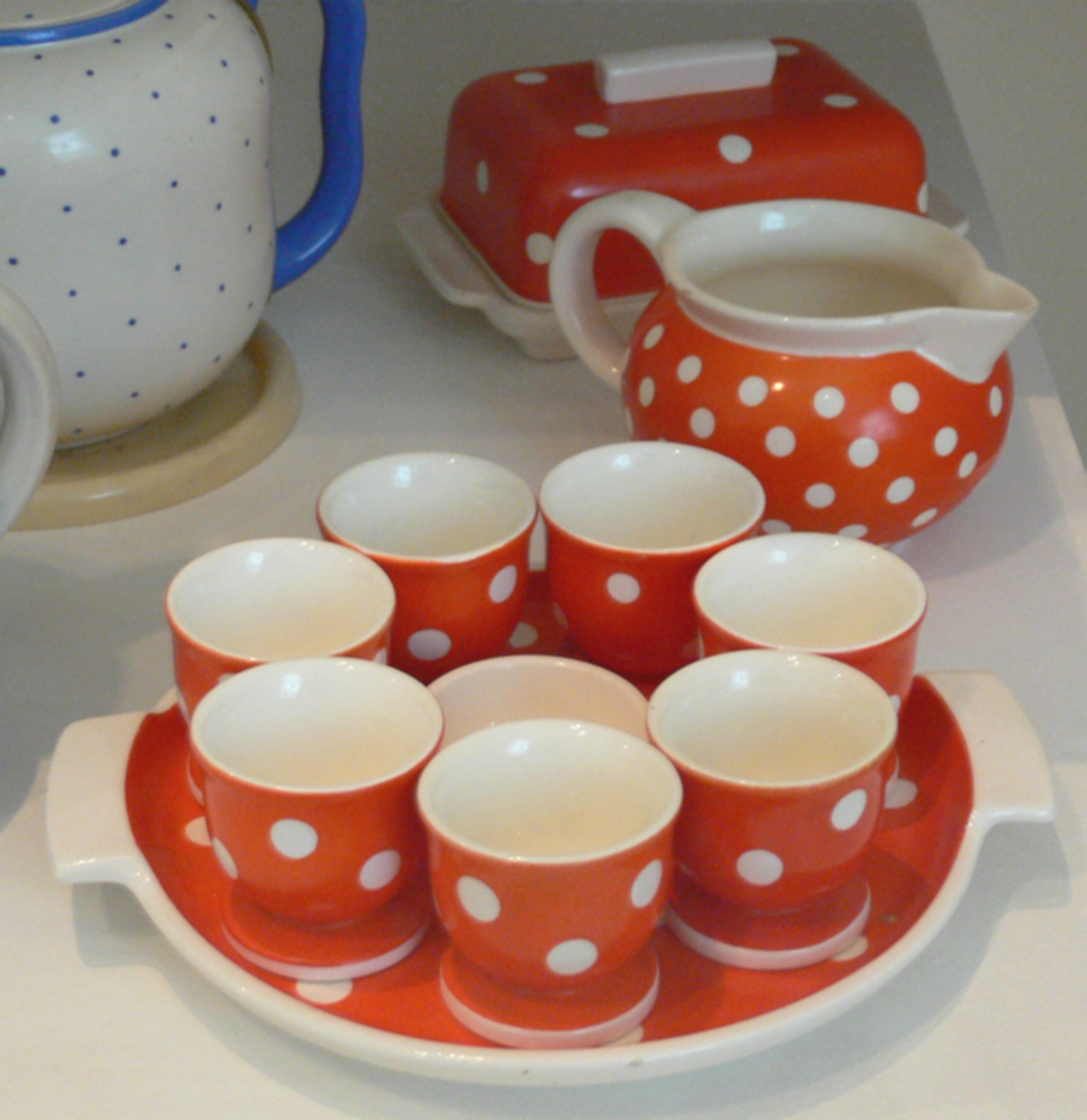
Waechtersbach egg cup from the 1930s

Waechtersbach ceramics is a German ceramics manufacturer in Brachttal near Wächtersbach, which was founded in 1832 by the Prince Adolf of Ysenburg and Büdingen of Isenburg-Wächtersbach. It is a registered company since 4 July 2003.

== Products ==
During the early 20th century, Waechtersbach introduced Art Nouveau style ceramics. It made works designed by Joseph Maria Olbrich, Peter Behrens, Hans Christiansen and also worked for the Darmstadt Artists' Colony.

- In 2006, it became part of the Könitz Porzellan company.
- In 2011, it was closed.
- Since 2013, there is a show production for interested people.
- In Spielberg and Streitberg (both are villages in Brachttal) there are ceramic museums with ceramic art made by Waechtersbach ceramics.

== See also ==
- Nikko Ceramics
- Arzberg porcelain
