= Weimar Porzellan =

Weimarer Porzellanmanufaktur Betriebs-GmbH
- Type: GmbH
- Industry: Porcelain
- Founded: 1790
- Headquarters: Blankenhain, Thüringen
- Key people: Turpin Rosenthal, executive director

Weimar Porzellanmanufaktur, or Weimar Porzellan (English: Weimar porcelain) is a German company that has been manufacturing porcelain in Weimar since 1790. It has been a subsidiary of the Könitz Group since its acquisition in 2007.

== Timeline ==
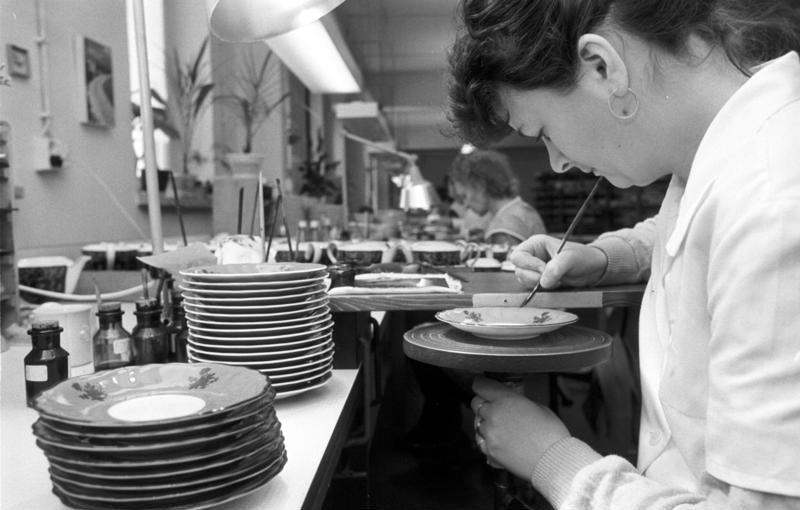

Year	Occurrence
1790	Established by Christian Andreas Speck
1797	First products presented at the Leipzig Trade Fair
1830	Takeover by Gustav Vogt
1836	Sold to Gottfried Sorge, soon followed by bankruptcy
1841	Streitbarth and Köstner co-operation
1847	Sold to Fasolt after period in which factory was closed down
1856	Partnership with Eduard Eichler
1917	Ernst Carstens purchases the factory
1928	Registered trademark "Weimar Porzellan"
1948	Nationalisation and inclusion into the state-owned "Kombinat Feinkeramik Kahla"
1992	Purchase by Herbert Hillebrand Bauverwaltungs-Gesellschaft mbH
1995	Bankruptcy and purchase by the town of Blankenhain, British American Ltd. and Optima Immobilien GmbH
2006	Renewed purchase by Hillebrand
2007	Purchase by Könitz Porzellan GmbH, owned by Turpin Rosenthal

== History ==
=== The Launching of Weimar Porzellan ===
June 8, 1790 - The manufacturer and ceramists Christian Andreas Speck asked Friedrich Graf von Hatzfeld in Blankenhain to build a porcelain factory. July 1, 1790 - the license to produce porcelain in Blankenhain was approved by Count Friedrich von Hatzfeld in Vienna. The fire-proof production site was to be built in 1780 in the shooting building which Speck had bought. The argillaceous earth necessary for producing china clay was brought from Tannroda, the quartz-feldspar sand came from Schwarza and the vicinity of Blankenhain. The mass was ground and elutriated in the factory's own mill on Seeteich.

The conditions for manufacturing porcelain were excellent and remained a constant during political upheaval. Only after the Battle of Leipzig in 1813 and after the Congress of Vienna, political stability returned. Speck was able to form an agreement with the respective magistrates in order that their porcelain production was unaffected. In 1797, Speck presented the first porcelain products at the Leipzig Fair. In the early 19th century tableware for the middle classes and typically "ordinary goods" were manufactured and by 1816, Speck employed 155 workers. In 1817 the factory nearly burned down completely and great efforts were made to press ahead with its reconstruction. Christian Andreas Speck died at the age of 69 on December 30 of that year.

=== Period of Instability ===
After the death of Christian Andreas Speck, Landkammerrat Gustav Vogt bought the factory. It is not known how much he knew about porcelain manufacturing, but he relied on the well intentioned employees whom Christian Andreas Speck had left behind. In March 1836, Vogt sold the porcelain factory to Gottfried Sorge for 17,000 Reichstaler, presumably due to a lack of specialised and qualified personnel. Sorge had paid much more for the porcelain factory than it was actually worth and as a result he soon was forced to register for bankruptcy. Gustav Vogt bought back the factory from Sorge, in order to sell it for 8,300 thalers to a Mr. Streitbarth. In 1841 Streitbarth and a Mr. H. Kästner formed an associated venture called Weimar. Together they improved the production routines but it was a time just before the bourgeois revolution, when the economic climate for such undertakings were far from favourable. In 1847 Streitbarth and Kästner temporarily shut down the factory before they sold Weimar Porzellan to the Fasolt Family.

=== The Fasolt & Eichler Period ===
The Fasolt family from Selb arrived in Blankenhain and began by modernising the company. In 1856, after the death of Viktor Fasolt, his widow Elisabeth took over the business. In 1879, she passed the management control to her sons, Max and Karl Fasolt. Elisabeth had maintained an ambiguous relationship with the porcelain entrepreneur Edward Eichler, who was also involved in the running of the factory from 1856 onwards. Some important events during this phase included: the new Saxon rhomb trademark was introduced; three large new furnaces for annealing and glost were built: and a new steam engine was purchased to operate the mill on the large factory floor. Other innovations and measures to modernise took place during this period, which was characterized by an ever-increasing degree of mechanisation of operations. An important element was the establishment of a railway line between Blankenhain and Weimar in 1887; this provided a major advantage for the factory, which by that time had already been producing mainly large quantities of porcelain goods. So in 1879 with transport costing less and production numbers steadily increasing, sons Max and Karl Fasolt took over the running of the company.

In 1900 the word "GERMANY" was added to the factory's rhomb trademark to reinforce the company's image as an exporter. During this time, the production numbers increased consistently and the factory became well renowned for producing excellent quality porcelain. The collaboration with Eichler proved to be a success and the increasing influence of the Dux Porcelain Manufacturer was also paying off. Technical experience, staff and models were exchanged and constraints on supply could be avoided. As one would expect, both businesses suffered a setback with the outbreak of World War I; exports dropped away and employees were called to the front line.

=== Takeover of the Factory by the Carstens Family ===
In 1917, towards the end of World War I, Hamburg businessman Ernst Carstens acquired the porcelain factory in Blankenhain from Duxer Porzellanmanufaktur AG. As soon as he took over the operation, naming it: "E. Carstens KG", he added a crown and a laurel wreath to the company trademark in order to herald in a new era. Everything at that time was a challenge, raw materials and fuel were hard to obtain, the export markets had to be rebuilt, inflation was devastating and there were 300 workers and 20 employees on the payroll. By stylistic innovation of the supplies and a price adjustment for the benefit of the customers, the Carstens family managed to revive the export markets. The name Carstens is connected with the introduction of the famous Weimar cobalt paintings on porcelain. As early as 1926, cobalt porcelain was being produced in Blankenhain, which was probably due to the good contacts Carstens had with Bohemia. To this day this refinement of the white ceramic material is still regarded as a specialist skill. The precious festive cobalt blue gives the material a unique aura, especially when decorated with delicate ornaments in gold. To collectors the products of this period are often known Carstens China. Carstens followed the artistic trends of Art Nouveau and adjusted production to suit the customer's wishes. At that time, china from Weimar was known and appreciated for its style in England, Belgium, Finland, the Netherlands, Spain, Switzerland, America and the Middle East.

In 1928, the trademark was registered Weimar Porzellan. It's worth mentioning that around this time there were recurrent strikes in the history of Weimar Porzellan. Carstens led his company in quite a strict and rigid fashion in order to stay operational during the Great Depression and the workers were the ones who paid for extremely low but necessary export prices. The longest strike in 1929 lasted for three months. Eva Zeisel is a famous designer who worked for Carstens in the 1930s. After the death of Carstens, his widow and two sons ran the factory until it was confiscated and nationalised by the Soviets in July 1948, the year before the official establishment of East Germany.

=== The People's Own Business ===
As a state-owned enterprise, the company's aim was to build a highly efficient and modern production facility with resulting large investments in buildings, machinery and equipment. For example funding was made available for the following improvements: a new production hall (1962), a modern electro-cobalt furnaces (1963) and the shift to conveyor belt-production in the spinning department (1963–65). Due to the integration with fine ceramics Kahla, Blankenhain lost its independence as a porcelain factory. Besides the benefits of belonging to a large conglomerate and collective, the artistic creativity suffered. The artistic style of production was adjusted mainly to serving the tastes of the eastern export markets which meant a return to classical forms and patterns in order not to lose the foreign currency from these markets.

=== The period After the Reunification ===
In 1992, the Company Herbert Hillebrand Bauverwaltungs-Gesellschaft GmbH, based in Kerpen-Horrem, acquired the porcelain factory from the THA Erfurt and continued as "Weimar Porzellan GmbH ", being "the Hillebrand family company" until spring 1995. In April 1995 bankruptcy was filed and until June 1995 Weimar Porzellan was run by a liquidator. In June 1995 the city of Blankenhain, together with British American Ltd. and Optima Immobilien GmbH bought shares from the bankrupt Weimar Porzellan. British American Ltd. and Optima Immobilien GmbH sold their shares during the years 1995/1996 to three leading company officers (the officers for finance, sales and production), who then held a 51% stake of the shares. The city of Blankenhain was still holding 49% of Weimar Porzellan. In 2006 Geschwister Hillebrand GmbH re-acquired Weimar Porzellan, with Kathrin Hillebrand and the 3 officers who were already in the 1995-1996 executive board becoming the Managing Directors.

=== Sale to Könitz Porzellan GmbH ===
In January 2007, Könitz Porzellan GmbH bought Weimar Porzellan. Managing Director and owner of the company today is Turpin Rosenthal, who represents the 6th generation of his family to be actively involved in the china industry.

== See also ==
- Company-own historical overview (in English)
- C. & E. Carstens: photos and details (in German)
- Detailed history and timeline (in German)
- Carstens: Georgenthal factory, photos and details (in German)
