= Grebenhain =

- Municipality
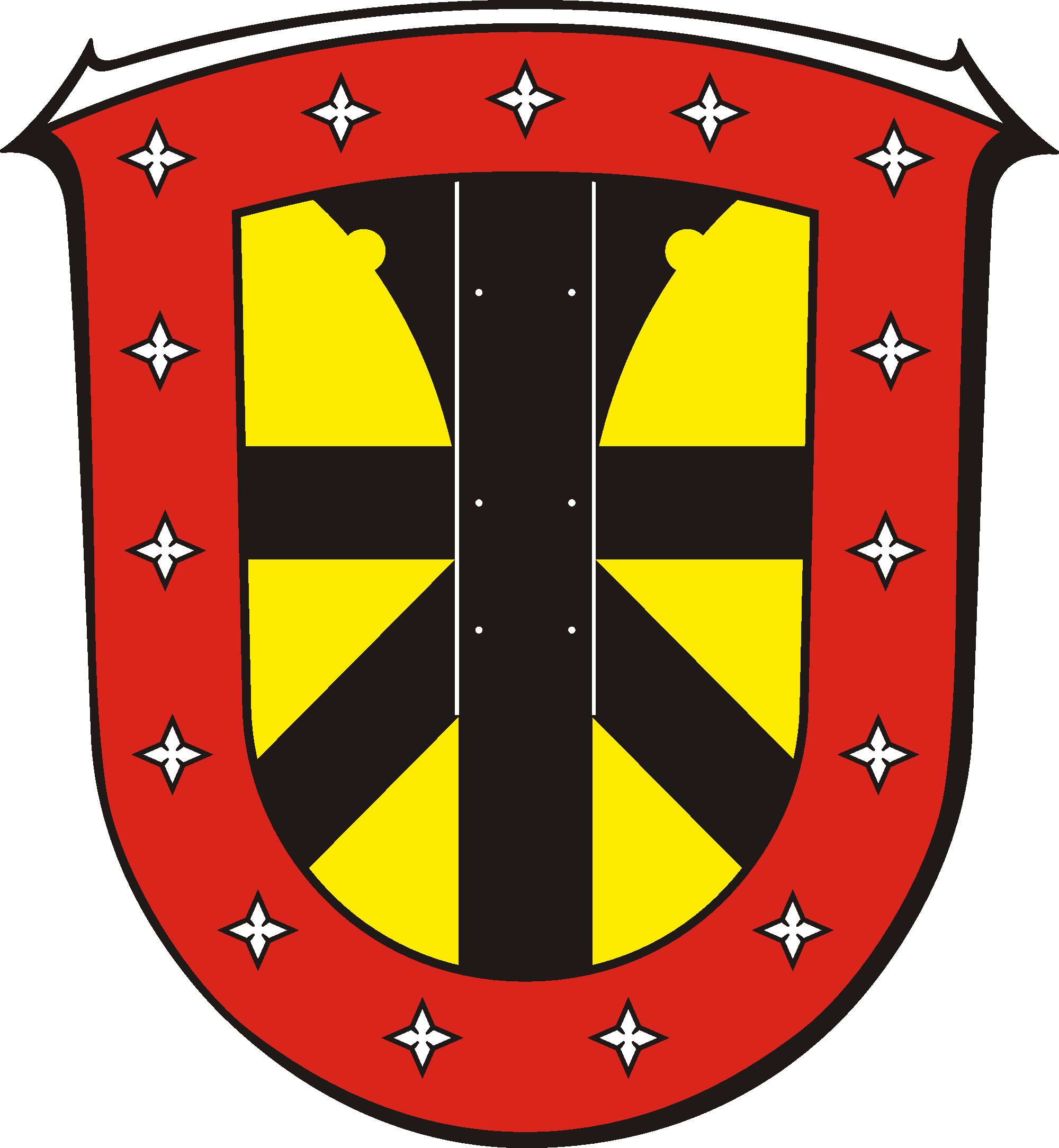
- Coat of arms

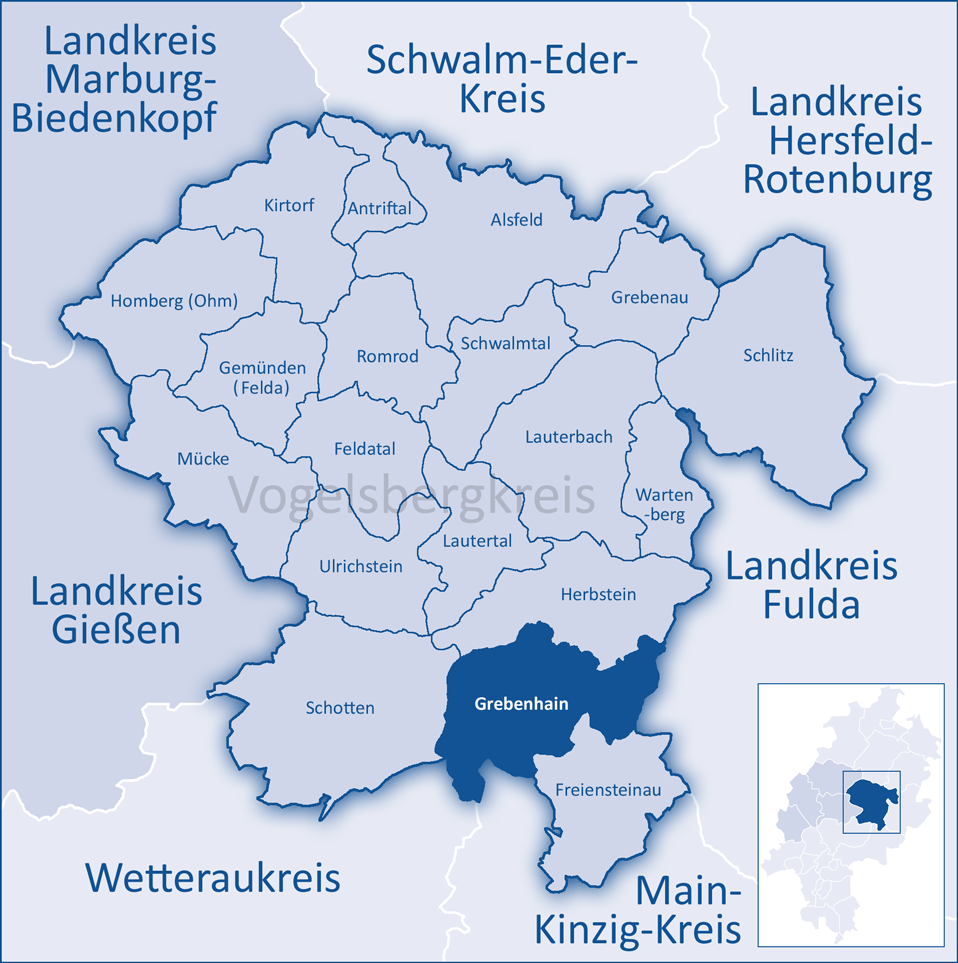
- Location of Grebenhain within Vogelsbergkreis district
- Interactive map of Grebenhain
- Location within Germany Location within Hesse
- Coordinates: 50°29′N 09°21′E
- Country: Germany
- State: Hesse
- Admin. region: Gießen
- District: Vogelsbergkreis

Government
  - Mayor (2019–25): Sebastian Stang

Area
  - Total: 91.62 km^{2} (35.37 sq mi)
- Elevation: 467 m (1,532 ft)

Population (2025-12-31)
  - Total: 4,420
  - Density: 48.2/km^{2} (125/sq mi)
- Time zone: UTC+01:00 (CET)
  - Summer (DST): UTC+02:00 (CEST)
- Postal codes: 36355
- Dialling codes: 06644, 06643, 06668
- Vehicle registration: VB
- Website: www.gemeinde-grebenhain.de

Grebenhain (German pronunciation: [ˈɡʁeːbn̩ˌhaɪn]) is a municipality in the Vogelsbergkreis in Hesse, Germany.

== Geography ==
=== Location ===
The municipality of Grebenhain lies at an elevation ranging from 400 to 733 m (1,312 to 2405 ft) above sea level. It is situated in the southeastern Vogelsberg Mountains, about 30 km west of Fulda, in the Hoher Vogelsberg Nature Park (Naturpark Vulkanregion Vogelsberg).

=== Neighbouring municipalities ===
Grebenhain borders the town of Herbstein to the north, the municipality of Hosenfeld (Fulda district) to the east, the municipalities of Freiensteinau and Birstein (Main-Kinzig-Kreis) to the south, the town of Gedern (Wetteraukreis) to the southwest, and the town of Schotten to the west.

=== Constituent municipalities ===
The municipality consists of 15 formerly independent villages: Bannerod, Bermuthshain, Crainfeld, Grebenhain (administrative seat), Hartmannshain, Herchenhain, Ilbeshausen-Hochwaldhausen, Metzlos, Metzlos-Gehaag, Nösberts-Weidmoos, Vaitshain, Volkartshain, and the constituent parts of Steigertal (Heisters, Wünschen-Moos, Zahmen).

== History ==
The area nowadays occupied by the greater municipality of Grebenhain in the Vogelsberg was likely settled by waves of settlers from the Wetterau between the eighth and eleventh centuries as part of the expansion carried out in the High Middle Ages by the Abbots of Fulda.

The oldest place in today's municipal area is Crainfeld, which was alluded to as early as the ninth century in a Fulda donation announcement. The first definite and verifiable mention of Crainfeld, however, is in a king's document from 1012, which also mentions Bermuthshain and Ilbeshausen in a document for the first time.

Crainfeld advantageously lay at the crossroads of two important mediaeval trade roads, and was moreover until 1821 the seat of a court district, witnessed even today by the Edelhof, the Amt building used by the Oberschultheißen (roughly "sheriffs") when the Landgraves held sway in Hesse. The stately half-timbered house was built in 1685 by carpenter Hans Muth from Ilbeshausen. Hans Muth also built the Hansenmühle (or "Teufelsmühle" – "Devil's Mill") in Ilbeshausen in 1691, one of the loveliest half-timbered buildings in Upper Hesse. Crainfeld is furthermore still the seat of the parish even today. Until the State Highway (Staatsstraße), today's Bundesstraße 275, was built in 1834-1857, and the railway line in 1901-1906 through the neighbouring municipality of Grebenhain, Crainfeld was the region's main town.

The municipalities of Crainfeld, Grebenhain, Bermuthshain and Ilbeshausen have been Hessian since 1437 and formed until 1821 the court district of Crainfeld, which belonged to the Hessian Amt of Nidda. From 1852, they belonged to the Lauterbach district. The municipalities of Hartmannshain and Herchenhain have likewise been Hessian since 1437 and belonged to the court district of Burkhards. Until 1938, they were part of the Schotten district. The municipalities of Bannerod, Heisters, Zahmen, Wünschenmoos, Vaitshain, Nösberts, Weidmoos, Metzlos-Gehaag and Metzlos belonged until 1806 to the court districts of Altenschlirf and Moos, held by the Riedesel family. When the Riedesel state was mediatized, they became Hessian. The municipality of Volkartshain was until 1806 owned by the Counts of Stolberg-Gedern.

The main municipality of Grebenhain had its first documentary mention in a Riedesel document in 1338. Until the fifteenth century, iron ore was mined there, which is recalled today in the names Am Eisenberg (a hall) and Eisenbergsweg (a street), Eisen being German for "iron". In the west of the village, there was until 1789 a large manorial pond.

As part of Hesse's municipal reforms, the 13 formerly independent municipalities of Bannerod, Bermuthshain, Crainfeld, Grebenhain, Hartmannshain, Herchenhain, Ilbeshausen-Hochwaldhausen, Metzlos, Metzlos-Gehaag, Nösberts-Weidmoos, Steigertal (Heisters, Wünschenmoos, Zahmen), Vaitshain and Volkartshain had to merge on 1 January and 1 August 1972 into the greater municipality of Grebenhain.

== Economy ==
The economy of Grebenhain is characterized by a mix of small and medium-sized enterprises (Handwerk und Mittelstand).

=== Notable Enterprises ===
- Vogelsbergklinik in Ilbeshausen-Hochwaldhausen now part of Dr. Ebel Fachkliniken
- HR Structures in Grebenhain-Oberwald

historical:

- STI in Grebenhain Oberwald - closed
- Robbe Modellsport in Metzlos-Gehaag - closed
- Saunalux in Nösberts-Weidmoos - closed
