= Robbe =

Robbe Boerekamp
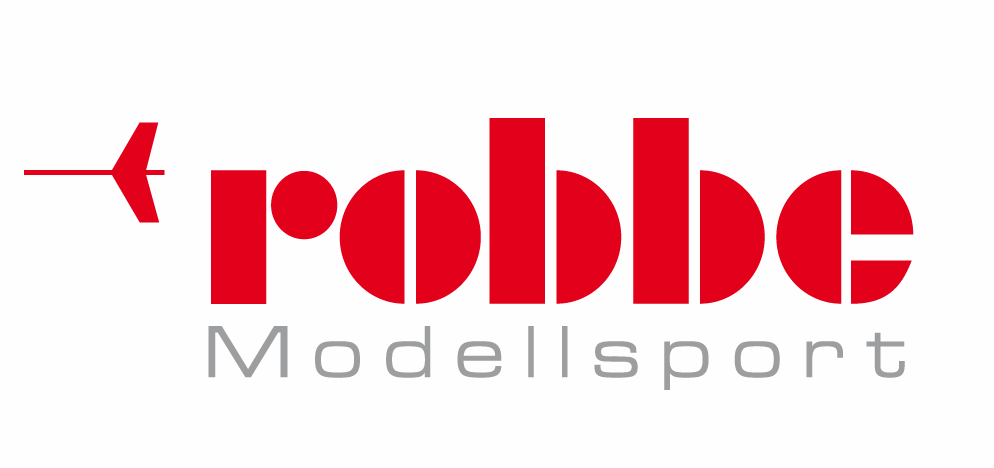
- Formerly: Robbe Schluter
- Industry: model kit manufacture
- Founded: 1924; 102 years ago
- Founder: Robert Becker
- Defunct: 2015
- Fate: Bankrupt
- Successor: AvioTiger Germany GmbH
- Headquarters: Grebenhain, Germany, Germany
- Parent: Schwartzhaupt Group (1981-2015)

Robbe Modellsport or Robbe Schluter was a company from Grebenhain, Germany, specialising in radio control model aircraft, boats and cars in kit form.

The company was founded in 1924 by Robert Becker as a timber company, with its name derived from the founder's name Robert Becker. By 1945 Robert Becker's son Hubert started to produce modelling kits as well. In 1981 the company was taken over by the Schwarzhaupt group of Cologne, who marketed Robbe products throughout Europe. Robbe was declared bankrupt in 2015. Four former employees founded AvioTiger Germany GmbH, which bought the Robbe brand name and some product lines from the insolvency administrator.

ROMARIN The ship model division from Robbe Modellsport has passed into the possession of Krick Modelltechnik in the summer of 2015. The former Robbe products are marketed under the brand "romarin by krick".
