= Manuel Marburger =

German industrial climber (born 1973)

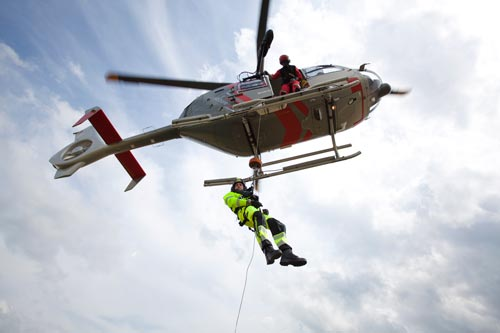
- Born: May 7, 1973 (age 52); Bad Soden-Salmünster, Hesse, Germany
- Occupation(s): Entrepreneur, Author, Founder, Keynote Speaker
- Website: www.manuelmarburger.de

Manuel Marburger (born May 7, 1973 in Bad Soden-Salmünster) is a German industrial climber.

== Career ==
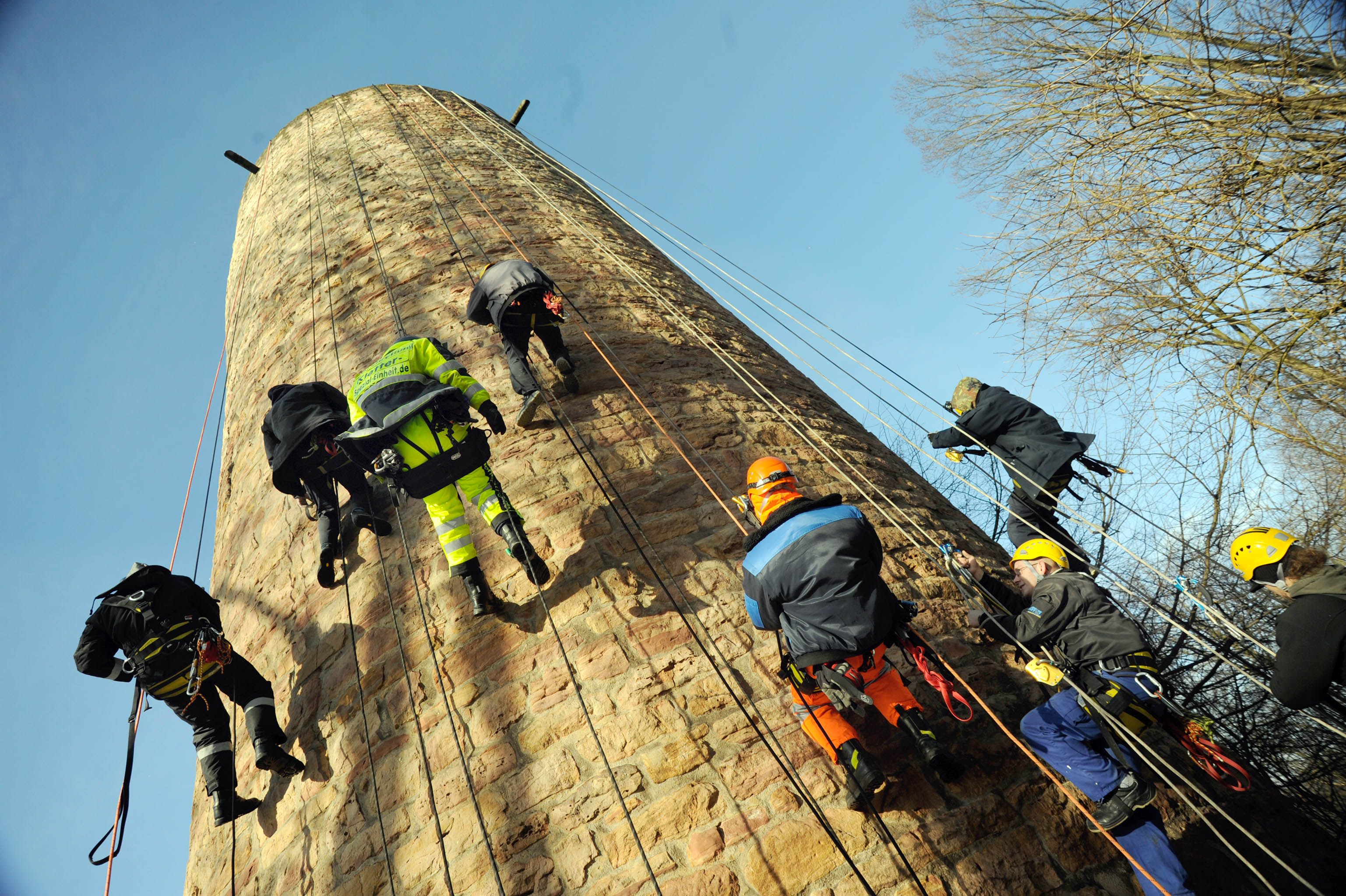
Training of the Kletter-Spezial-Einheit (2009)

Marburger worked as an engine driver for Deutsche Bahn AG and as a paramedic. He began his training as an industrial climber at the Fach- und Interessenverband für Seilunterstützte Arbeitstechniken (FISAT) and founded his first company, Kletter-Spezial-Einheit GmbH & Co. KG. For this company he was awarded the Hessian Founders Prize 2006.

Marburger's history stretches from different schools to different jobs. In 2002, Marburger founded a vocational climbing school in Bad Soden-Salmünster, the first school in Germany for the training and further education of rope technicians and rope workers. Some time later he founded Blacksafe GmbH, a company specialising in products for professional industrial climbers. For this purpose he opened an online shop, the Kletter-Spezial-Laden. Marburger sold Kletter-Spezial-Einheit GmbH & Co. KG in 2013, and Blacksafe GmbH in 2019.

His current company, Muve GmbH, is dedicated to management consulting, team training, coaching and interim management. Marburger also works as a keynote speaker.

== Recognition ==
- 2006: Hessian Founders Award for the Most Intelligent Business Idea
- 2012: Industry Outdoor Award for the most innovative product development
- 2019: Red Fox Award: Germany's Best Business Speaker

== Publications ==
- Marburger, Manuel. Aufschlagen und Einschlagen, Muve Verlag, May 1, 2017 ISBN 978-3-00-059034-4
- Marburger, Manuel (editor). Erfolg geht anders: Top Speaker verraten, was wirklich zählt, Kindle Edition, e-book, March 13, 2019.
