= Birstein =

- Municipality
- Coat of arms

- Location of Birstein within Main-Kinzig-Kreis district
- Interactive map of Birstein
- Location within Germany Location within Hesse
- Coordinates: 50°21′11″N 9°18′33″E
- Country: Germany
- State: Hesse
- Admin. region: Darmstadt
- District: Main-Kinzig-Kreis
- Subdivisions: 16 Ortsteile

Government
  - Mayor (2019–25): Fabian Fehl (SPD)

Area
  - Total: 86.63 km^{2} (33.45 sq mi)
- Elevation: 268–570 m (879–1,870 ft)

Population (2025-12-31)
  - Total: 6,115
  - Density: 70.59/km^{2} (182.8/sq mi)
- Time zone: UTC+01:00 (CET)
  - Summer (DST): UTC+02:00 (CEST)
- Postal codes: 63633
- Dialling codes: 06054
- Vehicle registration: MKK
- Website: www.birstein.de

Birstein is a municipality on the northeastern edge of the Main-Kinzig-Kreis in Hesse, Germany with 6,094 inhabitants. It was the home of the former principality of Isenburg-Birstein.

== Geography ==
=== Location ===
The town lies at the southern base of the Vogelsberg Mountains. For this reason, and because of the natural beauty of its setting, it is known as the "Pearl of the Vogelsberg".

Birstein proper has two sections. The northern part, uphill from the palace, is known as the "Oberberg", while the southern part, where most of the shops and commercial establishments are located, is called the "Unterberg".

=== Neighboring municipalities ===
To the north, Birstein borders on Grebenhain, which lies in the Vogelsbergkreis. On this border is the Völzberger Köpfchen, the highest peak of the area. To the east, its neighbors are Freiensteinau (also in the Vogelsbergkreis) and the town of Steinau an der Straße. Bad Soden-Salmünster and the municipality of Brachttal border it on the south, as do Kefenrod and the town of Gedern on the west, both in the Wetteraukreis.

=== Subdivisions ===
The municipality consists of the subdivisions of Birstein, Bösgesäß I, Bösgesäß II, Fischborn, Hettersroth, Illnhausen, Kirchbracht. Lichenroth, Mauswinkel, Oberreichenbach, Birstein, Obersotzbach, Unterreichenbach, Untersotzbach, Völzberg, Wettges, and Wüstwillenroth.

The separation of Bösgesäß I (Prussian Bösgesäß) and Bösgesäß II (Hessian Bösgesäß) took place as a result of the Congress of Vienna. The brook which flows through this area, called the Bracht, was designated as the border between the two localities. They lie approximately 100 meters apart.

== History ==
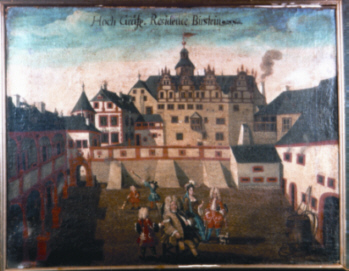
Birstein Castle (1720)

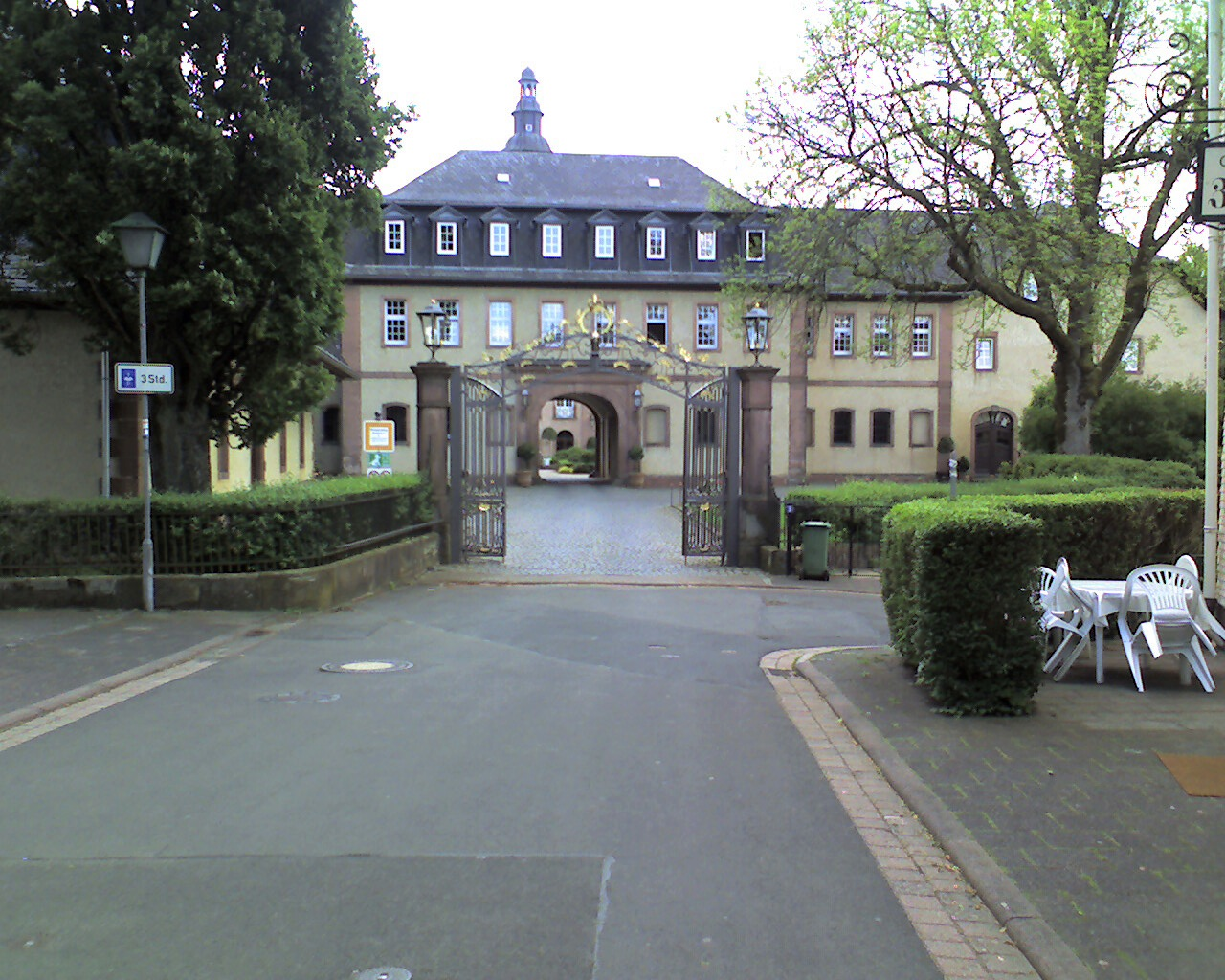
The entrance into Birstein Castle (de), where the Birstein branch of the House of Isenburg continues to live.

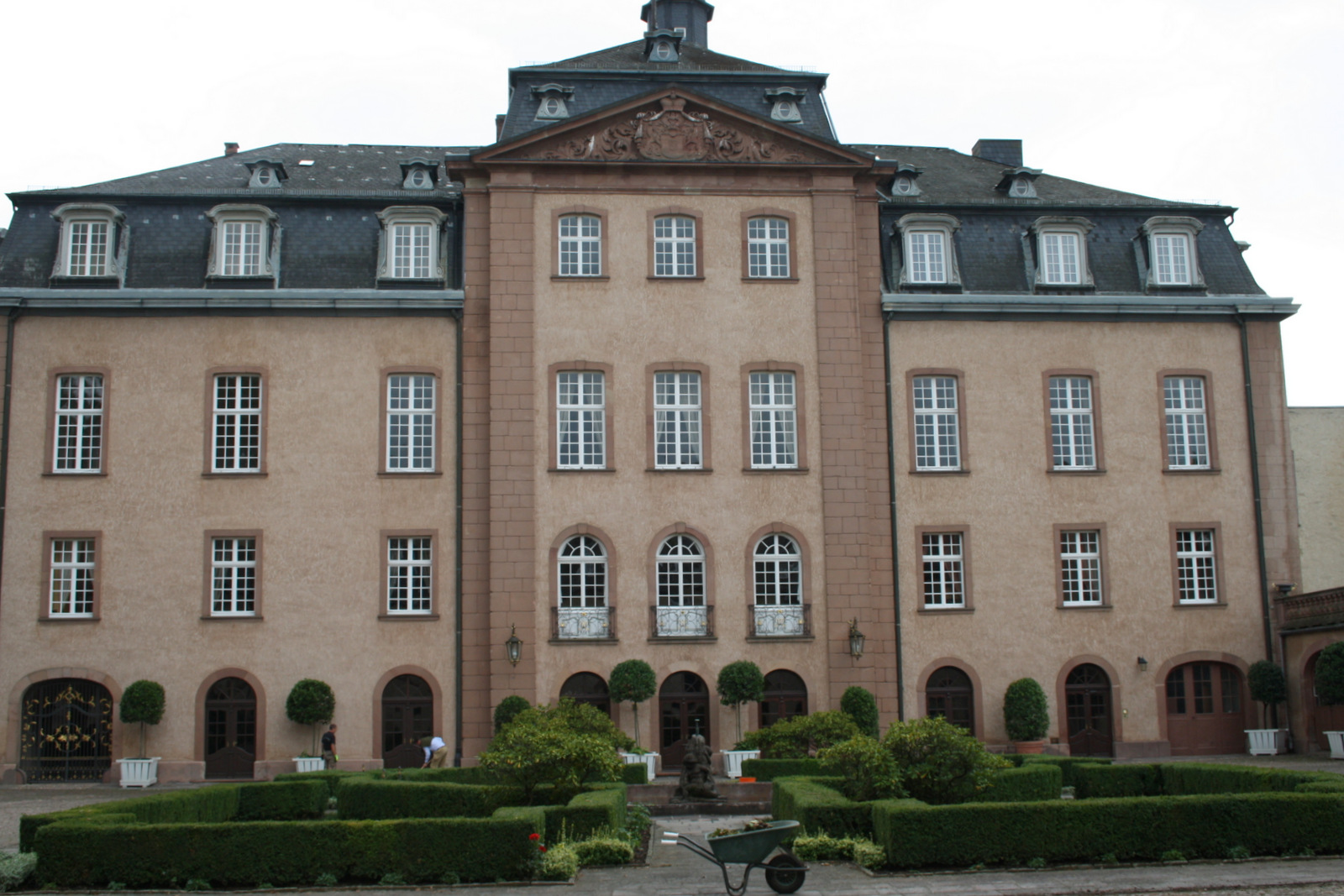
Birstein Castle, park front

The palace at Birstein, originally a fortified royal hunting lodge, was first cited in documents in 1279 as castrum birsenstein and gave its name to the surrounding town. The name comes from the archaic verb "birsen" (= "birschen"), which means to hunt with tracking dogs. The palace was remodeled several times and took its present form in 1764-1768. It is still inhabited by members of the Isenburg-Birstein dynasty, whose ancestor Heinrich II von Isenburg obtained it as part of his marriage settlement with Adelheid von Hanau in 1332.

In 1815, the principality was divided between Hesse-Darmstadt and Hesse-Kassel, and Birstein fell to Kassel. With the Prussian victory against Austria in 1866, Birstein became part of the Prussian empire until German unification in 1875.

Birstein, like other German regions, was greatly affected by the Thirty Years War, most markedly in 1634-36. It was occupied by Swedish soldiers in 1643. On September 7, 1763, the French army under Jean-Baptiste Jourdan, which had been defeated at Würzburg four days before, marched through the town on their retreat.

Other events also left their mark. On July 21, 1684, fire destroyed 17 homes, 18 barns, 9 cattle stalls, and a bakehouse in the Oberberg, but spared the nearby church and rectory. Another fire in the Oberberg on July 14, 1744 destroyed 23 homes. On June 27, 1767, a terrible hailstorm gave rise to a yearly day of prayer against severe weather.

In 1590 a Latin school was founded in Birstein. It remained in various forms and locations for over three hundred years. By the early 20th century, girls were also admitted. The school closed in 1939.

Birstein escaped damage in World War II, although many of its young men were killed as soldiers. It was occupied by the Americans after the war, and eventually became part of the Main-Kinzig-Kreis in the state of Hesse in the new Federal Republic of Germany. It was declared an official fresh-air spa resort in 1963, increasing its attractiveness for tourists. The unification of its various district subdivisions (see above) took place from 1971–74, bringing the municipality to its present form.

== Religion ==
A high percentage of the population of greater Birstein is Protestant (evangelical Lutheran). In addition to the five Protestant churches, there is currently one Roman Catholic church and other religious communities.

Originally Roman Catholic, Birstein began to move toward Protestantism in 1530, when the minister Johannes Henkel began to preach in favor of Martin Luther in Unterreichenbach. In 1544, Count Reinhard of Isenburg, the ruler of the region, converted to Protestantism. On August 7, 1597 Count Wolfgang Ernst I of Isenburg announced the conversion of the region itself. The 200-year-old Protestant church in Birstein burned to its foundations on January 7, 1913; the current church was built on the same site and consecrated on April 19, 1914.

In 1840, a small Catholic house of worship was built. A larger Catholic church, Mariä Heimsuchung (Church of the Visitation) was built in 1912-14. The current Count of Isenburg, Alexander, is also Catholic. This came about as follows: Alexander's ancestor Karl Viktor of Isenburg was raised a Protestant in the family tradition after his father's early death, but converted to Catholicism, the religion of his mother Princess Maria Crescentia zu Löwenstein-Wertheim-Rosenberg, on May 2, 1861. Four years later, he married the Catholic princess Marie Luise of Austria, Princess of Tuscany, and since then all the ducal family have remained members of this faith. The church has been the site of many Isenburg weddings, most recently that of Princess Katharina of Isenburg to Archduke Martin of Austria-Este in 2004.

A Jewish community existed in Birstein from the 17th century on, with the first mention of a Jewish inhabitant in 1549. A Jewish cemetery was founded in 1679, while a synagogue built in 1749 was rebuilt and expanded in 1866. A Jewish school was built in 1849 and operated until 1936.

In 1925, Jews composed 10.4% of Birstein's population. A majority of these were forced to emigrate in the first years of the National Socialist regime, and the Jewish community was officially dissolved in 1937. Although Birstein did not take part in the violence of Kristallnacht, the cemetery was vandalized. At least 26 Jews who were born and/or lived in Birstein died in concentration camps.

== Governance ==
=== Representation ===
The election of 27 March 2011 resulted in the following:

Parties and voter coalitions		% 2011	Seats; 2011	% 2006	Seats; 2006
SPD	Social Democratic Party of Germany	33.5	9	36.9	9
CDU	Christian Democratic Union	28.7	7	34.3	9
FBG	Free Voters	27.5	7	28.8	7
ABB	Active citizens for Birstein	5.5	1	–	–
FDP	Free Democratic Party	4.8	1	–	–
total		100.0	25	100.0	25
Voter turnout in %		55.5		49.6	

== Cultural and tourist attractions ==
- The palace of the counts of Isenburg-Birstein in Birstein
- The "Cathedral of the Vogelsberg" in Unterreichenbach

== Notable people ==
- Anton Praetorius (1560–1613). Calvinist theologian who held the position of court preacher at the castle in Birstein from 1596-1598. As a witness in a celebrated witchcraft trial there, he made a historic protest against torture which, unusually, resulted in the release of the accused.
- Carl Lomb, who after his emigration to the U.S. made a fortune in optical instruments as part of the firm of Bausch & Lomb, founded by his cousin Henry Lomb. He donated two stained glass windows, "The Crucifixion" and "The Resurrection" to the Protestant church in Birstein, and was made an honorary citizen. This document is displayed in the foyer of the town hall. A street in Birstein, "Carl-Lomb-Strasse" is also named for him.
- Sophie, Princess of Isenburg, wife of Georg Friedrich, Prince of Prussia.
