= Hosenfeld =

- Municipality
- Coat of arms

- Location of Hosenfeld within Fulda district
- Interactive map of Hosenfeld
- Location within Germany Location within Hesse
- Coordinates: 50°31′N 09°29′E
- Country: Germany
- State: Hesse
- Admin. region: Kassel
- District: Fulda

Government
  - Mayor (2019–25): Peter Malolepszy

Area
  - Total: 50.71 km^{2} (19.58 sq mi)
- Elevation: 270–496 m (886–1,627 ft)

Population (2025-12-31)
  - Total: 4,554
  - Density: 89.80/km^{2} (232.6/sq mi)
- Time zone: UTC+01:00 (CET)
  - Summer (DST): UTC+02:00 (CEST)
- Postal codes: 36154
- Dialling codes: 06650
- Vehicle registration: FD
- Website: www.gemeinde-hosenfeld.de

Hosenfeld is a municipality in the district of Fulda, in Hesse, Germany.
