= Kefenrod =

- Municipality
- Coat of arms

- Location of Kefenrod within Wetteraukreis district
- Interactive map of Kefenrod
- Location within Germany Location within Hesse
- Coordinates: 50°20′38″N 9°12′38″E
- Country: Germany
- State: Hesse
- Admin. region: Darmstadt
- District: Wetteraukreis
- Subdivisions: 5 districts

Government
  - Mayor (2025–31): Markus Gerlach

Area
  - Total: 30.67 km^{2} (11.84 sq mi)
- Elevation: 263 m (863 ft)

Population (2025-12-31)
  - Total: 2,557
  - Density: 83.37/km^{2} (215.9/sq mi)
- Time zone: UTC+01:00 (CET)
  - Summer (DST): UTC+02:00 (CEST)
- Postal codes: 63699
- Dialling codes: 06049, 06054
- Vehicle registration: FB, BÜD

Kefenrod (German pronunciation: [ˈkeːfn̩ˌʁoːt]) is a municipality in the Wetteraukreis, in Hesse, Germany. It is located approximately 46 kilometers northeast of Frankfurt am Main.
