= William I of Isenburg-Braunsberg =

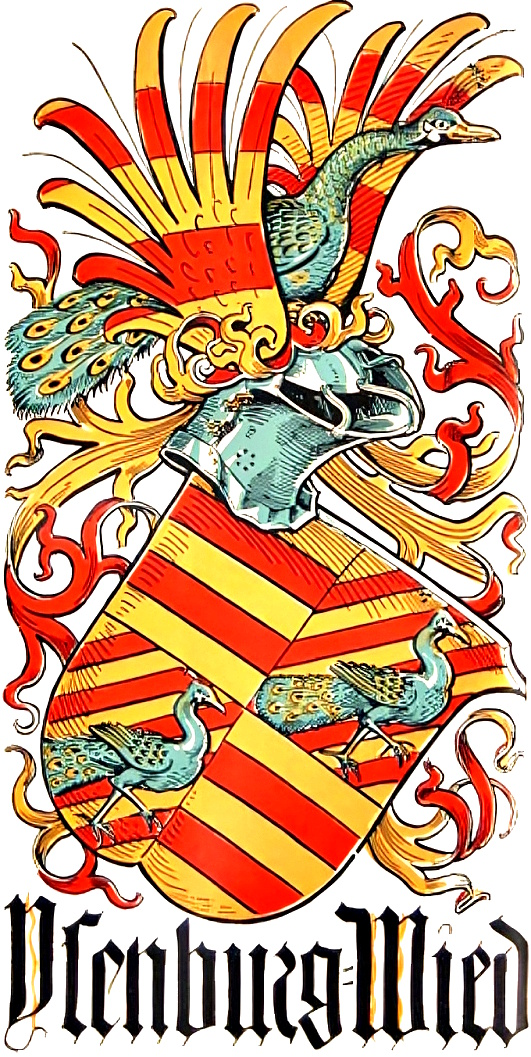
Drawing of the coat of arms of the Counts and Lords of Isenburg-Braunsberg-Wied (Ysenburg-Wied) by Otto Hupp for the Munich Calendar 1904

William I of Isenburg-Braunsberg (German: Wilhelm I. von Isenburg-Braunsberg) was the Count of Isenburg-Braunsberg from 1327 until 1383. In 1338 William was raised to an Imperial Count.

== Life ==
Wilhelm was the only son of Bruno IV of Braunsberg († 1325) and Heilwig von Katzenelnbogen (* around 1290; † 1333), daughter of Wilhelm I of Katzenelnbogen. After Wilhelm's grandfather John I von Braunsberg died, King Ludwig IV (* 1282; † October 11, 1347) entrusted him with the Palatinate fiefs, especially the lordship of Wied, in 1227. In addition, in 1228 he was able to receive the Trier fiefs of the parishes of Dierdorf, Puderbach and Niederbieber, Dierdorf Castle, the courts of Rückeroth and Maischeid and Roth and the Wildbann in the Spurkenwald. He first had to secure his grandfather's Braunsberg inheritance through a feud with Johann's sons-in-law Rorich of Renneberg and Burgrave Ludwig of Hammerstein from 1329 to 1331. On December 21, 1331, Wilhelm forced the Walpode Ludwig of Neuerburg to give his newly built Reichenstein Castle in the parish of Puderbach to him as a fief. In response to Reichenstein Castle, he also built the Grebeneck Castle, mentioned in 1366, but it was forgotten after a comparison with Heinrich of Reichenstein, which means that its location cannot be found to this day. The remains of a wall found on the Köppel near Seifen in the municipality of Döttesfeld could be the remains of Grebeneck Castle.

=== Union of the County of Wied ===
Thanks to Wilhelm's skillful marriage policy, he was able to gradually reunite the old County of Wied between 1329 and 1340. His first wife Agnes of Virneburg († December 26, 1352), daughter of Count Ruprecht III of Virneburg, brought him the Eppstein part of the County of Wied as a dowry. It was not until June 28, 1340 that he called himself Count of Wied, Lord of Isenburg and Braunsberg, and was thus able to merge the old Wied possessions with the Isenburg-Braunsberg possessions. This expanded territory of the County of Wied-Isenburg, which he represented with 88 vassals, remained essentially almost unchanged until 1806. He promoted Knight Gerlach of Heddesdorf to his court marshal at Braunsberg and married him to his daughter Heilwig (* before 1367; † after January 28, 1389) in 1371, which significantly improved the relationship between the nobles of Heddesdorf and the Isenburgers. Gerlach's ancestors had long served the Wied counts as knights, for example they were in the retinue of the crusaders with Count Georg of Wied in 1217.

On February 7, 1357, Wilhelm received town and market rights for Engers, Nordhofen and Almersbach from Emperor Charles IV in Maastricht. From 1357 to 1371, he built the first tower of the city fortifications of Engers, today called Grauer Turm. At the time of its construction, it was called the Graven (Count's) Tower. Count Wilhelm I of Wied wanted to collect Rhine tolls from here. In 1351, through his marriage to Johanna von Jülich, Wilhelm received as a dowry further rights to the County of Wied, the Office of Sinzig and the Lordship of Vernich.

=== William loses Engers ===
Although William was a feudal lord of Trier and was the court lord and mayor of Koblenz under Archbishop Baldwin of Trier and had promised Baldwin lifelong support in 1331, he fought against him in the Grenzau Feud. Constantly in financial need, he sometimes mortgaged entire villages from his property and received a warning from the emperor for coinage offences. In 1344, William even had to mortgage Dierdorf, Rückeroth and the Rohrburg near Dreifelden to Baldwin of Trier. In 1355, however, he was able to redeem these properties. The most consequential derailment, however, was the loss of Engers.

In 1371, despite his Cologne feudal status, William and Salentin of Nieder-Isenburg attacked Cologne merchant ships on the rhine. Archbishop Kuno von Falkenstein then occupied Engers and the Isenburg lordship, attacked the town of Dierdorf and forced William I, who had fled to Andernach, to hand over the town of Engers to the Electorate of Trier as punishment. Archbishop Kuno then fortified Engers with walls and towers and built Kunostein Castle directly on the banks of the Rhine to protect the surrounding Trier areas and Rhine shipping.

== Family ==
Wilhelm's first marriage was with Agnes von Virneburg. This marriage remained childless and he divorced after 22 years on September 12, 1351. In the same year he married Johanna von Jülich (* around 1335; † February 21, 1367), daughter of Count Wilhelm I of Jülich. They had the following children:

- William II (* around 1352; † 1404), 1352 provost of St. Maria in Aachen, 1383–1404 count of half of the county of Wied, lord of Isenburg
- Heilwig (* before 1367; † after January 28, 1389), ⚭ 1371 Gerlach of Heddesdorf, knight, court marshal of Wilhelm I of Wied
- Isaldis, nun in Gandersheim
- Agnes, († after 1362), ⚭ 1362 Philipp VI (* around 1320; † between March 24, 1370 and August 6, 1373), lord of Königstein/Falkenstein

After Johanna's death, he married Lysa (Elisabeth) of Arenfels († 1403), daughter of Gerlach III (* 1319; † around 1371), Lord of Isenburg-Arenfels from 1348 to 1371, in 1367. The couple had the following children:

- Gerlach (* around 1365; † after 1411), 1383–1404 Count of half of the County of Wied, 1404–1411 Count of Wied, Lord of Isenburg, ⚭ 1376 Agnes (* around 1360/65; † after 9 July 1402), daughter of John I († 1395), Lord of Isenburg-Büdingen
- Wilhelm (* around 1370; † after 1408), caronicus in St. Gereon in Cologne, 1392 choir bishop and archdeacon in Trier
- Elisabeth († 22 May 1426), ⚭ I) 1369 Reinhard III. († 1449), Lord of Westerburg, ⚭ II) before 18 October 1399 Gerhard, Count of Blankenheim, Lord of Kastelberg and Gerhardstein

Preceded by:	William I	Succeeded by:
John I	Count of Isenburg-Braunsberg; 1327–1383	William II
