= List of states in the Holy Roman Empire (I) =

This is a list of states in the Holy Roman Empire beginning with the letter I. Some historians mark the beginning of the Empire as 800, with the coronation of Frankish king Charlemagne ("Charles the Great").

Name	Type	Imperial circle	Imperial diet	History
Inner Austria	Duchy			1379: Partitioned from Austria; 1406: Annexed to Austria
Irsee	Abbacy	Swab	SP	1186: Formed; 1695: Imperial immediacy 1802: To Bavaria
Isenberg-Limburg	County	n/a	n/a	1253: Renamed from Altena-Isenberg; 1289: Acquired Altenhof and Styrum; 1304: Partitioned into Limburg-Hohenlimburg and Limburg-Styrum
Isenburg; HRE Prince of Isenburg	Lordship	n/a	n/a	11th Century: Counts of the Niederlahngau assumed the name Isenburg though without comital rank 1129: Acquired Kobern; 1137: Partitioned into Isenburg-Kobern and Isenburg-Isenburg; 1197: Rembold IV acquired Kempenich, founding Isenburg-Kempenich c1100: Division into Isenburg-Limburg and Isenburg-Kempenich; 1137: Partitioned into Isenburg-Isenburg and Isenburg-Limburg-Covern; 1673: Division into Isenburg, Birstein, Isenburg-Marienborn, Isenburg-Meerholz, Isenburg-Wachtersbach; 1806: Joined Confederation of the Rhine
Isenburg-Arenfels	Lordship	n/a	n/a	c. 1280: Partitioned from Isenburg-Cleeberg; 1371: Extinct; to Isenburg-Isenburg
Isenburg-Birstein	County; 1744: Principality	Upp Rhen	WT	1511: Partitioned from Isenburg-Büdingen; 1628: Partitioned into Isenburg-Offenbach and Isenburg-Büdingen; 1685: Partitioned from Isenburg-Offenbach; 1744: HRE Prince; 1803: Bench of Princes; 1806: Renamed to Principality of Isenburg and mediatised the other branches of the House of Isenburg; 1815: To the Grand Duchy of Hesse; renamed to Ysenburg and Büdingen
Isenburg-Braunsberg	Lordship	n/a	n/a	c. 1175: Partitioned from Isenburg-Isenburg; 1243: Renamed to Isenburg-Wied after inheriting Wied
Isenburg-Büdingen	Lordship; 1442: County	n/a	n/a	1341: Partitioned from Isenburg-Cleeberg; 1442: HRE Count; 1511: Partitioned into Isenburg-Rönneburg and Isenburg-Birstein; 1628: Partitioned from Isenburg-Birstein; 1673: Partitioned into itself, Isenburg-Wächtersbach, Isenburg-Meerholz and Isenburg-Marienborn; 1806: To Isenburg-Birstein; 1815: To the Grand Duchy of Hesse
Isenburg-Cleeberg (Isenburg-Cleberg)	Lordship	n/a	n/a	c. 1158: Partitioned from Isenburg-Kobern; 1221: Acquired Limburg an der Lahn; 1258: Partitioned into itself and Isenburg-Limburg c. 1280: Partitioned into Isenburg-Arenfels and itself 1304: Acquired Büdingen; 1310: Acquired Grenzau; 1341: Partitioned into Isenburg-Büdingen and Isenburg-Grenzau
Isenburg-Eisenberg	County	n/a	n/a	1685: Partitioned from Isenburg-Offenbach; 1758: Extinct; to Isenburg-Birstein
Isenburg-Grenzau	Lordship	n/a	n/a	1341: Partitioned from Isenburg-Cleeberg; 1439: Extinct; to Nassau-Beilstein; 1446: To the Archbishopric of Trier; 1460: To Isenburg-Isenburg (Lower Isenburg)
Isenburg-Grenzau	Lordship	n/a	n/a	1502: Partitioned from Isenburg-Isenburg (Lower Isenburg); 1664: Extinct; divided between the Archbishoprics of Cologne and Trier and Fulda Abbey, with the latter granting their share of the territory to Walderdorff
Isenburg-Isenburg (Lower Isenburg)	Lordship	n/a	n/a	1137: Partitioned from Isenburg c. 1175: Partitioned into itself and Isenburg-Braunsberg; 1197: Acquired Kempenich c. 1220: Partitioned into itself and Isenburg-Kempenich; 1460: Acquired Grenzau; 1497: Acquired Neumagen; 1502: Partitioned into Isenburg-Grenzau and Isenburg-Neumagen
Isenburg-Kempenich	Lordship	n/a	n/a	1277: Made fief of the Archbishopric of Trier; 1424: Extinct; to Schöneck
Isenburg-Kobern (Isenburg-Covern)	Lordship	n/a	n/a	1137: Partitioned from Isenburg c. 1158: Partitioned into itself and Isenburg-Cleeberg; 1195: Made fief of the Archbishopric of Trier; 1266: Extinct; to Neuerburg
Isenburg-Limburg	Lordship	n/a	n/a	1258: Partitioned from Isenburg-Cleeberg; 1406: Extinct; to the Archbishopric of Trier
Isenburg-Marienborn	Lordship; 1442: County	Upp Rhen	n/a	1673: Partitioned from Isenburg-Büdingen; 1725: Extinct; divided between Isenburg-Büdingen, Isenburg-Wächtersbach and Isenburg-Meerholz
Isenburg-Meerholz	Lordship; 1442: County	Upp Rhen	n/a	1673: Partitioned from Isenburg-Büdingen; 1806: To Isenburg-Birstein; 1815: To the Grand Duchy of Hesse
Isenburg-Neumagen	Lordship	n/a	n/a	1502: Partitioned from Isenburg-Isenburg (Lower Isenburg); 1554: Extinct; to Sayn-Wittgenstein
Isenburg-Offenbach	County	Upp Rhen	n/a	1628: Partitioned from Isenburg-Birstein; 1685: Partitioned into Isenburg-Philippseich, Isenburg-Birstein and Isenburg-Eisenberg
Isenburg-Philippseich	County	Upp Rhen	n/a	1685: Partitioned from Isenburg-Offenbach; 1718: Extinct; given as an appanage to his nephew William Maurice II, Count of Isenburg-Philippseich without imperial immediacy nor representation in the imperial diet
Isenburg-Rönneburg	County	Upp Rhen	n/a	1511: Partitioned from Isenburg-Büdingen; 1601: Extinct; to Isenburg-Birstein
Isenburg-Wächtersbach	Lordship; 1442: County	Upp Rhen	n/a	1673: Partitioned from Isenburg-Büdingen; 1806: To Isenburg-Birstein; 1815: To the Grand Duchy of Hesse
Isenburg-Wied	County	n/a	n/a	1243: Renamed from Isenburg-Braunsberg after inheriting Wied; 1462: Extinct; to Runkel
Isny im Allgäu	Imperial City	Swab	SW	1365: Free Imperial City; 1803: To Quadt; 1806: To Württemberg
Istria	Margraviate	n/a	n/a	1040: Given to Poppo of Weimar-Orlamünde, also of Carniola; 1173: To Andechs-Meran; 1209: To the Patriarchate of Aquileia; 13th Century: Most to Venice; 1374: To Austria as mediate province through Carniola; 1420: Rest of Istria to Venice; 1797: Venetian parts to Austria; 1805: To Italy; 1815: To Austria
Itter	Lordship			
