= Caroline of Nassau =

Caroline of Nassau may refer to:

- Princess Caroline of Nassau-Usingen (1762–1823)
- Princess Caroline of Nassau-Weilburg (1770–1828)
- Countess Caroline of Nassau-Saarbrücken (1704–1774)
- Countess Caroline Felizitas of Leiningen-Dagsburg (1734–1810), of the House of Nassau by marriage

== See also ==
- Carolina of Nassau-Weilburg
