= Bruno II =

Bruno II or Brun II may refer to:

- Bruno II (bishop of Verden) (r. 1034–1049)
- Bruno II of Brunswick (died 1057), count
- Bruno II von Berg, archbishop of Cologne from 1131 until 1137
- Bruno von Porstendorf, bishop of Meissen as Bruno II from 1209 until 1228
- Bruno II of Isenburg-Braunsberg (r. 1210–1255)
