= Karl Ludwig, Prince of Wied-Runkel =

Karl Ludwig of Wied-Runkel
- Smaller coat of arms of the Princes of Wied-Runkel, Lords of Runkel and Isenburg
- Born: 29 September 1763; Dierdorf
- Died: 9 March 1824 (aged 60)
- Spouse: Princess Caroline of Nassau-Weilburg (m. 1787)
- House: Wied
- Father: Christian Ludwig, Prince of Wied-Runkel
- Mother: Charlotte Sophia Augusta of Sayn-Wittgenstein

Karl Ludwig Friedrich Alexander, Prince of Wied-Runkel (29 September 1763 – 9 March 1824) was a German ruler in the Principality of Wied-Runkel from 1791 until 1806 when it was mediatised to the Duchy of Nassau.

== Life ==
=== Origin and family ===
Karl Ludwig of Wied-Runkel was born as the son of the later Christian Ludwig, Prince of Wied-Runkel (1732–1791) and his wife Charlotte Sophia Augusta von Sayn-Wittgenstein (1741–1803) and grew up with his brothers Friedrich Ludwig (1770–1824) and Christian Friedrich Ludwig (* 1773, ensign in the Upper Rhine District Regiment of Zweibrücken). Five brothers died in early childhood. On September 4, 1787, he married Princess Caroline of Nassau-Weilburg (1770–1828), daughter of Karl Christian, Prince of Nassau-Weilburg and Princess Carolina of Orange-Nassau.

=== Work ===
After his father's death in 1791, he succeeded him. French Revolution troops gradually occupied the areas of the County of Kriechingen between 1793 and 1797. This brought an end to the prince's rule. With the Peace of Lunéville in 1801, the German areas on the left bank of the Rhine were incorporated into the French Republic.

In 1803, he was compensated for his losses and received Altenwied and Neuerburg, a valuable addition to the Westerwald ancestral lands. In 1806, the right-hand part of the Runkel domain went to the Grand Duchy of Berg, which Napoleon had established as a satellite state of the French Empire.

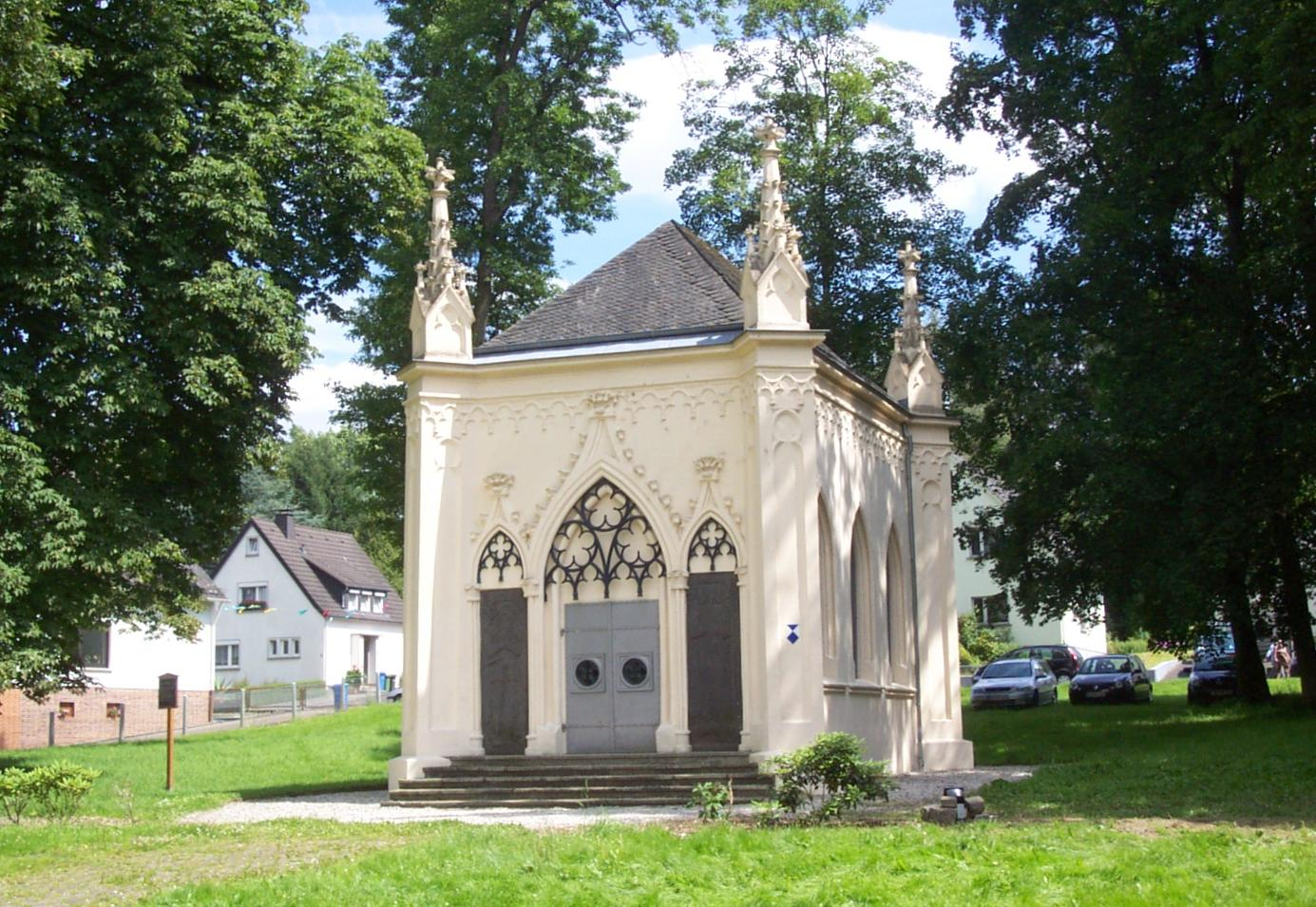
Dierdorf Mausoleum, built in 1816 by Karl Ludwig zu Wied-Runkel

He resided in the Dierdorf Castle. In 1802 it was still said of his widowed mother, Princess Charlotte, née von Sayn-Wittgenstein-Sayn (14 July 1741 – 5 June 1803): "lives in Dierdorf with her son". In 1816 he had a mausoleum built in Dierdorf in the neo-Gothic style. During his term of office, ordinances and regulations were issued that were necessary to maintain order and security. In literature he is referred to as a "scientific dilettante".

In 1806 Wied-Runkel was mediatised to the Duchy of Nassau and the Grand Duchy of Berg and Karl Ludwig was demoted to the rank of State Lord, with the titles of Prince of Wied and Lord of Runkel.

He died childless on March 9, 1824. His brother Friedrich Ludwig succeeded him in office. When he died just over a month later on April 28, the Wied-Runkel line died out.

=== Title ===
The larger title, when his father was still ruling count, was Carl Ludwig Friederich Alexander, hereditary count of Wied, Isenburg and Criechingen, lord of Runkel, Saarwellingen, Püttlingen, Rollingen, Helflingen and the upper bailiff of Remilly etc., hereditary marshal of the Duchy of Luxembourg and the County of Chiny, then, when he himself ruled, ruling prince of Wied-Runkel, lord of Runkel and Isenburg etc. or finally Carl Ludwig Friedrich Alexander, Prince of Wied, Count of Isenburg, Lord of Runkel and Neuerburg, Hereditary Marshal of the Duchy of Luxembourg and the County of Chiny, Grand Cross of the Polish White Eagle and the Royal Belgian Order of the Lion and the Order of St. John, Honorary Commander.
