= Dierdorf Castle =

Former palace of the princes of Wied-Runkel in Dierdorf, Germany

Coordinates: 50.549794°N 7.655108°E

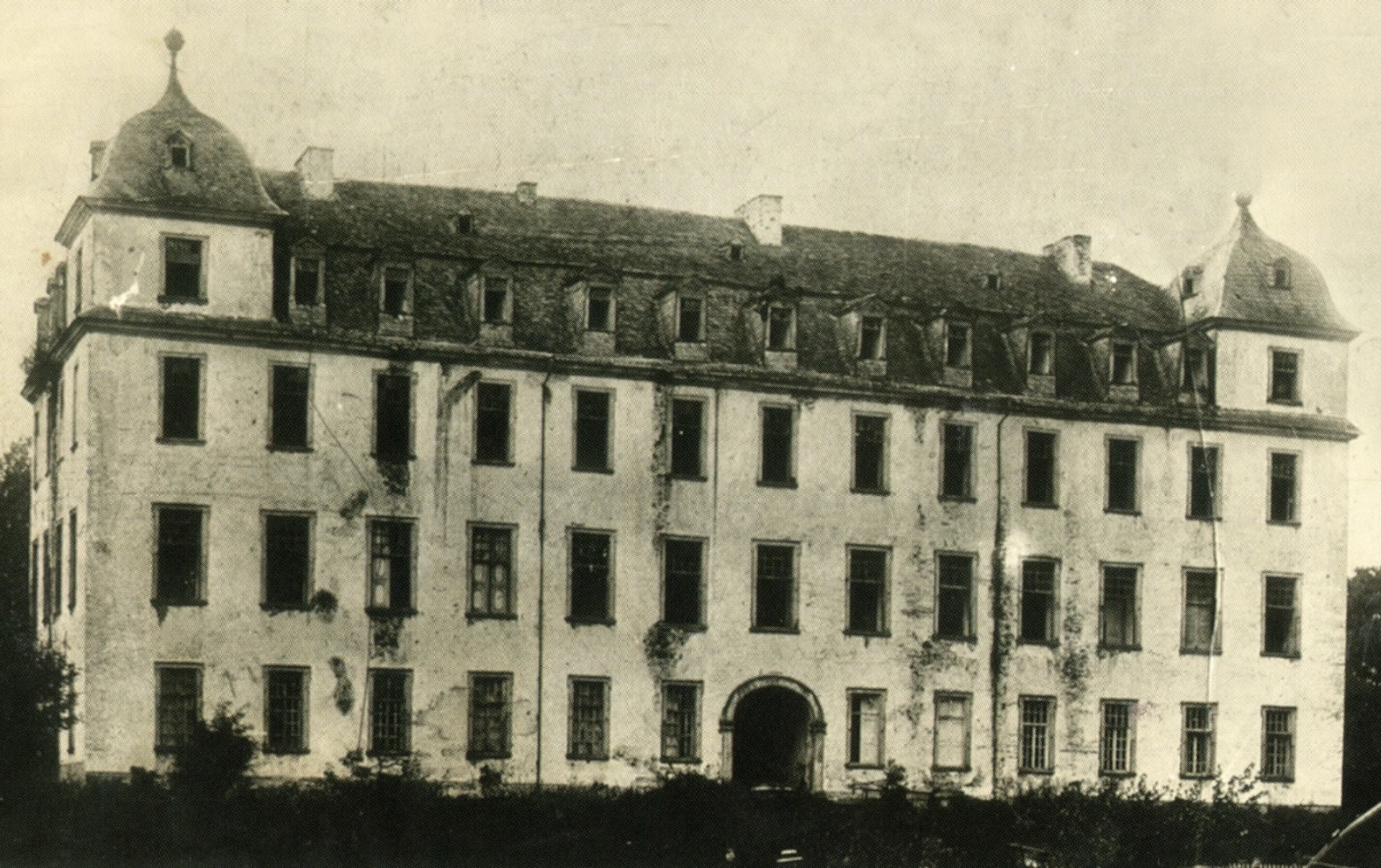
Schloss Dierdorf before its demolition

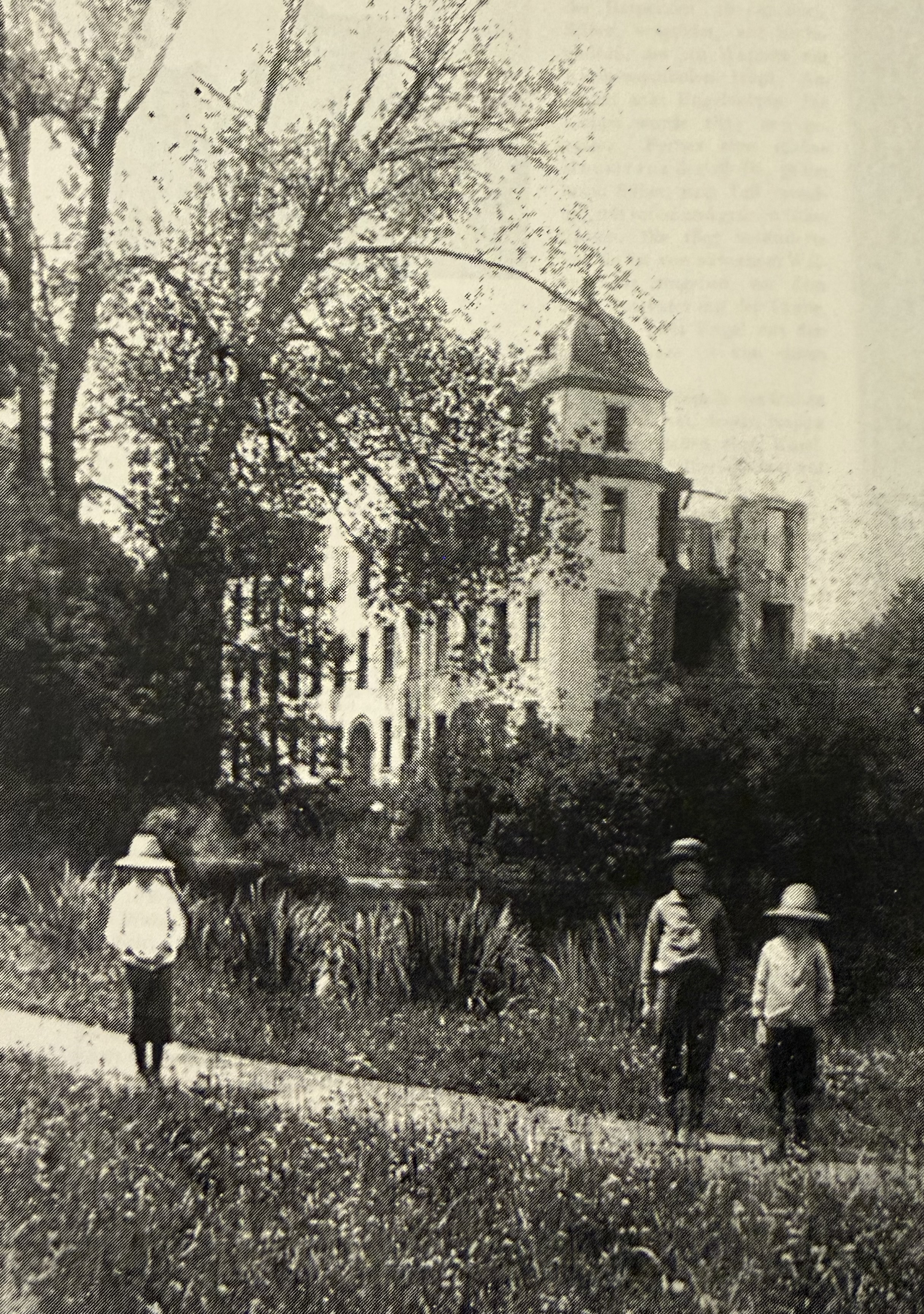
Schloss Dierdorf before demolition in 1902

Dierdorf castle (German: Schloss Dierdorf) was a former moated castle and later baroque style princely residence located in Dierdorf, in the Westerwald region of present-day Rhineland-Palatinate, Germany. From the early 18th century until the 19th century, it served as a residence of the Princes of Wied-Runkel. The palace building itself was demolished in 1902; however, the castle pond (German: Schlossweiher), parts of the former park landscape, and the mausoleum of the Princes of Wied-Runkel have survived.

== Location and topography ==
The castle complex was situated on an artificial island within a pond, known as the Schlossweiher. This topographical arrangement reflects the site's medieval origins as a Wasserburg and was retained during later phases of construction. The surrounding park and water features formed an integral part of the palace ensemble and continue to define the historical landscape of the area.

== History ==
=== Medieval phase ===
Written sources indicate the existence of a moated castle at Dierdorf by the early 14th century (1328). The medieval structure is generally classified as a Wasserburg, a type of lowland fortification typical of the region. Although documentary evidence is limited, the early castle is usually associated with the Lords of Isenburg-Braunsberg. During the Thirty Years’ War (1618–1648), the medieval castle sustained extensive damage. The lead was stripped from the roofs in order to be cast into cannonballs. Following the conflict, it ceased to function as a permanent noble residence. Around 1674, the castle was described as being in poor condition.

=== Baroque palace ===
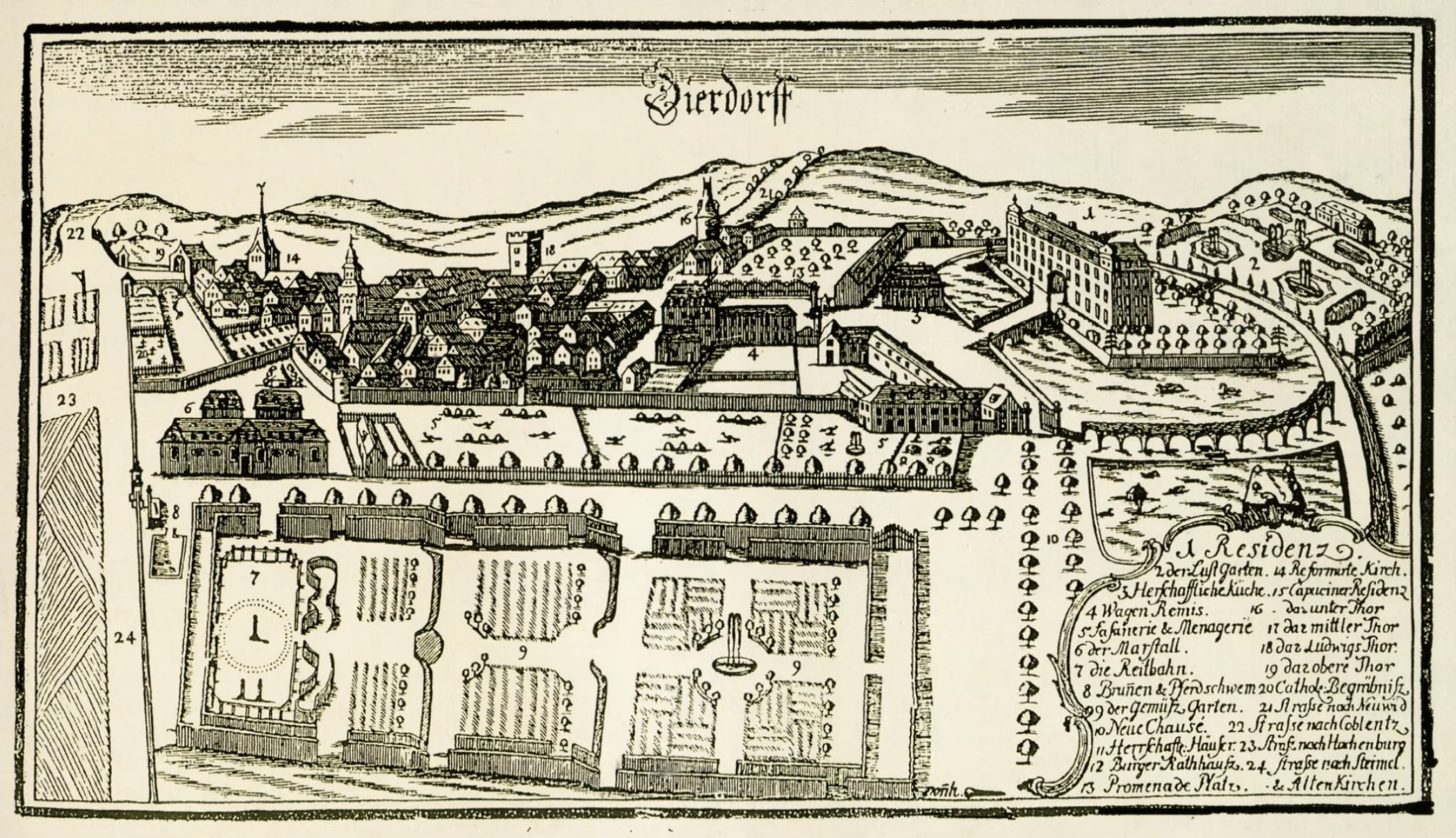
The village and castle of Dierdorf by JG Zeyher (1779)

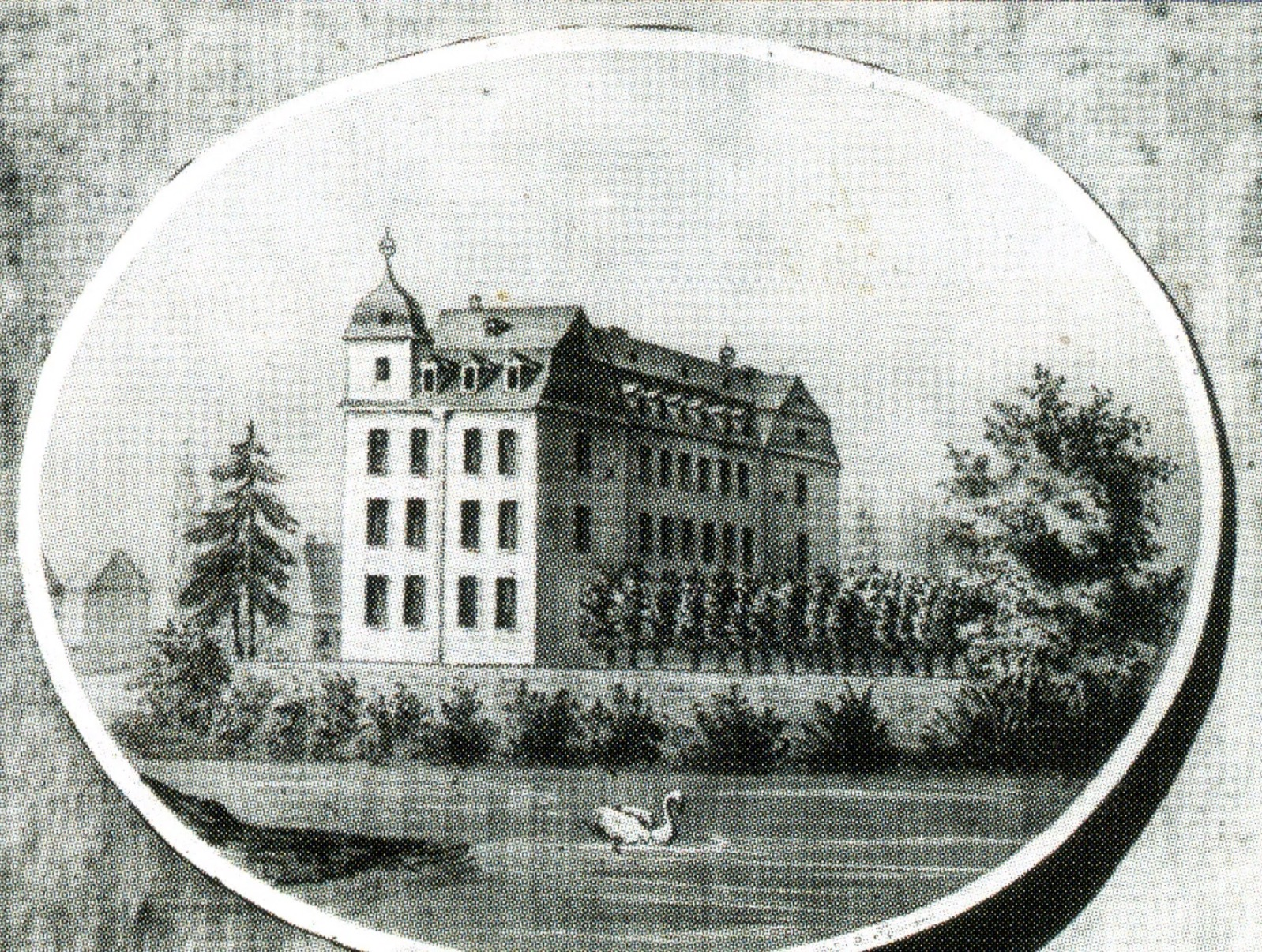
Schloss Dierdorf at the start of the 19th century

From the late 17th century onward, Schloss Dierdorf was closely associated with the House of Wied-Runkel, a cadet branch of the House of Wied. The territory of Wied-Runkel originated as a partition of the County of Wied and developed into an independent imperial county, before being elevated to the rank of a principality in 1791.

The Wied-Runkel line was founded by Maximilian Heinrich of Wied-Runkel (1681–1706), who received the Upper County of Wied from his grandfather, Friedrich “the Elder”, in 1692, thereby establishing the younger Wied-Runkel branch. During his brief reign, Maximilian Heinrich pursued a military career in the service of the Landgraviate of Hesse-Darmstadt. His rule ended abruptly when he was killed in a duel in 1706.

He was succeeded by his minor son Johann Ludwig Adolf of Wied-Runkel (1705–1762), who became one of the most influential rulers of the dynasty. Johann Ludwig Adolf resided primarily at Schloss Dierdorf, where he died in 1762. His reign was characterised by territorial expansion through inheritance—most notably the acquisition of the County of Kriechingen—as well as administrative consolidation and military service within the Holy Roman Empire. He also pursued a comparatively tolerant religious policy, formally permitting Catholic worship within his predominantly Protestant territories. Following the extinction of the ruling Cirksena dynasty, Johann Ludwig Adolf unsuccessfully attempted to assert claims to the Principality of East Frisia.

Between 1701 and 1724, the counts of Wied-Runkel commissioned the construction of a new palace on the site of the former medieval castle. This building phase resulted in a Baroque residence intended to serve as the principal seat of the counts. While the palace retained the traditional island location within the Schlossweiher, it replaced the defensive character of the medieval Wasserburg with a representative residential complex suited to early modern princely court life.

Johann Ludwig Adolf was succeeded by his son Christian Ludwig of Wied-Runkel (1732–1791), who continued the consolidation of the county and strengthened its position within imperial institutions. In 1791, Emperor Leopold II elevated Christian Ludwig to the rank of Imperial Prince, thereby transforming the County of Wied-Runkel into a principality. This elevation marked the political apex of the dynasty. Christian Ludwig, however, died later the same year, and the principality passed to his son Karl Ludwig (1763–1824), who was married to princess Caroline of Nassau-Weilburg (1770–1828).

Karl Ludwig resided at Schloss Dierdorf and ruled during a period of profound political upheaval. The French Revolutionary Wars led to the occupation and eventual loss of the dynasty's territories west of the Rhine. Following the mediatization of 1806, Wied-Runkel lost its sovereignty and was incorporated into the Duchy of Nassau and other Napoleonic client states. Although Karl Ludwig Friedrich Alexander retained his princely title, he was reduced to the status of a Standesherr (mediatised lord).

In 1796, the palace underwent further structural alterations or expansion, likely reflecting changing functional requirements and late 18th-century stylistic preferences.

Karl Ludwig died childless in March 1824. He was briefly succeeded by his brother Friedrich Ludwig of Wied-Runkel (1770–1824), an Austrian field marshal lieutenant with a distinguished military career, who died later the same year, in April 1824. With his death, the Wied-Runkel line became extinct. Schloss Dierdorf and the remaining princely estates passed to the Wied-Neuwied branch of the family, represented by Prince Johann August Karl of Wied, from whom the present-day Princes of Wied descend.

=== Decline and demolition ===
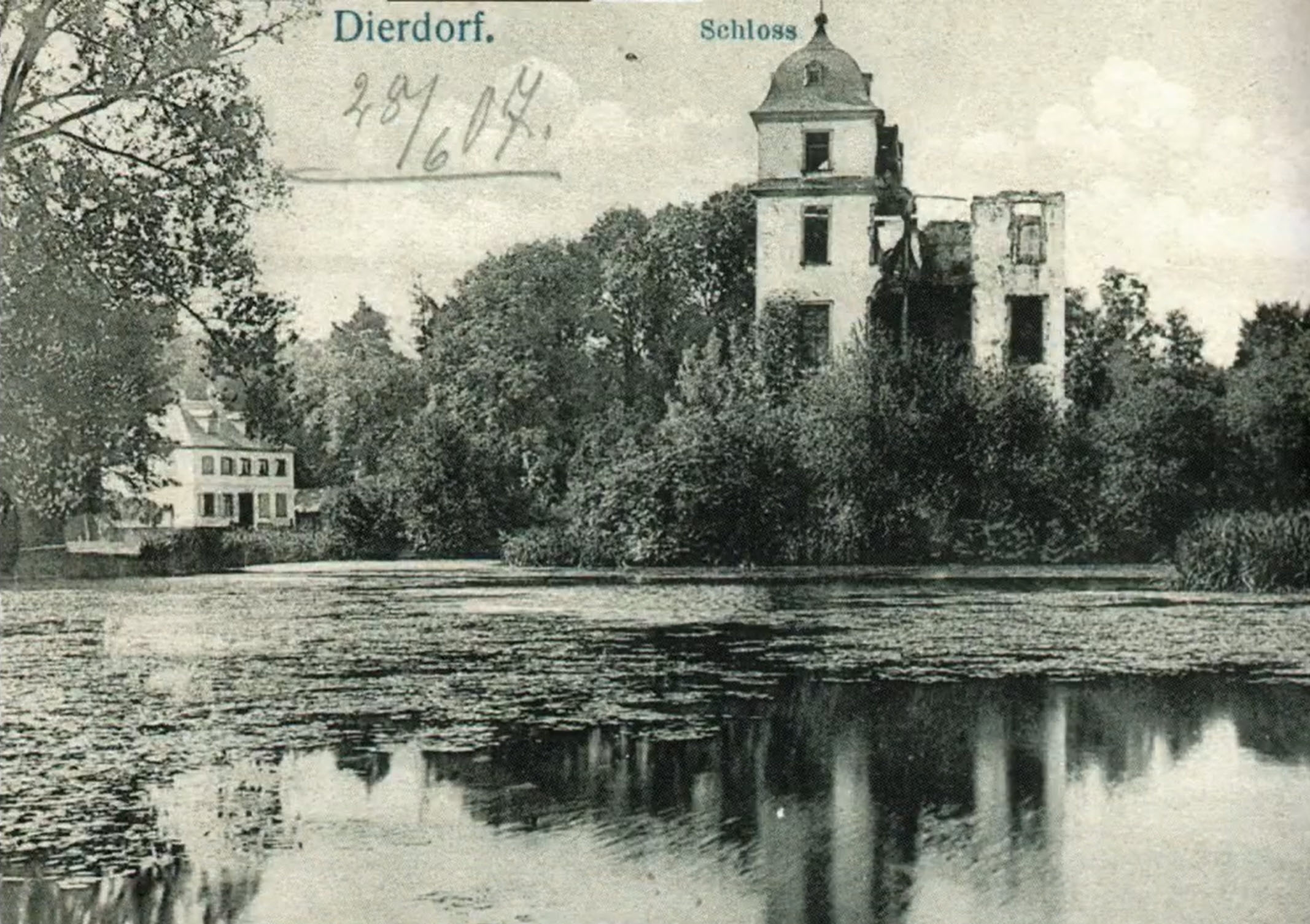
Schloss Dierdorf in ruins around 1900

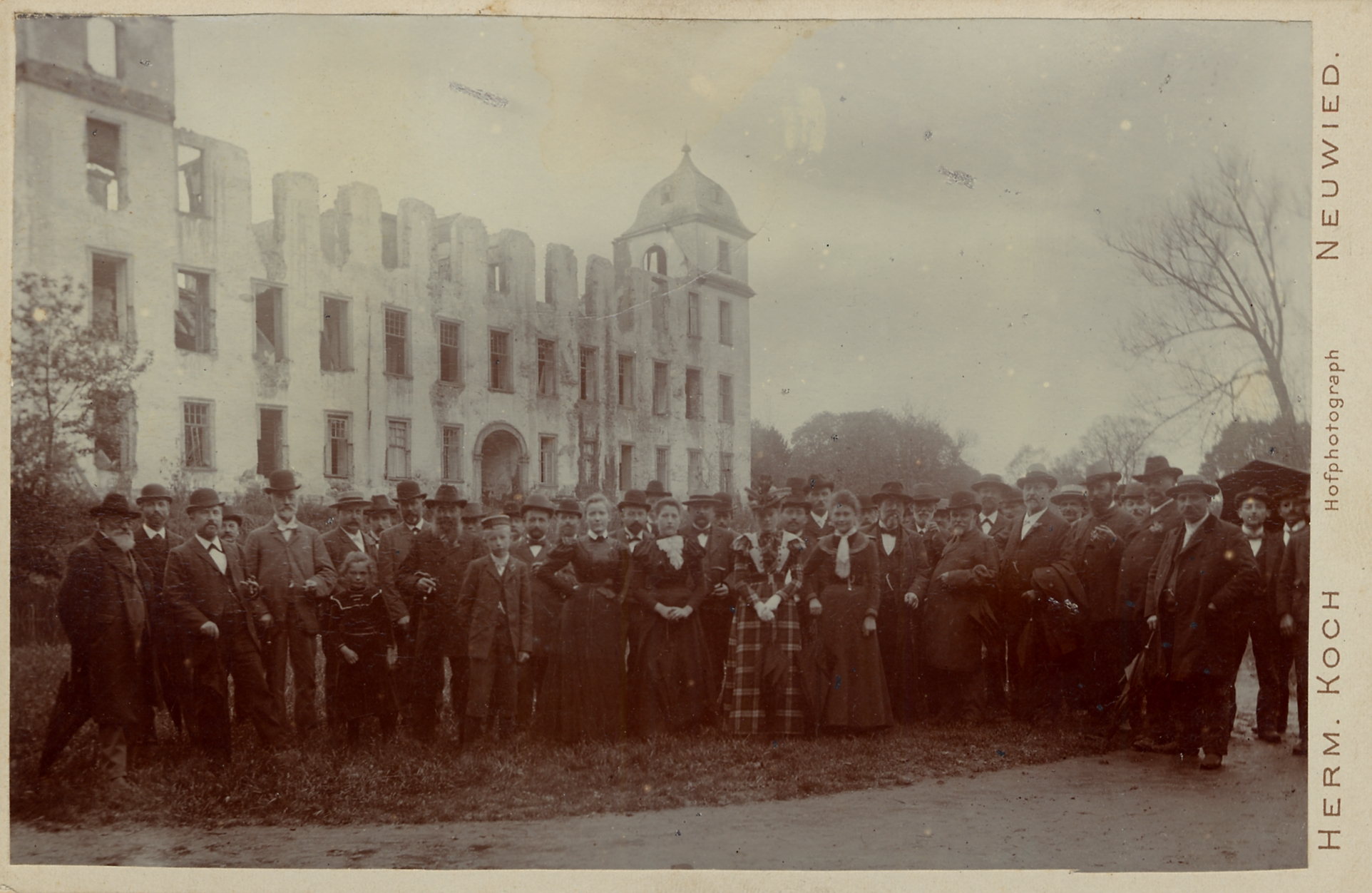
Excursion of the Neuwied Society for Natural History to Schloss Dierdorf (January 1901)

By the mid-19th century, Schloss Dierdorf had largely lost its residential function. The princes of Wied only used the castle occasionally during the hunting season. During the Franco-Prussian War of 1870–71, the building was temporarily used as a military hospital.

After the Prince of Wied and the local municipality were unable to reach an agreement on the maintenance of the building, its deliberate abandonment was initiated from 1892 onwards, beginning with the removal of the roof. The Evangelical congregation subsequently submitted a request to be allowed to reuse the stone for the construction of their new Evangelical church in Dierdorf. In 1902, the structure was demolished by blasting; thirty-six pioneer troops required eight days to complete the demolition.

== Architecture ==
No original architectural plans or elevations of Schloss Dierdorf are known to survive. The appearance of the Baroque palace is therefore primarily reconstructed from historical prints, postcards, and written descriptions dating from the late 19th and early 20th centuries.

The baroque palace was probably conceived as a four-winged complex with a square ground plan and four corner towers, following the general layout of the earlier moated castle. In practice, however, the design appears to have been only partially realised. Completed were a single main wing of thirteen bays (45 metres wide), together with three-bay projections of the two adjoining wings set at right angles. All parts were three storeys high, crowned with mansard roofs, while the corner axes were accentuated by towers with domed roofs (21 metres high). Several ancillary buildings formed part of the complex, some of which survive in altered form.

== Park and gardens ==
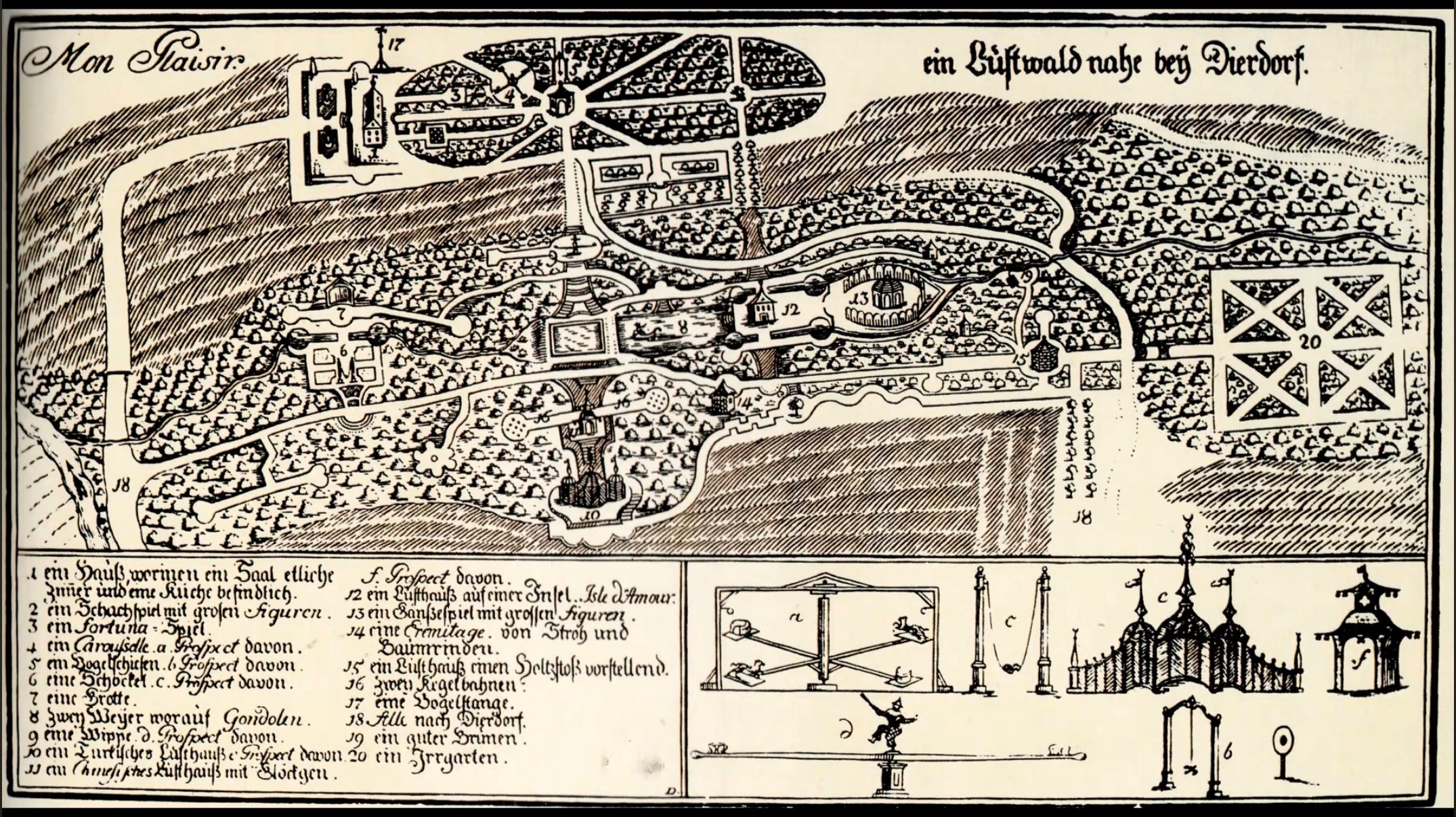
Plan of the Monplaisir pleasure garden near Dierdorf castle

The palace was set within a landscaped ensemble defined by the Schlossweiher, its islands, and the surrounding parkland. The park was laid out in the mid-18th century in French formal style, incorporating ornamental features such as fountains, a menagerie and an orangery. In the early 19th century, the grounds were remodelled in the English landscape style, reflecting changing aesthetic preferences.

=== MonPlaisir pleasure garden ===
The garden was connected by a lime-tree avenue to the summer retreat and pleasure ground known as Mon Plaisir, situated in the valley of the Wienauer stream (German: Wienauer Bach). Monplaisir means "my delight" in French. Created in the 18th century, the ensemble comprised a small palace and various ornamental follies, including a Turkish pavilion, a Chinese pavilion, a carousel, a swing, a labyrinth a pond with gondolas and a grotto. In its conception and layout, the garden shows affinities with contemporary Rococo pleasure gardens such as Sanspareil or the Eremitage in Bayreuth.

At that time, the small horticultural Arcadia must have made a strong impression on a royal garden inspector and prompted him to mention the Dierdorf palace gardens in the same breath as those of Potsdam and Schwetzingen— not because of their size, but rather on account of the fine groupings of trees and other aspects of their design.

== Mausoleum of the Princes of Wied-Runkel ==
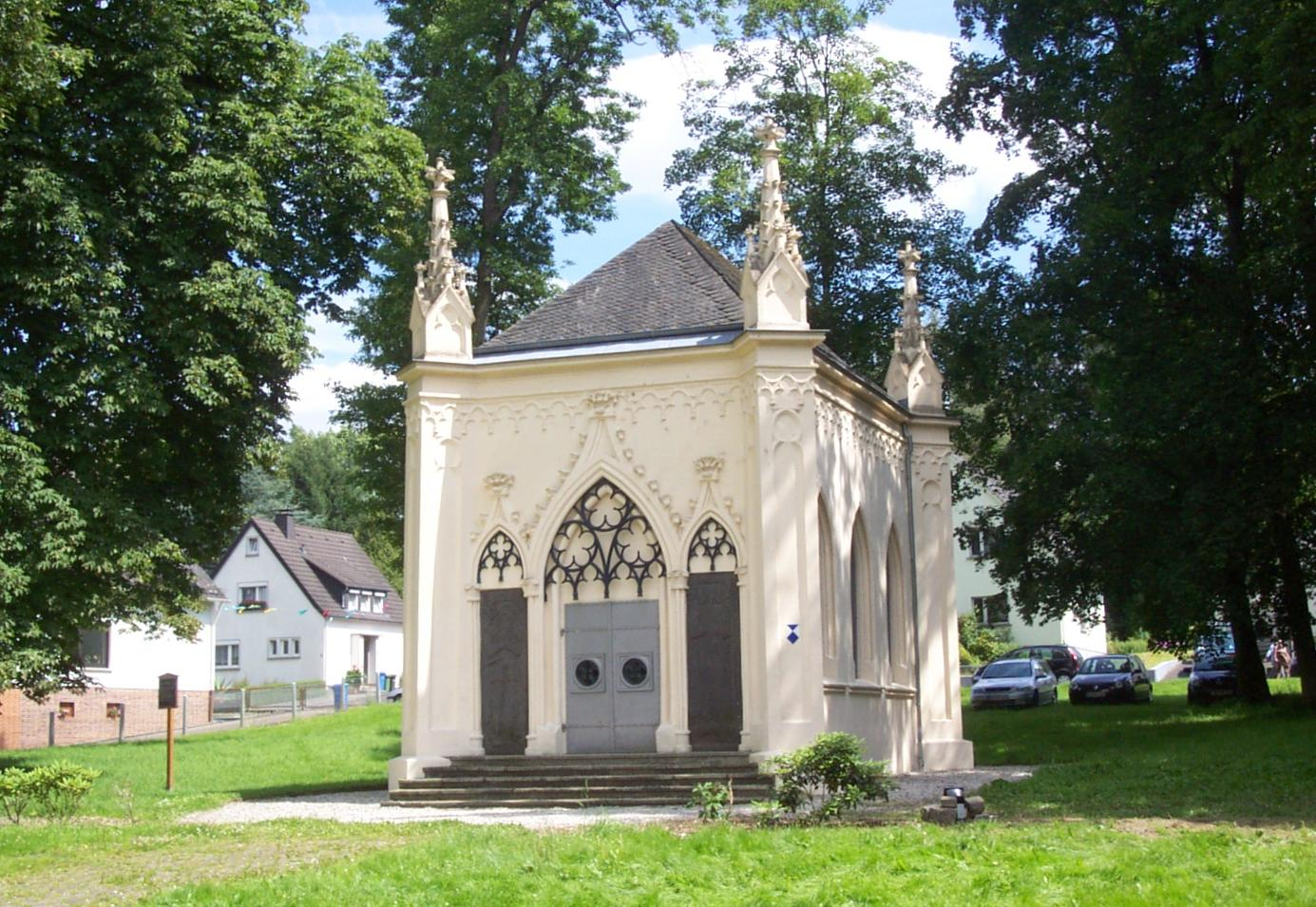
The Mausoleum of the Princes of Wied-Runkel

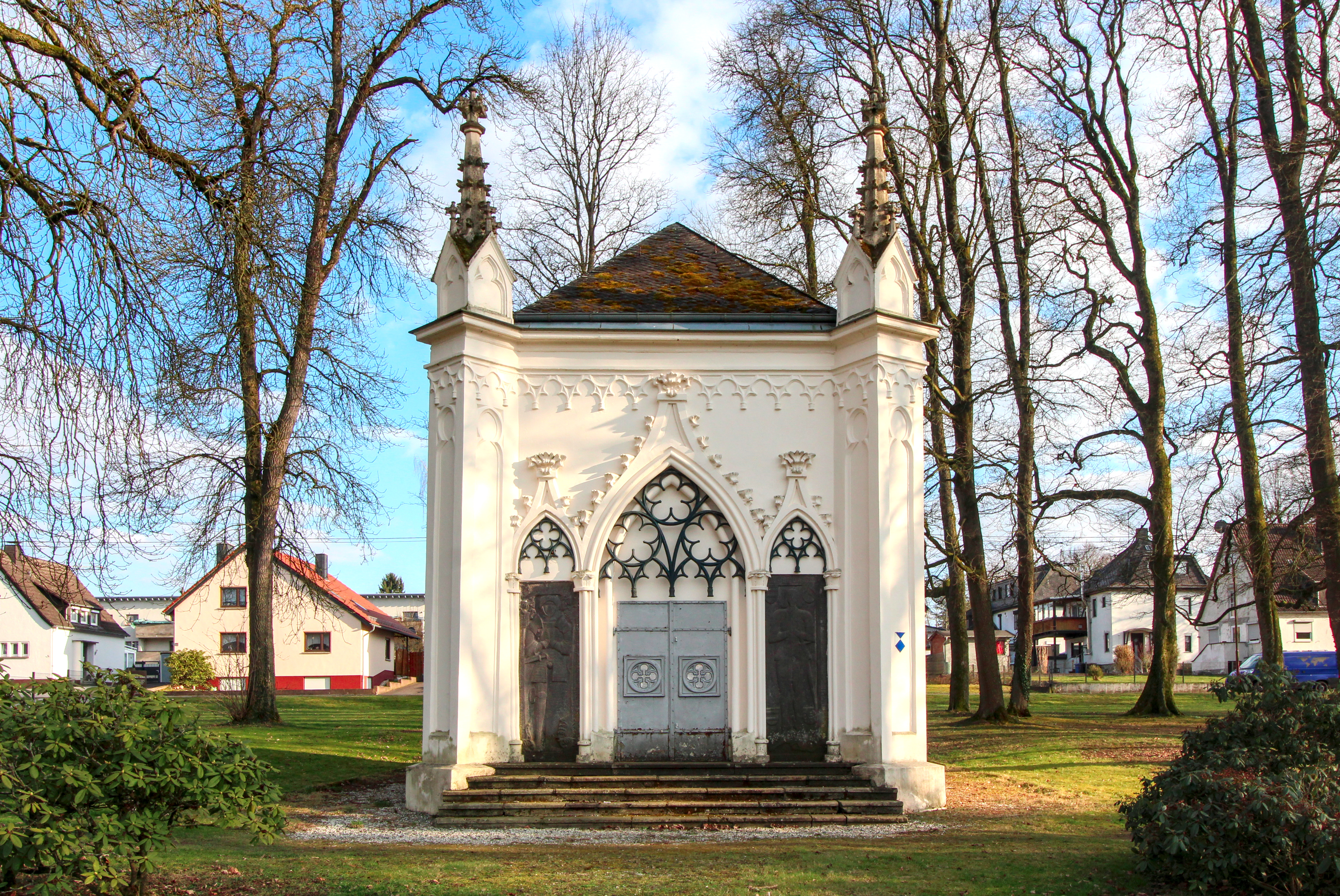
The front of the Mausoleum

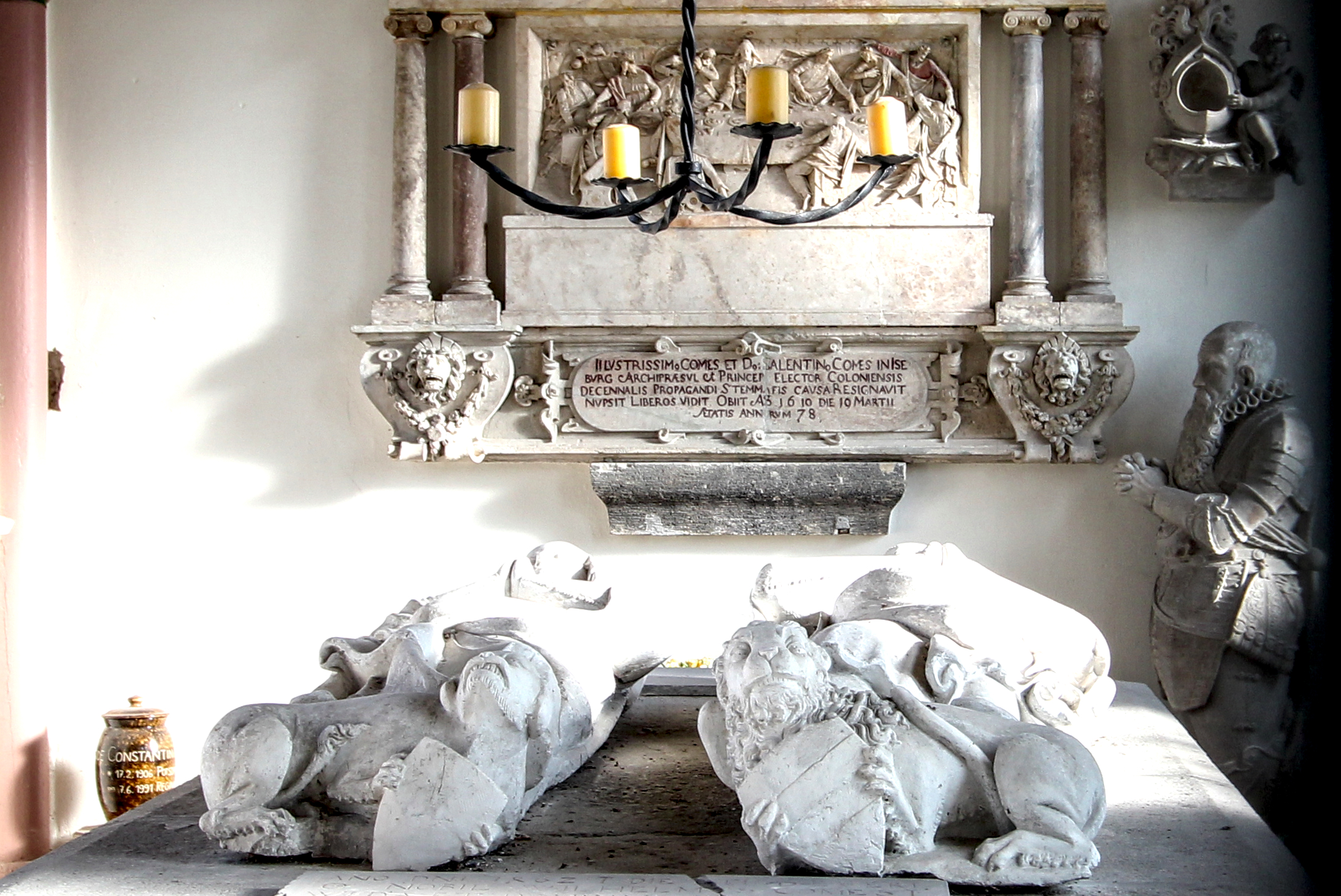
The interior of the Mausoleum

The Mausoleum of Dierdorf, constructed between 1816 and 1821, is the most substantial surviving structure associated with Schloss Dierdorf. It was commissioned by Prince Karl Ludwig of Wied-Runkel as the dynastic burial place of the House of Wied-Runkel and is situated within the former palace park. The building is protected as a cultural monument.

The mausoleum was erected in the context of the secularisation and mediatization of the early 19th century, which led to the dissolution of traditional burial sites of the Wied family, notably Rommersdorf Abbey and the Collegiate Church of St Florin in Koblenz. Contemporary archival sources indicate that the construction was also intended to safeguard and reunite surviving ancestral tomb monuments that had been threatened with destruction following the repurposing of these ecclesiastical buildings.

Architecturally, the mausoleum is an early example of the Gothic Revival architecture in the Rhineland and has been described by Georg Dehio as one of the earliest monuments of the so-called altdeutscher Stil in the region. The small rectangular structure is built of rendered brick and articulated with buttresses, pointed-arch friezes, and tracery, while cast-iron elements are employed for window mullions and decorative details. A crypt beneath the building contains the burials of members of the Wied-Runkel line.

Unlike the palace itself, which declined in importance and was demolished in 1902, the mausoleum was conceived as a permanent dynastic memorial. It remains a key source for understanding the former princely presence in Dierdorf and the cultural strategies through which the House of Wied-Runkel sought to preserve its historical identity after the loss of territorial sovereignty.

== Present condition and legacy ==
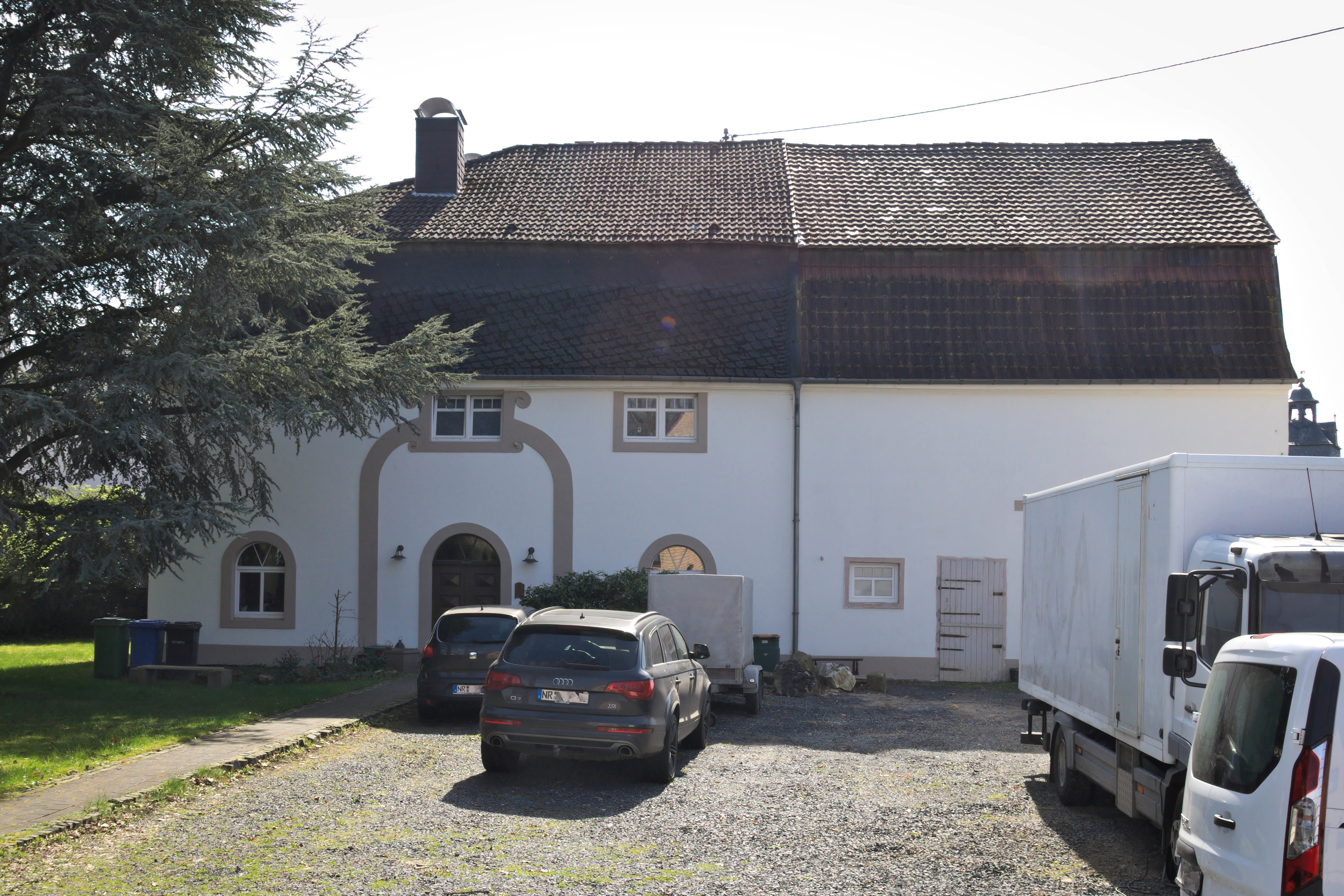
A surviving ancillary building of Schloss Dierdorf

No above-ground remains of the palace building survive. Nevertheless, the Schlossweiher, elements of the former park, surviving ancillary buildings, and the mausoleum together preserve the spatial memory of the former residence. These elements provide important evidence for the historical development of Dierdorf as a princely seat in the early modern period.

== See also ==
- Runkel Castle, the other seat of the princes of Wied-Runkel

== Literature ==
- Krämer, Karl Emerich (1982). Von Burg zu Burg durch den Westerwald (in German). Duisburg: Verlag.
- Neu, Heinrich; Weigert, Hans (1940). Die Kunstdenkmäler des Kreises Neuwied (in German). Düsseldorf: L. Schwann. pp. 83–97.
- Groß, Wilhelm (2002). Aus alter Zeit I – Chronik von Dierdorf (Neuauflage der Originalausgabe von 1900) (in German). Niederhofen: Verlag Reinhard Zado. ISBN 3936256020.
- Schmidt, Arno (2007). "Mon Plaisir: Herrschaftlicher Lustwald zwischen Wienau und Raubach". Landkreis Neuwied: Heimatjahrbuch des Landkreises Neuwied (in German). Vol. 42. pp. 177–182.
- Löhr, Hermann-Joseph (2008). Geheimnisvolle Burgen- und Schlösserwelt vom Drachenfels bis Engers (in German). Asbach: Verlag Media-World GmbH.
- Meyer, Michael (2023). Chronik der Stadt Dierdorf und der Grafschaft Wied - Teil I (in German). Books on Demand. ISBN 9783757824860.
- Meyer, Michael (2023). Chronik der Stadt Dierdorf und der Grafschaft Wied - Teil II (in German). Books on Demand. ISBN 9783757891077.
