= Bruno II of Isenburg-Braunsberg =

Bruno II of Isenburg-Braunsberg (born around 1179) was the Count of Isenburg-Braunsberg from 1210 until 1255.

| Preceded by: | Bruno II | Succeeded by: |
|---|---|---|
| Bruno I of Isenburg-Isenburg | Count of Isenburg-Braunsberg; 1210–1255 | Bruno III |
