= William II of Isenburg-Wied =

14th century aristocrat in Isenburg-Braunsberg

William II of Isenburg-Wied (German: Wilhelm II. von Isenburg-Wied) was the Count of Isenburg-Braunsberg from 1383 until 1388, and the Count of Isenburg-Wied from 1388 until 1409. William renamed his state Isenburg-Wied in 1388.

Preceded by:	William II		Succeeded by:
John I	Count of Isenburg-Braunsberg; 1383–1388	Count of Isenburg-Wied; 1388–1409	Gerlach I
