= Bruno III =

Bruno III may refer to:

- Bruno III of Berg (Archbishop of Cologne and Duke of Westphalia from 1191 until 1193)
- Bruno III of Isenburg-Braunsberg (Count of Isenburg-Braunsberg from 1255 until 1278)
