= Grenzau Castle =

- Burg Grenzau, Burg Gransioie (Großfreuden)
- Höhr-Grenzhausen
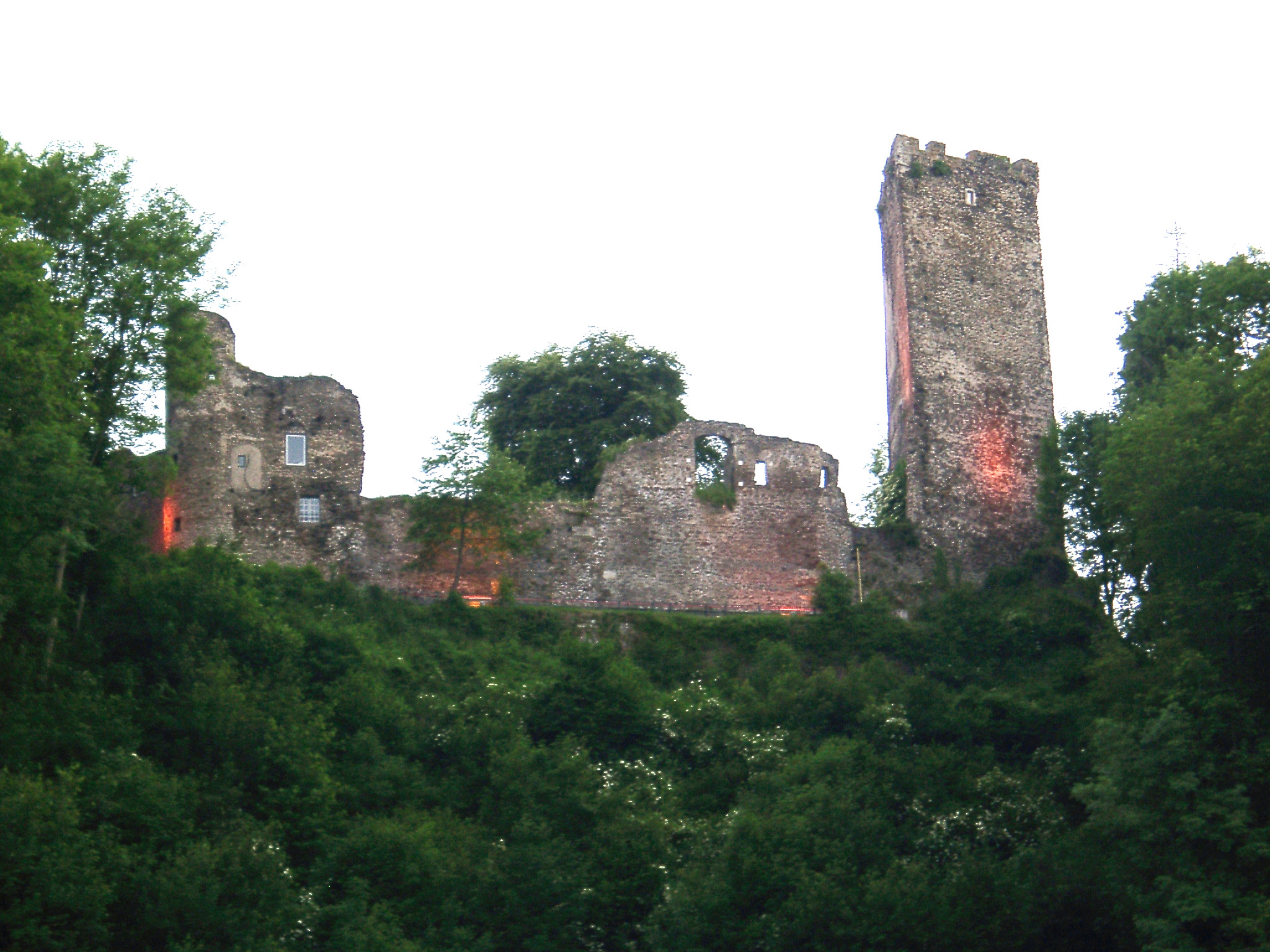
- Grenzau Castle

Site information
- Type: hill castle, spur castle
- Code: DE-RP
- Condition: largely preserved

Location
- Coordinates: 50°27′01″N 7°39′20″E
- Height: 250 m above sea level (NN)

Site history
- Built: ca. 1210

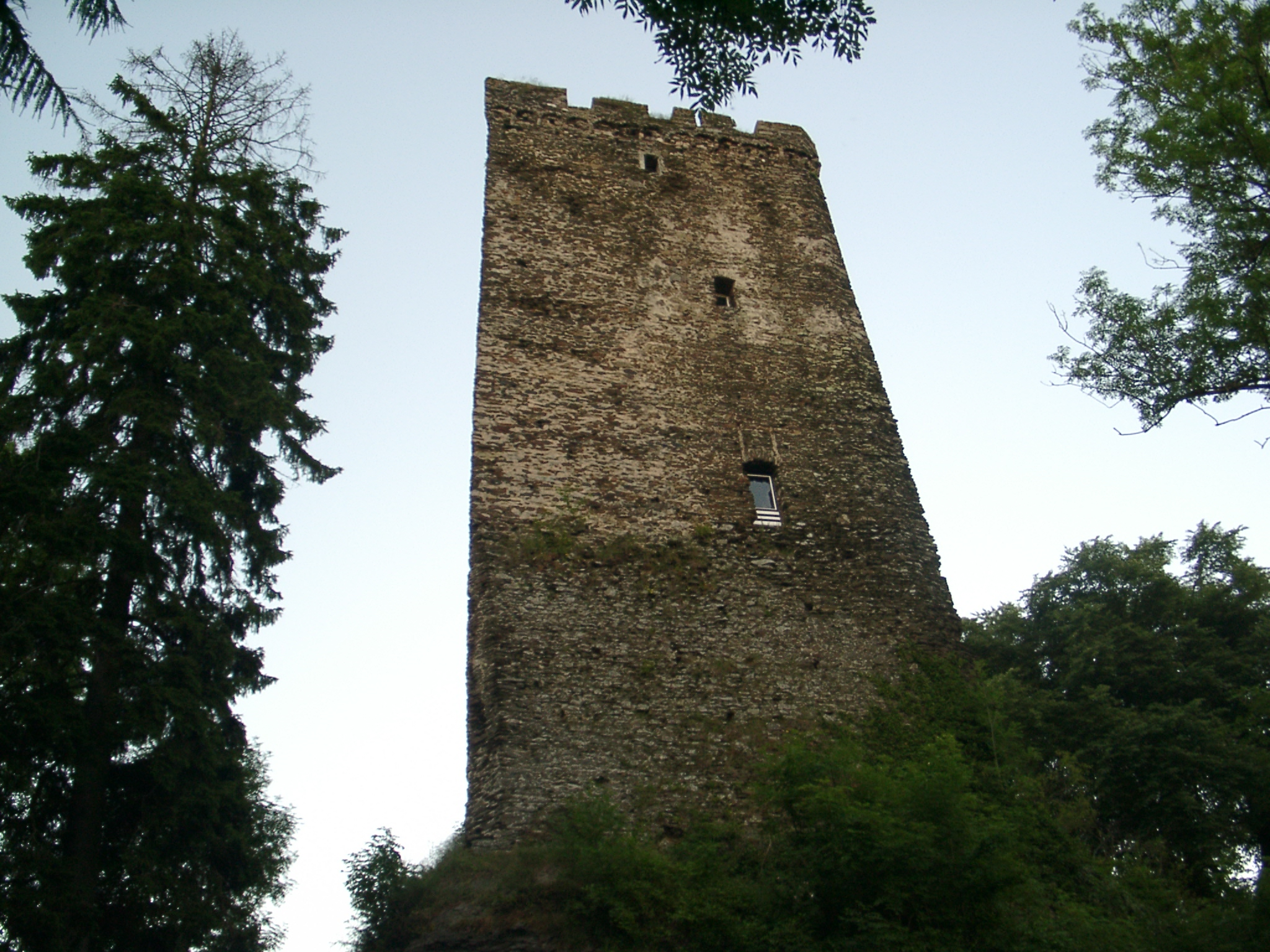
The bergfried

Grenzau Castle (German: Burg Grenzau) is a ruined spur castle at 250 m above sea level (NN) near Höhr-Grenzhausen in the county of Westerwaldkreis in the state of Rhineland-Palatinate. It is the only castle in Germany with a triangular bergfried.

== History ==
The castle was built by Henry I of Isenburg around 1210 as Burg Gransioie, Old Fr. for "great joy" (Fr.: grande joie), from which its name developed through Gran Joie (1238), Gransoge (1275), Grensoy(ge) (1331, 1343, 1346), Grensawe (1356), La Grange (1525), Grensove, Grensauwe, Grentzawe and finally Grenzau. The castle is first recorded in a document dated 6 January 1213 that states the Isenburgs had flouted the rights of Laach Abbey. In 1324 the middle line of the lords of Isenburg-Grenzau lived at the castle.

In 1346, Archbishop Baldwin of Trier captured the castle during the Grenzau Feud. In 1347, in spite of his victory at Gumschlag over the citizens of Koblenz, Philip I had to recognise its feudal lordship. Emperor Charles V awarded Frankfurt town rights to Grenzau. In 1439, the older Salentine line of the lords and counts of Isenburg lived at the castle. In 1460 the castle was returned to Gerlach II by Electoral Trier. In 1557 the younger Salentine line of Isenburg counts lived here and reinforced the fortifications with artillery bastions in the north and a roundel on the southern hillside.

During the Thirty Years' War the castle was set on fire on 14 March 1635 by French troops. In 1664, after the death of Count Ernest of Isenburg-Grenzau, the badly damaged castle went back into the ownership of the Electorate of Trier. In 1700 the mill below the castle was replaced and, in 1722, a house was built for the Trier admodiator at "Schloss Grenzach", however the castle became noticeably dilapidated. In 1788 the castle chapel was demolished and rebuilt in a new location. In 1793 the roof of the castle tower collapsed.

In 1803, following a Reichsdeputationshauptschluss the castle went to Nassau-Weilburg. In 1866, it went to the kingdom of Prussia. In 1925, the castle was bought by a government architect, Rudolph Arthur Zichner, from Wiesbaden and made available for the Nerother Wandervogel - a youth group. In 1953, Hans Spiegel bought the castle and carried out preservation work. Since his death in 1987, the castle has been cared for by a family society.

== Description ==
The spur castle has two baileys: an inner ward forming the heart of the fortification, and an outer ward to the west. On the south side is an outwork (Bollwerk), built around 1540, with a round battery tower (Geschützturm) and two flanking walls (Flügelmauern), the whole separated from the enceinte by a neck ditch. The triangular, mid-13th century bergfried, 32 metres (105 ft) high, stands above the northern neck ditch. All that survives from the 14th century is the gatehouse, flanked by a round tower (tourelle), on the south side of the former enceinte. On the west side, the ruins of the palas can still be made out.

== Literature ==
- Hans Spiegel: Chronik der Burg Grenzau. In: Burgen und Schlösser 25 (1984), S. 22–52
- Dietmar Spiegel: Der Architekt Hans Spiegel und "seine Grenzau" 1954 bis 2004: Sicherung und neuzeitlicher Ausbau einer Burgruine. In: Burgen und Schlösser 45 (2004), pp. 93–97
- Lorenz Frank: Der Bergfried der Burgruine Grenzau: Neue Beobachtungen zur Baugeschichte. In: Burgen und Schlösser 45 (2004), pp. 98–103
- Alexander Thon, Stefan Ulrich: „... wie ein Monarch mitten in seinem Hofstaate thront“. Burgen am unteren Mittelrhein. Schnell & Steiner, Regensburg, 2010, ISBN 978-3-7954-2210-3, pp. 74-79.
