= Bruno III of Isenburg-Braunsberg =

Count of Isenburg-Braunsberg

Bruno III of Isenburg-Braunsberg was the Count of Isenburg-Braunsberg from 1255 until 1278.

| Preceded by: | Bruno III | Succeeded by: |
|---|---|---|
| Bruno II | Count of Isenburg-Braunsberg; 1255–1278 | John I |
