= John I of Isenburg-Braunsberg =

Count of Isenburg-Braunsberg

John I of Isenburg-Braunsberg was the Count of Isenburg-Braunsberg from 1278 until 1327.

Preceded by:	John I	Succeeded by:
Bruno III	Count of Isenburg-Braunsberg; 1278–1327	William I
