= Kempenich =

- Municipality
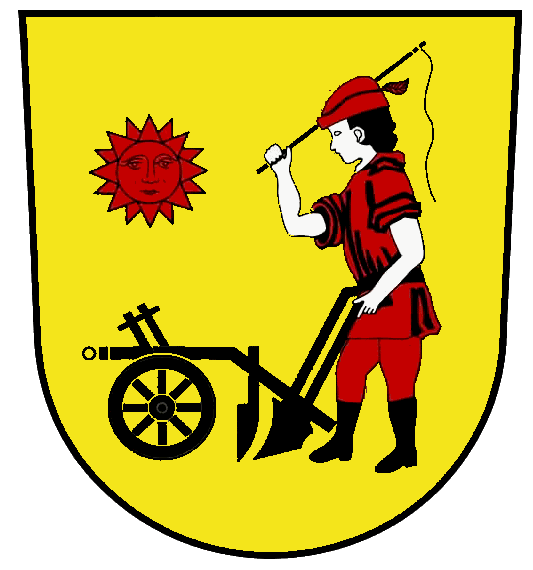
- Coat of arms

- Location of Kempenich within Ahrweiler district
- Interactive map of Kempenich
- Location within Germany Location within Rhineland-Palatinate
- Coordinates: 50°25′11″N 7°7′08″E
- Country: Germany
- State: Rhineland-Palatinate
- District: Ahrweiler
- Municipal assoc.: Brohltal

Government
  - Mayor (2019–24): Dominik Schmitz

Area
  - Total: 11.91 km^{2} (4.60 sq mi)
- Elevation: 460 m (1,510 ft)

Population (2025-12-31)
  - Total: 1,874
  - Density: 157.3/km^{2} (407.5/sq mi)
- Time zone: UTC+01:00 (CET)
  - Summer (DST): UTC+02:00 (CEST)
- Postal codes: 56746
- Dialling codes: 02655
- Vehicle registration: AW
- Website: www.kempenich.de

Kempenich is a municipality in the district of Ahrweiler, in Rhineland-Palatinate, Germany.
