= Grenzau Feud =

Medieval conflict

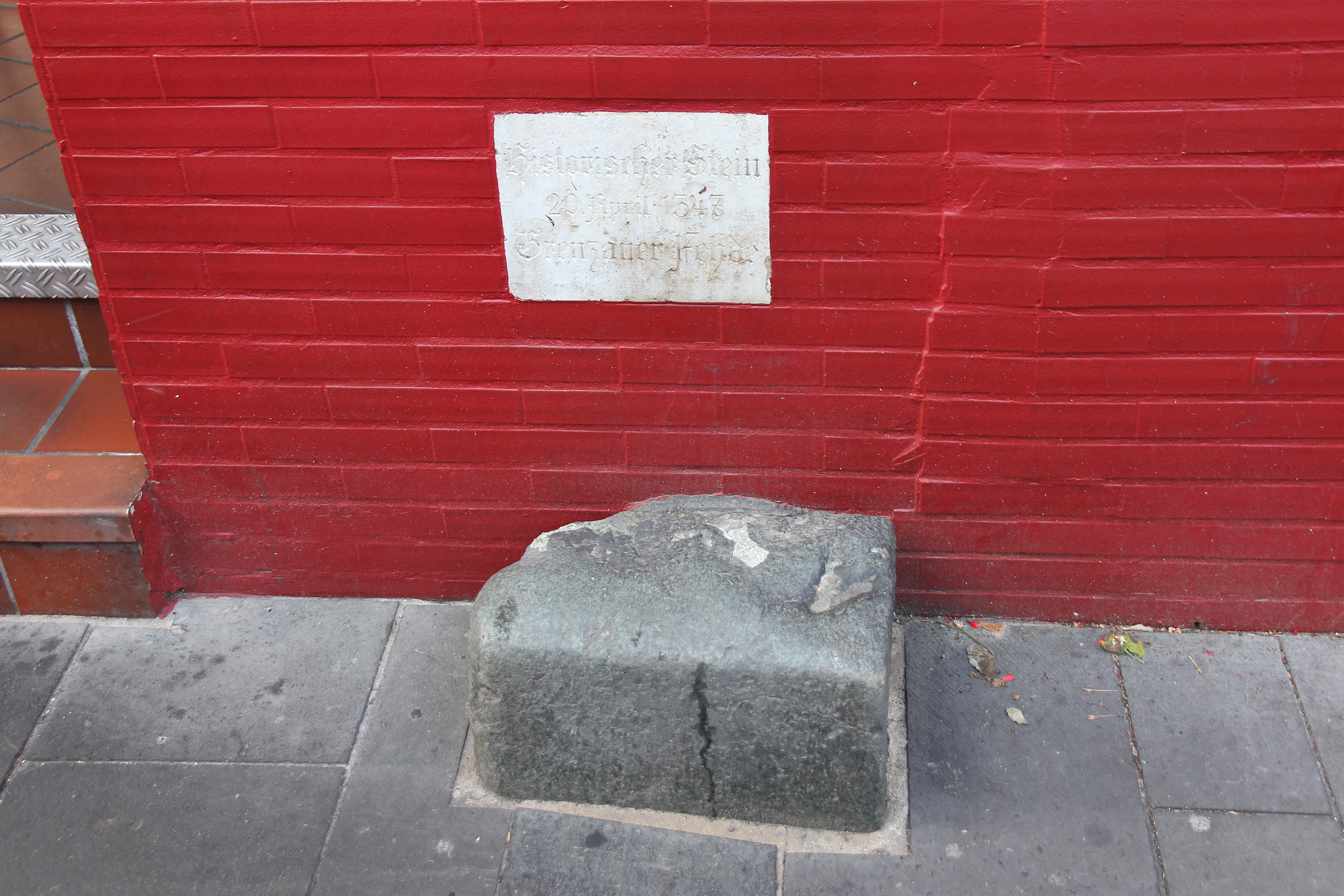
Memorial stone with information board at the old parsonage in the Altstadt of Koblenz

The Grenzau Feud (German: Grenzauer Fehde) was a warlike conflict between the troops of Koblenz in the Electorate of Trier on the one hand and Lord Philip of Isenburg and Lord Reynard of Westerburg on the other at Grenzau on 20 April 1347. The Koblenz soldiers were ambushed and 172 were killed.

Processions and memorial services to commemorate the fallen citizens were held in the churches of Koblenz on the Friday after Easter annually until about 1800. After mass in the Church of Our Lady, a citizen of Koblenz used to climb a stone block on a house opposite (then the parsonage) and told the story of the feud..

The Grenzau Feud is classified as one of the warlike conflicts surrounding the election of Charles IV. From 1314, Louis IV was the Roman-German king. After 1340, however, the German electors increasingly distanced themselves from Louis and in 1346 elected Charles IV as counter-king. The election of Charles IV marked the beginning of a civil war between king and counter-king. On the side of Charles were the Archbishop of Trier, Baldwin, and the Archbishop of Cologne, Walram. Louis's allies included the Limburg dynasty of Gerlach and Reinhard of Westerburg. In the course of these disputes, Reinhard captured Grenzau Castle in the Westerwald mountains. When they attempted to recapture the castle, the troops of Koblenz were ambushed. Following the massacre of 172 Koblenz citizens, Reinhard had to escape and fled to Gerlach at Limburg Castle. Now the Lords of Limburg had the castle as a fiefdom, one third each from the Empire, the Landgrave of Hesse and the Archbishop of Trier. Baldwin advanced on the castle in Limburg and demanded that it was opened, citing the feudal treaty. But Gerlach rejected this, because he was only obliged to remain loyal to Baldwin if the feud did not go against the Reich, the Archbishop and the Landgrave. Baldwin withdrew, leaving it as unfinished business.

== Literature ==
- Hellmuth Gensicke: Selbstbehauptung im Westerwald. In: Franz-Josef Heyen (ed.): Balduin von Luxemburg. Erzbischof von Trier – Kurfürst des Reiches. 1285–1345. Festschrift aus Anlass des 700. Geburtsjahres (= Quellen und Abhandlungen zur mittelrheinischen Kirchengeschichte. Bd. 53, ISSN 0480-7480). Verlag der Gesellschaft für Mittelrheinische Kirchengeschichte, Mainz 1985, pp. 391–401, hier S. 398, digitalised.
- Franz-Karl Nieder: Die Limburger Dynasten und die deutschen Könige 1292 bis 1356. In: Nassauische Annalen Jg. 117; 2006, pp. 89–107, here pp. 102 ff. digitalised.
