= Princess Caroline of Nassau-Weilburg =

Princess Caroline
- Princess of Wied-Runkel
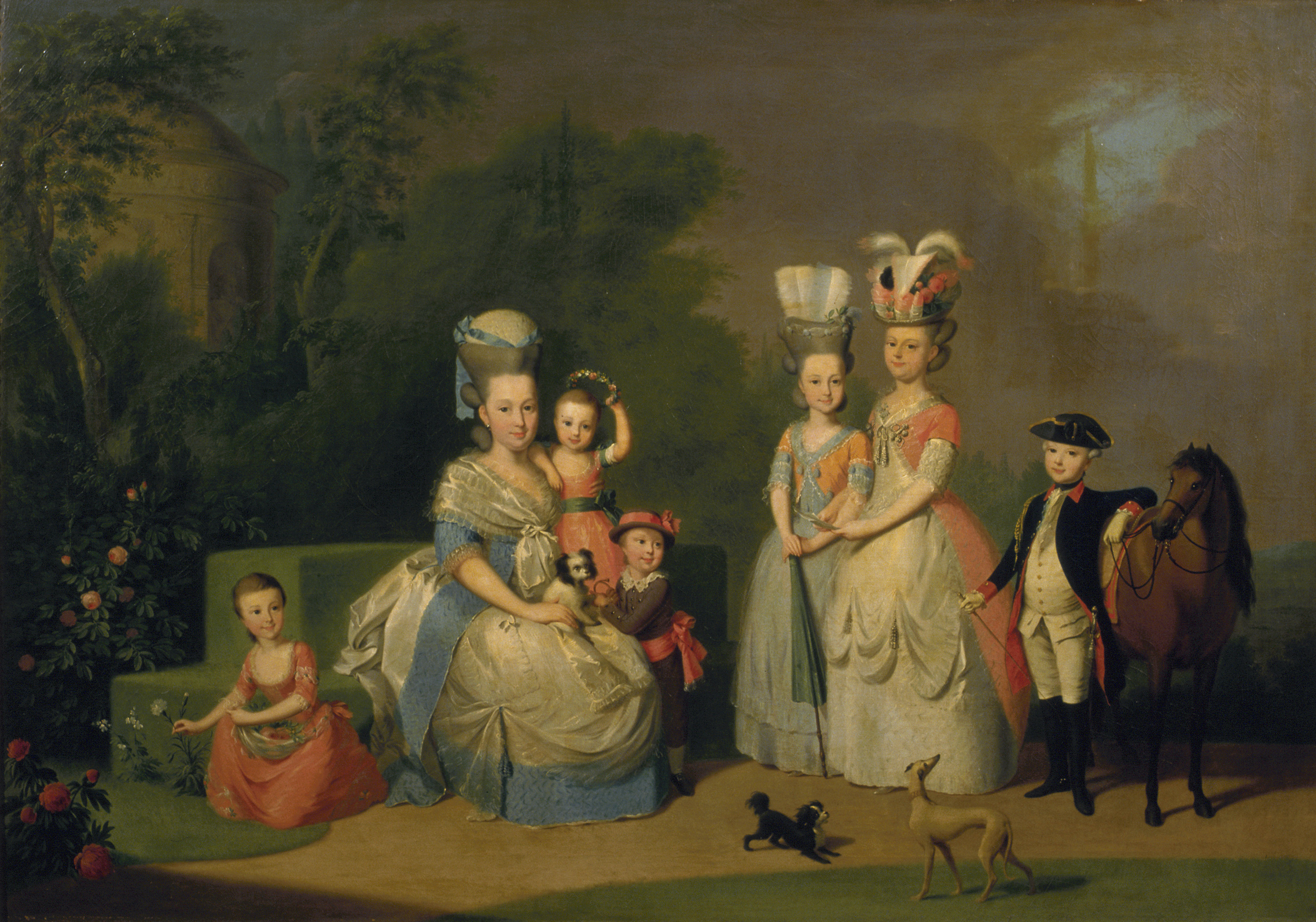
- Caroline on the far left, c. 1778
- Born: 14 February 1770; Kirchheimbolanden, Holy Roman Empire
- Died: 8 July 1828 (aged 58); Wiesbaden
- Spouse: Karl Ludwig, Prince of Wied-Runkel (m. 1787; died 1824)
- House: Nassau-Weilburg
- Father: Charles Christian, Prince of Nassau-Weilburg
- Mother: Princess Carolina of Orange-Nassau

Princess Caroline of Nassau-Weilburg (German: Karoline Luise Friederike von Nassau-Weilburg; 14 February 1770 – 8 July 1828) was a Princess of Nassau-Weilburg, daughter of Charles Christian, Prince of Nassau-Weilburg and Princess Carolina of Orange-Nassau, wife of Prince Karl Ludwig of Wied-Runkel.

== Biography ==
Caroline was born on February 14, 1770, in Kirchheimbolanden. She was the sixth child and the third daughter in the family of Prince Karl Christian of Nassau-Weilburg and his wife Carolina of Orange-Nassau. Had older sisters Maria and Louise and brothers Friedrich Wilhelm and Wilhelm, who died two months later. Later, the family was supplemented by five younger children, of whom son Karl Wilhelm and daughters Amelia and Henrietta reached adulthood.

In May 1787, Caroline lost her mother, however, already in September of that year, she got married.

At the age of 17, she became the wife of Hereditary Count Karl Ludwig of Wied-Runkel, who soon turned 24. The groom was the eldest son of the ruling Count Christian Ludwig. The wedding took place on September 4 1787 in Kirchheimbolanden and. The couple had no children.

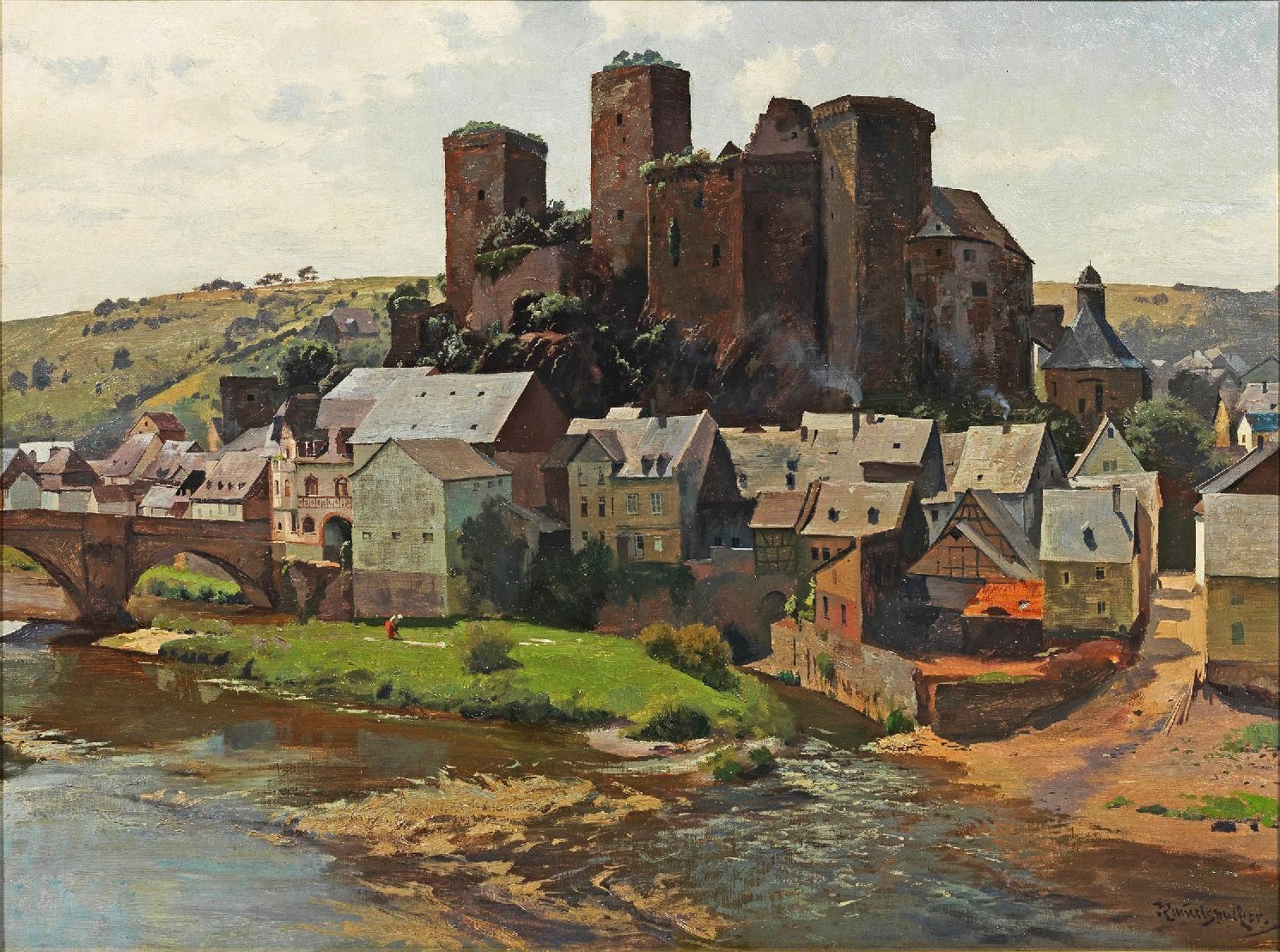
Runkel Castle

In 1791, Christian Ludwig received the title of prince, and died in October of the same year. Caroline's husband became the next ruler of Wied-Runkel. They resided at Dierdorf Castle.

In 1806, with the creation of the Confederation of the Rhine by Napoleon, the principality was mediatized, its lands went to the Grand Duchy of Berg Duchy of Nassau.

Karl Ludwig died on March 9, 1824, in Dierdorf. Since the marriage was childless, after the death of his younger brother in April 1824, the rights to the Wied-Runkel lands passed to Johann Carl August of Wied.

Caroline died on July 8, 1828, in Wiesbaden.

== Ancestry ==
Ancestors of Princess Caroline of Nassau-Weilburg

8. John Ernst, Count of Nassau-Weilburg
4. Charles August, Prince of Nassau-Weilburg
9. Countess Maria Polyxena of Leiningen-Dagsburg-Hardenburg
2. Charles Christian, Prince of Nassau-Weilburg
10. George August, Count of Nassau-Idstein
5. Princess Auguste Friederike of Nassau-Idstein
11. Princess Henriette Dorothea of Oettingen-Oettingen
1. Princess Caroline of Nassau-Weilburg
12. John William Friso, Prince of Orange
6. William IV, Prince of Orange
13. Landgravine Marie Louise of Hesse-Kassel
3. Princess Carolina of Orange-Nassau
14. George II of Great Britain
7. Anne, Princess Royal
15. Caroline of Ansbach
