= County of Kriechingen =

1617–1801 state of the Holy Roman Empire

Coordinates: 49.05°N 6.57°E

The County of Kriechingen was a state of the Holy Roman Empire. It was originally a part of the Duchy of Lorraine and was raised to an imperial estate in 1617. It belonged to the Upper Rhenish Circle. In 1697, Kriechingen was inherited by the Principality of East Frisia, and later by the County of Wied-Runkel. In 1793 Kriechingen was occupied by France; this was recognized by the Holy Roman Empire in the Treaty of Lunéville of 1801.

The county was named after its capital, Kriechingen, today Créhange. At the end of its existence, it had an area of approximately 100 km^{2} and a population of 4000. Between 1766, when Lorraine became a part of France, and 1793, Kriechingen formed two exclaves of the Holy Roman Empire surrounded by French territory.
