= Isenburg-Eisenberg =

Isenburg-Eisenberg
1711–58
Capital; Circle; Bench	Eisenberg none none
Partitioned from Isenburg-Offenbach	1711
Extinct	1758

Isenburg-Eisenberg was the name of a junior, non-immediate line of the House of Isenburg. It was partitioned from Isenburg-Offenbach in 1711, and became extinct in 1758.

Name	Reign
Charles Augustus	1711–1758
