= Princess Carolina of Orange-Nassau =

Dutch regent

Princess Carolina
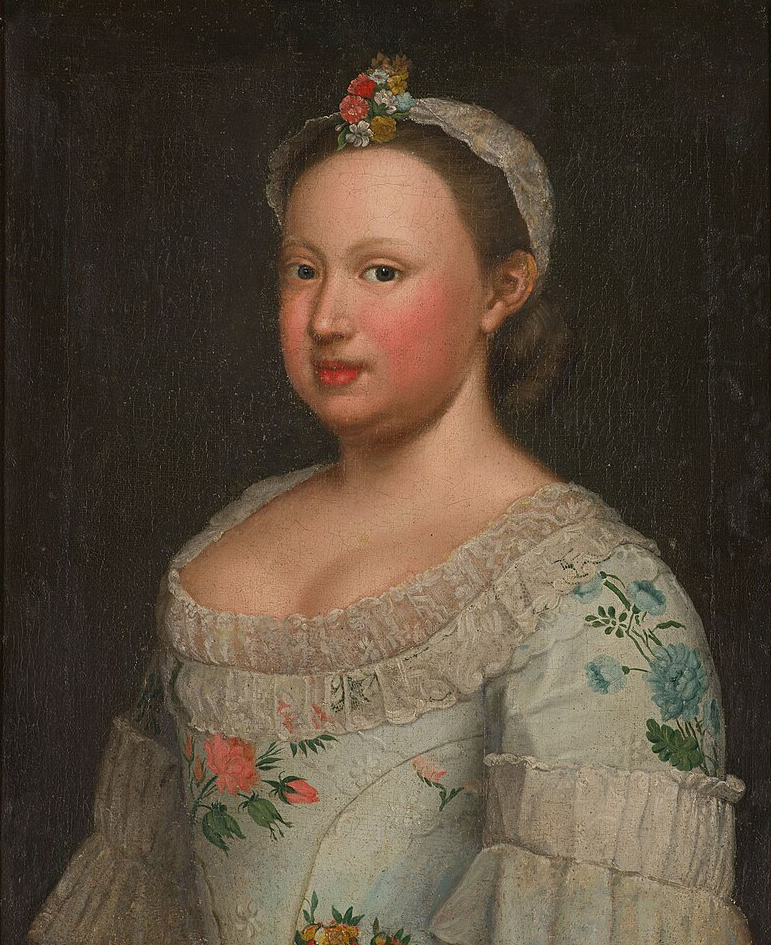
- Portrait attributed to Tethart Philipp Christian Haag, c. 1750–1774

Princess consort of Nassau-Weilburg
- Tenure: 5 March 1760 – 6 May 1787
- Born: 28 February 1743; Leeuwarden
- Died: 6 May 1787 (aged 44); Kirchheimbolanden
- Spouse: Charles Christian, Prince of Nassau-Weilburg (m. 1760)
- Issue Detail: Georg Wilhelm, Hereditary Prince of Nassau-Weilburg; Wilhelm Ludwig, Hereditary Prince of Nassau-Weilburg; Princess Maria; Louise, Princess Reuss of Greiz; Frederick William, Prince of Nassau-Weilburg; Caroline, Princess of Wied-Runkel; Prince Karl Ludwig; Prince Karl Wilhelm; Amalie, Princess of Anhalt-Bernburg-Schaumburg-Hoym; Henriette, Duchess of Württemberg; Prince Karl
- House: Orange-Nassau
- Father: William IV, Prince of Orange
- Mother: Anne, Princess Royal

Princess Carolina of Orange-Nassau (Wilhelmine Carolina; 16 February 1743 – 6 May 1787) was a Dutch regent. She was the daughter of William IV, Prince of Orange, Stadtholder of the Netherlands, and Anne, Princess Royal. She was regent of the Netherlands from 1765 until 1766 during the minority of her brother, William V.

== Life ==
Princess Carolina was born in Leeuwarden, the eldest daughter of William IV, Prince of Orange, Stadtholder of the Netherlands, and Anne, Princess Royal. In 1747, it was declared that the position of stadtholder could be inherited by females, thus making the young Princess Carolina the heir presumptive to the position of stadtholder. However, in 1748, a male heir, William, was born to her parents, thus displacing her and putting her second in line to the position. She was given a good education in music.

Princess Carolina's father died in 1751, making her three-year-old brother William V of Orange. At that point, her mother was appointed regent. Her marriage to Charles Christian of Nassau was discussed in 1758, but because of her position as the heir after her brother, her marriage was delayed by the government as well as by British monarch, who wished to discuss potential complications. In 1759, her mother died, and William V was still just ten years old. Then, Princess Carolina's paternal grandmother, Landgravine Marie Louise of Hesse-Kassel, was made regent. In 1760, Carolina finally married Charles Christian. Because of her position as the heir of her brother, the couple lived in The Hague at the Korte Voorhout and her spouse was appointed colonel in the Dutch army.

Her grandmother Marie Louise ruled until 1765, when she died. William V was now seventeen, but that was still not old enough to rule on his own, as he was legally a minor until his 18th birthday. So, Princess Carolina, being a legal adult, closest senior relative and the heir of the ruler, was therefore made regent. She ruled until 1766, when William V turned eighteen. Her rule was short and not remembered for much else than for the fact that she invited Mozart to perform in 1765.

After her brother married and started to have children, Princess Carolina, now further and further away from the succession line, left for Germany. When her spouse served as the Dutch Governor of Maastricht in 1773–1784, she often lived with him there. Outside of her short regency, she never involved much in the political affairs of The Netherlands, and was occupied with constant child births.

She died 6 May 1787 in Kirchheimbolanden, aged 44.

== Family ==
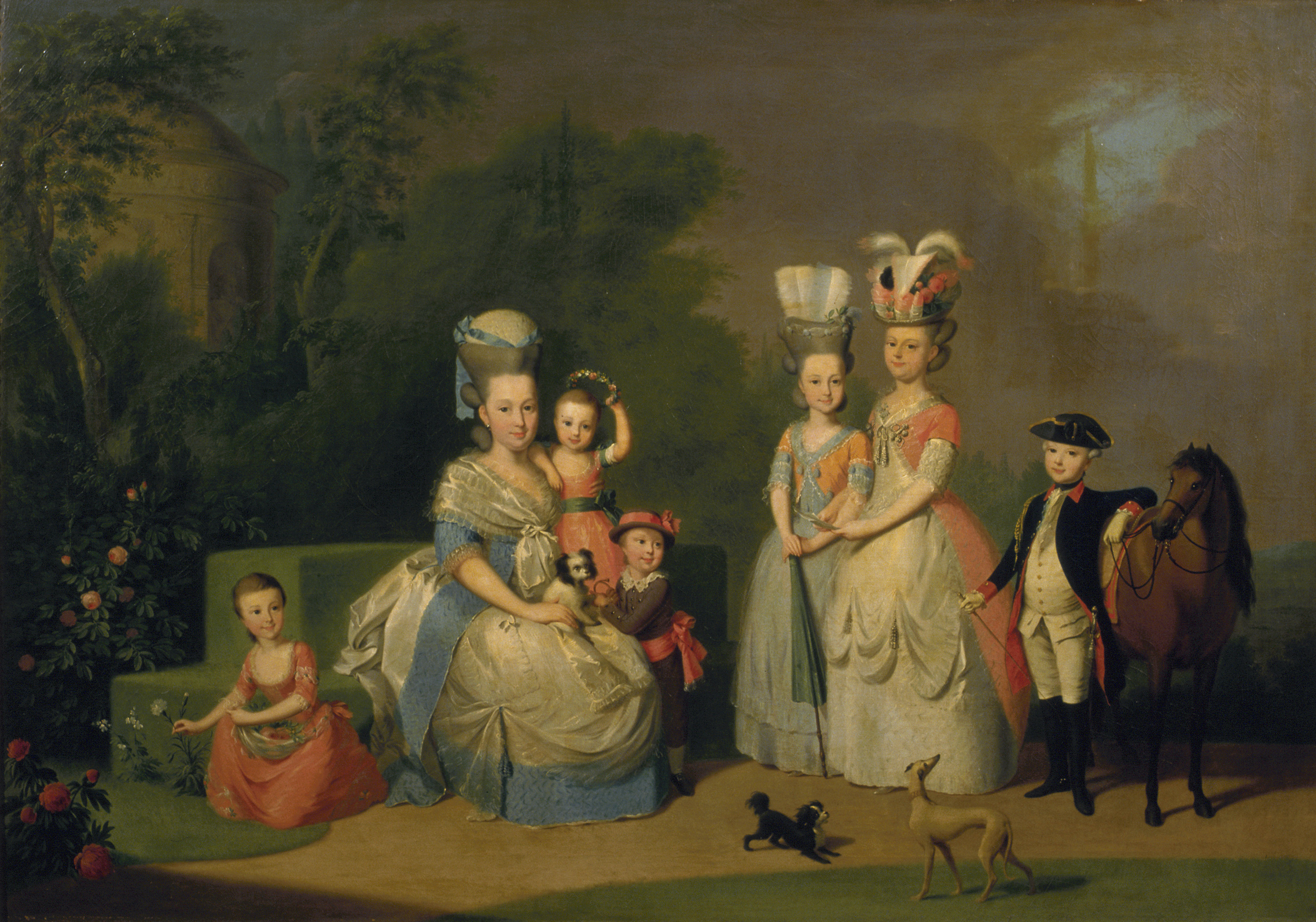
Princess Carolina of Orange-Nassau and six of her children. From left to right: Princess Caroline, Princess Carolina holding Princess Amelia, Prince Karl Wilhelm, Princess Wilhelmine Luise, Princess Maria, and Prince Frederick William. Portrait by Anton Wilhelm Tischbein.

On 5 March 1760 in The Hague, during the regency of her grandmother Dowager Princess Marie Luise, Princess Carolina married Charles Christian, Prince of Nassau-Weilburg. She was the only grandchild of George II of Great Britain who was married in his lifetime. They had fifteen children, seven of whom survived to adulthood:

- Georg Wilhelm, Hereditary Prince of Nassau-Weilburg (The Hague, 18 December 1760 – Honselaarsdijk, 27 May 1762)
- Wilhelm Ludwig, Hereditary Prince of Nassau-Weilburg (The Hague, 12 December 1761 – Kirchheim, 16 April/26 April 1770)
- Princess Maria of Nassau-Weilburg (The Hague, 5 February 1764 – Weilburg, 25 January 1802). A nun in Quedlinburg and Herford.
- Princess Luise of Nassau-Weilburg (The Hague, 28 September 1765 – Greiz, 10 October 1837), married in Kirchheim on 9 January 1786 Heinrich XIII, Prince Reuss of Greiz (Greiz, 16 February 1747 – Greiz, 29 January 1817), and had issue.
- Frederick William, Prince of Nassau-Weilburg (25 October 1768, The Hague – 9 January 1816).
- Princess Caroline of Nassau-Weilburg (Kirchheim, 14 February 1770 – Wiesbaden, 8 July 1828), married in Kirchheim on 4 September 1787 Karl Ludwig, Prince of Wied-Runkel (Dierdorf, 9 September 1763 – Dierdorf, 9 March 1824), without issue
- Prince Karl Ludwig of Nassau-Weilburg (Kirchheim, 19 July 1772 – Kirchheim, 27 July 1772)
- Prince Karl Wilhelm of Nassau-Weilburg (Kirchheim, 1 May 1775 – Weilburg, 11 May 1807), unmarried and without issue
- Princess Amelia of Nassau-Weilburg (Kirchheim, 7 August 1776 – Schaumburg, 19 February 1841), married firstly in Weilburg on 29 October 1793 Victor II, Prince of Anhalt-Bernburg-Schaumburg-Hoym, and had issue, and married secondly in Schaumburg on 15 February 1813 Friedrich, Baron von Stein-Liebenstein zu Barchfeld (14 February 1777 – 4 December 1849), and had issue
- Princess Henriette of Nassau-Weilburg (22 April 1780 – 2 January 1857). Married Duke Louis of Württemberg, second son of Friedrich II Eugen, Duke of Württemberg.
- Prince Karl of Nassau-Weilburg (1784 – shortly thereafter)
- Four nameless, stillborn children (1767, 1778, 1779, 1785)

== Ancestry ==
Ancestors of Princess Carolina of Orange-Nassau

8. Henry Casimir II, Prince of Nassau-Dietz
4. John William Friso, Prince of Orange
9. Henriette Amalie of Anhalt-Dessau
2. William IV, Prince of Orange
10. Charles I, Landgrave of Hesse-Kassel
5. Marie Louise of Hesse-Kassel
11. Maria Amalia of Courland
1. Carolina of Orange-Nassau
12. George I of Great Britain
6. George II of Great Britain
13. Sophia Dorothea of Celle
3. Anne, Princess Royal and Princess of Orange
14. John Frederick, Margrave of Brandenburg-Ansbach
7. Caroline of Ansbach
15. Princess Eleonore Erdmuthe of Saxe-Eisenach
