= Isenburg-Isenburg =

European polity

Isenburg-Isenberg
1137 - 1199
Capital; Circle; Bench	Isenburg none none
Partitioned from Niederlahngau	1137
Partitioned	1210

Isenburg-Isenburg was the name of a state of the Holy Roman Empire, based around Isenburg in modern Rhineland-Palatinate, Germany. It was created as a partition of the Niederlahngau in 1137. It partitioned into Lower Isenburg and Isenburg-Braunsberg in 1210.

Name	Reign
Rembold IV	1137 - 1162
Rembold V	1152 - 1195
Bruno I	1152 - 1199
