= Wied-Runkel =

State of the Holy Roman Empire (1698–1806)

County of Wied-Runkel Grafschaft Wied-Runkel
- 1698–1806
- Coat of arms
- Status: State of the Holy Roman Empire
- Capital: Runkel
- Government: Principality
- History
  - Partitioned from Wied: 1698
  - Raised to principality: 1791
  - Mediatised to Nassau-Weilburg: 1806
| Preceded by | Succeeded by |
| County of Wied | Nassau-Weilburg |

Coat of arms of Wied-Runkel

Wied-Runkel was a small German state with Imperial immediacy. Wied-Runkel was located around the town and castle of Runkel, located on the Lahn River. It extended from the town of Runkel to further north of Schupbach, but also held an exclave east of Villmar.

== History ==
Wied-Runkel was a partition of Wied, and was raised from a County to a Principality in 1791. Wied-Runkel was mediatised to Nassau.

== Counts of Wied-Runkel (1698–1791) ==
- 1698–1699: Johann Friederich Wilhelm von Wied-Runkel († 1698)
- 1692–1706: Maximilian Henry von Wied-Runkel († 1706), his grandson
- 1706–1762: Johann Ludwig Adolph von Wied-Runkel († 1762), his son
- 1762–1791: Christian Ludwig von Wied-Runkel († 1791), his son

== Princes of Wied-Runkel (1791–1806) ==
- 1791–1791: Christian Ludwig von Wied-Runkel († 1791)
- 1791–1806: Karl Ludwig Friedrich Alexander († 1824), his son, until 1806, demoted to the rank of State Lord, with the titles of Prince of Wied and Lord of Runkel
