= Isenburg-Braunsberg =

Isenburg-Braunsberg
1199 (1210) – 1379
Capital; Circle; Bench	Braunsberg none none
Partitioned from Isenburg-Isenburg	1199 (1210)
Renamed to Isenburg-Wied	1388

Isenburg-Braunsberg was the name of a state of the Holy Roman Empire, based around the hill Braunsberg (near Anhausen in modern Rhineland-Palatinate, Germany). It was created as a partition of Isenburg-Isenburg in 1199 (1210). In 1338 Isenburg-Braunsberg became an Imperial County. It slowly acquired territories of the County of Wied, being renamed to Isenburg-Wied in 1388.
