= Bentheim =

Bentheim may refer to:

== Places ==
- County of Bentheim, a state of the Holy Roman Empire from ca. 1228 to 1806, located in present-day Lower Saxony, Germany, roughly contiguous with the modern County of Bentheim district
- County of Bentheim (district), a district (Landkreis) in Lower Saxony, Germany
- Bentheim Castle (Burg Bentheim), an early medieval castle in Bad Bentheim, Lower Saxony, Germany
- Bad Bentheim, a town in Lower Saxony, Germany in the district of Grafschaft Bentheim known as Bentheim until 1979
- Bentheim, a community within Overisel Township, Michigan, United States

Any of several historical political entities related to the County of Bentheim:

- Bentheim-Alpen (1606–1629)
- Bentheim-Bentheim, a county eventually comprising the County of Bentheim (1277–1530, 1643–1806)
- Bentheim-Steinfurt, a county located in the region surrounding Steinfurt (1454–1806)
- Bentheim-Limburg (1606–1632)
- Bentheim-Lingen (1450–1555)
- Bentheim-Tecklenburg (1277–1557)
- Bentheim-Tecklenburg-Rheda (1606–1806)

== Animals ==
- Bentheimer Landschaf, a breed of domesticated sheep found in Germany
- Bentheim Black Pied pig, a breed of domestic pig found in Germany

== Art ==
- Bentheim Castle (Dublin), a 1653 oil on canvas painting by the Dutch painter Jacob van Ruisdael

== See also ==
- Benthem (disambiguation)
- Bentheim (noble family), the former rulers of the County of Bentheim
- View of Bentheim Castle, a 1650s oil on canvas painting by the Dutch painter Jacob van Ruisdael
