= List of states in the Holy Roman Empire (B) =

This is a list of states in the Holy Roman Empire beginning with the letter B. Some historians mark the beginning of the Empire as 800, with the coronation of Frankish king Charlemagne ("Charles the Great").

Name	Type	Imperial circle	Imperial diet	History
Baar	Landgraviate	Swab		763: Gau county Bertholdsbaar; 1070: To Sulz; 1282: Sold to Austria; 1283: To Fürstenberg; 1806: To Baden
Babenhausen	Lordship; 1803: Principality	n/a	n/a	12th Century: To Schönegg as fief of Tübingen; 1378: Sold to Rechberg-Staufeneck; 1432: To Rechberg-Babenhausen; 1507: To Rechberg-Brandenburg; 1537: To Rechberg-Kellmünz; 1539: Sold to Fugger; 1560: To Fugger-Wöllenburg; 1598: To Fugger-Babenhausen; 1803: HRE Prince; 1806: To Bavaria
Baden	Margraviate	Swab	the 4 below	c. 960; 1190: Partitioned into Baden-Baden and Baden-Hachberg; 1771: Reunited by Baden-Durlach; 1803: HRE Elector; 1806: Joined Confederation of the Rhine as a Grand Duchy
Baden-Baden	Margraviate	Swab	PR	1190: Partitioned from Baden; 1291: Partitioned into itself, Baden-Eberstein and Baden-Pforzheim; 1335: Extinct; divided between Baden-Eberstein and Baden-Pforzheim; 1348: Partitioned from Baden-Pforzheim; 1515: Partitioned into itself, Baden-Durlach and Baden-Sponheim; 1536: Partitioned into itself and Baden-Rodemachern; 1588: Extinct; to Baden-Rodemachern; 1622: Partitioned from Baden-Durlach; 1771: Extinct; to Baden-Durlach
Baden-Durlach	Margraviate	Swab	PR	1515: Partitioned from Baden-Baden; 1577: Partitioned into itself, Baden-Hachberg and Baden-Sausenburg; 1771: Renamed to Baden
Baden-Eberstein	County	Swab	SC	1291: Partitioned from Baden-Baden; 1353: Extinct; to Baden-Pforzheim
Baden-Hachberg (Baden-Hochberg)	Margraviate	Swab	PR	1190: Partitioned from Baden; 1290: Partitioned into itself and Baden-Sausenburg; 1415: Extinct; to Baden-Baden; 1482: Partitioned from Baden-Baden; 1488: Extinct; to Baden-Baden; 1577: Partitioned from Baden-Durlach; 1591: Extinct; to Baden-Durlach
Baden-Pforzheim	Margraviate	n/a	n/a	1291: Partitioned from Baden-Baden; 1315: Partitioned into itself and Baden-Baden; 1361: Extinct; to Baden-Baden
Baden-Rodemachern	Margraviate	n/a	n/a	1537: Partitioned from Baden-Baden as fief of Luxembourg; 1575: Partitioned into itself and Baden-Rodenheim; 1596: Extinct; to Baden-Durlach; 1622: Partitioned from Baden-Durlach; 1666: Extinct; to Baden-Baden
Baden-Rodenheim	Margraviate	n/a	n/a	1575: Partitioned from Baden-Rodemachern; 1620: Extinct; to Baden-Durlach
Baden-Sausenberg	Margraviate	n/a	n/a	1290: Partitioned from Baden-Hachberg; 1503: Extinct; to Baden-Baden; 1577: Partitioned from Baden-Durlach; 1604: Extinct; to Baden-Durlach
Baden-Sponheim	Margraviate	n/a	n/a	1515: Partitioned from Baden-Baden; 1533: Extinct; to Baden-Baden
Badenweiler	Lordship	n/a	n/a	1028: First mentioned, property of the Zähringen; 1147: To Saxony; 11??: To Swabia; 1268: To Freiburg; 1272: Partitioned from Freiburg; 1303: Extinct; to Strasberg; 1385: To Freiburg; 1444: To Baden-Sausenberg; 1503: Inherited by Baden-Baden
Baindt	Abbacy	Swab	SP	1240: Abbey established 1376: Imperial immediacy; HRE Princess; 1802: Secularised to Leyden; 1803: To Aspremont-Lynden; 1806: To Württemberg
Bamberg	Bishopric	Franc	EC	1007: Diocese established c. 1242: HRE Prince of the Empire; 1802: To Bavaria
Bar (Bar-le-Duc; Barrois; Mass; Meuse)	County; 1354: Duchy	Upp Rhen	PR	959: To Lorraine (Upper Lotharingia); 1033: Partitioned from Lorraine; 1301: Western half made fief of France; 1354: Duke in France; HRE Margrave; 1506: In personal union with Lorraine; 1634-1659, 1670–1697, 1702–1714: To France; 1766: To France permanently
Barby	Lordship; 1497: County	Upp Sax	WT	974: To Quedlinburg Abbey; 12th Century: To Arnstein; 1226: Partitioned from Arnstein; 1497: HRE Count; 1565: Partitioned into Barby-Barby and Barby-Mühlingen; 1651: Reunited by Barby-Mühlingen; 1659: Extinct; to Saxony
Barby-Barby	County	Upp Sax	WT	1565: Partitioned from Barby; 1651: Extinct; to Barby-Mühlingen
Barby-Mühlingen	County	Upp Sax	WT	1565: Partitioned from Barby; 1651: Renamed to Barby
Barmstedt (Barmstede)	Lordship	n/a	n/a	1149: First mentioned c. 1375: Extinct; to Holstein-Schaumburg; 1640: To Schleswig-Holstein-Gottorp; 1649: Sold to Rantzau; 1721: To Denmark
Basel	Bishopric	Upp Rhen	EC	c. 740: Diocese established 999: Acquired immediate territory 1032: HRE Prince of the Empire; 1579: Allied to the Swiss Confederation; 1792: Left-bank territories annexed to the Rauracian Republic; 1803: Right-bank territories secularised and ceded to Baden
Basel	Imperial City	n/a	n/a	1392: Acquired semi-independence; Free Imperial City; 1501: Joined the Swiss Confederation; 1648: Left the Empire as part of Switzerland
Bassenheim	Lordship; 1729: Barony			Originally to Isenburg-Braunsberg as fief of Cologne; 13th Century: To Waldbott von Waltmannshausen as fief of Cologne; 1337: To Waldbott von Bassenheim as fief of Cologne; 1729: Imperial immediacy; HRE Baron; 1794: To France; 1815: To Prussia
Battenburg	County	n/a	n/a	1101: First mentioned 1238: Partitioned into itself and Wittgenstein; 1291: Half sold to Mainz; 1296: Remainder sold to Mainz; 1310: Extinct; 1464: Sold to Hesse
Baumburg (Baumberg; Naumburg)	Raugraviate	n/a	n/a	c. 1148: Partitioned from the Wildgraviate; 1172: Partitioned into Stolzenberg and itself 1253: Partitioned into Neuenbaumburg and Altenbaumburg
Bavaria (Bayern)	Duchy; 1623: Electorate; 1806: Kingdom	Bav	EL	c. 520: First mentioned 1185: Acquired the Burgraviate of Regensburg; 1214: Acquired the County Palatine of the Rhine; 1255: Partitioned into Upper and Lower Bavaria; 1340: Reunited by Upper Bavaria; 1349: Partitioned into Brandenburg, Upper Bavaria and Lower Bavaria; 1505: Reunited by Bavaria-Munich; 1545: Bavaria reunited after many divisions 1623: HRE Elector; Acquired Upper Palatinate; 1646: Side line Bavaria-Leuchtenberg founded 1806: Joined the Confederation of the Rhine as Kingdom
Bavaria-Dachau	Duchy	Bav	PR	1467: Partitioned from Bavaria-Munich; 1501: Extinct; to Bavaria-Munich
Bavaria-Haag	Duchy	Bav	PR	1650: Created when Albert VI of Bavaria-Leuchtenberg acquired Haag; 1666: Extinct; to Bavaria
Bavaria-Ingolstadt	Duchy	n/a	n/a	1392: Partitioned from Bavaria-Landshut; 1445: Extinct; to Bavaria-Landshut
Bavaria-Landshut	Duchy	Bav	PR	1353: Partitioned from Lower Bavaria; 1392: Partitioned into Bavaria-Ingolstadt, Bavaria-Landshut and Bavaria-Munich; 1503: Extinct; succession dispute between Bavaria-Munich and Palatinate-Neuburg; 1505: Annexed to Bavaria-Munich
Bavaria-Leuchtenberg	Duchy	Bav	PR	1646: Created when Albert VI of Bavaria acquired Leuchtenberg; 1650: Exchanged with Maximilian to form Bavaria-Haag; 1680: Extinct; to Bavaria
Bavaria-Munich	Duchy	n/a	n/a	1392: Partitioned from Bavaria-Landshut; 1467: Partitioned into Bavaria-Munich and Bavaria-Dachau; 1505: Became D. of Bavaria
Bavaria-Straubing	Duchy	Bav	PR	1353: Partitioned from Lower Bavaria; 1425: Extinct; divided between Bavaria-Ingolstadt, Bavaria-Landshut and Bavaria-Munich
Beckenried	Abbacy	Swab	SP	1521: Identified in the Reichsmatrikel 1521 as an Imperial Abbey, but the house has not been identified. Assumed to be at Beckenried, Nidwalden
Beichlingen	Lordship	Upp Sax	WE	1014: First mentioned 1275: Partitioned into Beichlingen-Beichlingen and Beichlingen-Rothenburg; 1360: Reunited by Beichlingen-Beichlingen; 1519: Sold Beichlingen to Werthern; remaining territories as fief to Saxony; 1567: Extinct
Beichlingen-Beichlingen	Lordship	n/a	n/a	1275: Partitioned from Beichlingen; 1320: Partitioned into itself and Beichlingen-Sachsenfeld; 1330: Sold Heringen to Hohnstein-Klettenberg; 1360: Renamed to Beichlingen
Beichlingen-Rothenburg	Lordship	n/a	n/a	1275: Partitioned from Beichlingen; 1360: Extinct
Beichlingen-Sachsenfeld	Lordship	n/a	n/a	1275: Partitioned from Beichlingen-Beichlingen; 1345: Extinct; to Beichlingen-Beichlingen
Beilstein	Lordship; 1679: County	El Rhin	WE	1268: First mentioned; fief of Cologne; 1361: Extinct; 1363: To Winneburg as fief of Cologne; 1637: To Metternich; 1679: HRE Count; 1794: To France; 1815: To Prussia
Bentheim; Count of Bentheim, Tecklenburg, Steinfurt & Limburg, Lord of Rheda, Wevelinghoven, Hoya, Alpen, Helpenstein, Baron of Lennep, Hereditary Advocate of Cologne	Lordship; 1530: County	Low Rhen	WE	1050: First mentioned 1115: To Otto of Salm; 1146: Made fief of Utrecht; 1182: Imperial immediacy 1263: Acquired Tecklenburg; 1279: Partitioned into Tecklenburg and Bentheim; 1421: To Götterswyk who assumed the name Bentheim; 1454: Partitioned into Bentheim-Steinfurt and Bentheim-Bentheim; 1530: Reunited by Bentheim-Steinfurt; 1606: Partitioned into Bentheim-Tecklenburg-Rheda, Bentheim-Steinfurt, and appanages Bentheim-Limburg and Bentheim-Alpen
Bentheim and Steinfurt	County	Low Rhen	WE	1804: Renamed from Bentheim-Steinfurt; 1806: Bentheim to Berg, Steinfurt to Prussia
Bentheim-Alpen	County	n/a	n/a	1606: Appanage created in Bentheim-Steinfurt and Neuenahr; 1629: Extinct; apanage abolished
Bentheim-Bentheim	Lordship; 1486: HRE Count	Low Rhen	WE	1454: Partitioned from Bentheim; 1486: HRE Count; 1530: Extinct; to Bentheim-Steinfurt; 1643: Partitioned from Bentheim-Steinfurt; 1753: Mortgaged to Hanover; 1803: To Bentheim-Steinfurt; 1804: Extinct
Bentheim-Limburg	County	n/a	n/a	1606: Appanage created in Bentheim-Steinfurt and Neuenahr; 1618: Extinct; to Bentheim-Alpen
Bentheim-Steinfurt	Lordship; 1486: County	Low Rhen	WE	1454: Partitioned from Bentheim; 1486: County; 1530: Renamed to Bentheim; 1606: Partitioned from Bentheim; 1643: Partitioned into itself and Bentheim-Bentheim; 1804: Renamed to Bentheim and Steinfurt
Bentheim-Tecklenburg	Lordship	n/a	n/a	Name sometimes given to the County of Tecklenburg under the rule of the Bentheim 1277 - 1328
Bentheim-Tecklenburg-Rheda	County	Low Rhen	WE	1606: Partitioned from Bentheim-Steinfurt; 1696: Tecklenburg to Solms-Braunfels; 1807: To Berg
Bentinck; HRE Count of Bentinck and Aldenburg, Lord of the free Lordship of Knyphausen, Noble Lord of Varel	Lordship; 1732: County	n/a	n/a	1343: First mentioned 1732: HRE Count; 1738: Acquired Knyphausen and Varel; 1810: To France; 1814: To Oldenburg
Berchtesgaden; Prince, Provost and Lord of Berchtesgaden	Abbey; 1491: Provostry	Bav	EC	1108: Abbey established 1194: Imperial immediacy 1380: HRE Prince; 1491: Converted to a Provostry; 1559: Raised to Bench of Spiritual Princes; 1803: To Salzburg; 1805: To Austria; 1809: To Bavaria
Berg	County; 1380: Duchy	Low Rhen	PR	1077: First mentioned; branch of the Ezzonen; 1160: Partitioned into itself and Berg-Altena; 1218: To Limburg; 1247: Partitioned from Limburg; 1380: Duchy; 1423: To Jülich-Berg; 1521: To Jülich-Cleves-Berg; 1609: War of the Jülich Succession between Brandenburg and Palatinate-Neuburg; 1614: To Palatinate-Neuburg; 1685: To the Palatinate; 1777: To Bavaria; 1806: To Berg; 1815: To Prussia
Berg-Altena	County	n/a	n/a	1161: Partitioned from Berg; 1180: Partitioned into Altena-Isenberg and Altena-Berg
Bern (Berne)	Imperial City	n/a	n/a	1218: Free Imperial City; 1353: Joined the Swiss Confederation; 1415: Acquired Aargau; 1536: Acquired Vaud; 1648: Left the Empire as part of Switzerland
Besançon	Archbishopric	Upp Rhen	EC	4th Century: Diocese established 1184: Acquired Besançon; imperial immediacy 1288: HRE Prince of the Empire; 1493: Lost Besançon; retained seat in the Imperial Diet until 1803; 1678: To France
Besançon	Imperial City	Burg	n/a	1290: Free Imperial City; semi-independent from the Archbishopric of Besançon; 1493: Acquired complete independence 1648: To the Free County of Burgundy; 1678: To France
Biberach an der Riß	Imperial City	Swab	SW	1281/2: Free Imperial City; 1803: To Baden; 1806: To Württemberg
Biberbach	Lordship	n/a	n/a	1279: Partitioned from Pappenheim; 1514: Sold to Fugger; 1624: Extinct
Billung March (Billunger Mark)	Margraviate	n/a	n/a	928: March established 983: Conquered by the Obotrites
Bilstein in Franconia	County	n/a	n/a	c. 1130: Lordship founded by descendants of the Margraves of Zeitz; 1301: Sold to Hesse; 1306: Extinct
Blankenburg	Abbacy	Low Rhen	RP	1521: Identified in the Reichsmatrikel 1521 as an Imperial Abbey, but the house has not been identified
Blankenburg	County (1123); 1707: Principality of Imperial immediacy	Low Sax	WE	1123: First mentioned; fief of Saxony c. 1162: Partitioned into itself and Regenstein; 1180: Fief of Halberstadt; 1202: Fief of Brunswick and Lüneburg; 1344: Fief of Halberstadt; 1368: Extinct; to Regenstein-Blankenburg; 1599: To Halberstadt; 1624: To Max von Waldstein; 1629: To John II of Merode; 1631: To Brunswick-Wolfenbüttel; 1642: To Tattenbach as fief of Halberstadt; 1671: To Brunswick-Wolfenbüttel as fief of Halberstadt; 1690: To Brunswick-Wolfenbüttel-Blankenburg as fief of Halberstadt; 1707: Imperial immediacy; Bench of Counts of Westphalia; 1731: In personal union with Brunswick-Wolfenbüttel; 1805: Annexed to Brunswick-Wolfenbüttel; 1807: To Westphalia; 1814: To Brunswick
Blankenheim	Lordship; 1380: County	Low Rhen	WE	1149: Partitioned from Schleiden; 1406: Extinct; to Heinsberg by marriage 1469: To Manderscheid; 1699: Imperial immediacy 1780: To Sternberg-Manderscheid; 1794: To France; 1815: To Prussia
Blieskastel	County	n/a	n/a	1125: Partitioned into itself and Saarwerden; 1237: Extinct; to Salm; 1284: To Finstingen; 1337: To Trier; 1660: To Leyen-Adendorf; 1705: To Leyen-Hohengeroldseck; 1793: To France; 1814: To Bavaria
Blumenegg	Lordship; 1396: County	n/a	n/a	1258: First mentioned; fief of Werdenberg-Sargans; 1328: To Werdenberg-Vaduz; 1391: To Brandis; 1510: To Sulz; 1613: To Weingarten Abbey; 1803: To Nassau-Orange-Fulda; 1804: Sold to Austria
Bockstädt	County	n/a	n/a	1231: Partitioned from Stolberg; 1346: Extinct; to Hohnstein-Heldrungen
Bohemia	Duchy; 1198: Kingdom; 1356: Elector	None	EL	895: Joined the Empire as a Duchy; 1029: Acquired Moravia; 1198: HRE King; 1356: HRE Elector
Bonndorf	County	Swab	SC	Originally a property of Gurtweil, later of Küssaburg; 1250: To Lupfen; 1582: To Pappenheim; 1609: To St Blaise's Abbey; 1803: To Knights of St. John; 1805: To Württemberg; 1806: To Baden
Boos	Lordship	n/a	n/a	10th century: Originally a fief of Kempten Abbey held by the Lords of Boos; 1176: To Ottobeuren Abbey; 1551: Sold to Fugger; 1693: To Fugger-Boos; 1777: To Fugger-Babenhausen; 1806: To Bavaria
Bopfingen	Imperial City	Swab	SW	1241: Free Imperial City; 1802: To Bavaria; 1810: To Württemberg
Bouillon	County; 1456: Duchy Mediated state through the PBL	n/a	n/a	959: First mentioned 1095: Sold to the Prince-Bishopric of Liège; 1456: Prince-Bishop of Liège assumed the title "Duke of Bouillon"; 1482: To La Marck; 1521: To the Prince-Bishopric of Liège; 1552: To France, who bestowed it upon La Marck; 1559: To the Prince-Bishopric of Liège; 1676: To France; 1678: Bestowed upon La Tour d'Auvergne as protectorate 1794: To France; 1815: To Luxembourg; 1830: To Belgium
Brabant	Duchy	Burg	EC	1085: Partitioned from Lower Lotharingia; given to Henry III of Louvain and Brussels; Landgraviate; 1183: HRE Duke; 1288: Acquired Limburg; 1430: To the Duchy of Burgundy; 1477: To the Burgundian Netherlands; 1516: To the Spanish Netherlands; 1609: Northern Brabant to the Netherlands; 1795: Southern Brabant to France; 1815: All to the Netherlands; 1830: South to Belgium
Brakel	Lordship	n/a	n/a	1213: First mentioned c. 1270: Part to Asseburg, another to Everstein; 1290: Part sold to the Bishopric of Paderborn; 1316: Everstein share sold to Paderborn; 1350: Brakel share sold to the City of Brakel; 1385: Brakel family extinct 16th Century: Asseburg share to Paderborn; 1803: All to Prussia
Brakel	Imperial City	Low Rhen	RH	Originally to the Lords of Brakel; 1290: Part to the Bishopric of Paderborn; 1350: Acquired semi-independence 1803: To Prussia
Brandenburg	Margraviate; 1356: Electorate	Upp Sax	EL	1157: Originally created as the "Northern March"; 1266: Partitioned into Brandenburg-Stendal and Brandenburg-Salzwedel; margravial title shared 1317: Reunited by Brandenburg-Stendal; 1356: HRE Elector; 1415: Sold to Nuremberg; 1440: Partitioned into Brandenburg-Kulmbach, itself and Brandenburg-Ansbach; 1470: Acquired by Brandenburg-Ansbach; 1486: Partitioned into itself, Brandenburg-Ansbach and Brandenburg-Kulmbach; 1618: Acquired Prussia by marriage 1701: Also made King in Prussia
Brandenburg	Bishopric	Upp Sax	EC	949: Diocese established 983: Wendish uprising; diocese lost though bishops continued to be appointed 1165: Bishopric recreated 1569: To the Electorate of Brandenburg
Brandenburg-Ansbach	Margraviate	Franc	PR	1440: Partitioned from Brandenburg; 1486: Partitioned into itself and Brandenburg-Kulmbach; 1515: Partitioned into Brandenburg-Kulmbach and itself 1603: Partitioned into itself and Brandenburg-Bayreuth; 1791: Sold to Prussia
Brandenburg-Bayreuth	Margraviate	Franc	PR	1603: Partitioned from Brandenburg-Ansbach; 1655: Appanage Brandenburg-Kulmbach created 1726: Inherited by Brandenburg-Kulmbach; 1769: Extinct; to Brandenburg-Ansbach
Brandenburg-Kulmbach	Margraviate	Franc	see above	1440: Partitioned from Brandenburg; 1457: To Brandenburg-Ansbach; 1464: Extinct; 1486: Partitioned from Brandenburg; 1495: Extinct; to Brandenburg-Ansbach; 1515: Partitioned from Brandenburg-Ansbach; 1557: Extinct; to Brandenburg-Ansbach; 1655: Appanage created in Brandenburg-Bayreuth; 1726: Inherited Brandenburg-Bayreuth; appanage abolished
Brandenburg-Küstrin	Margraviate	Upp Sax	PR	1535: Partitioned from Brandenburg; 1571: Extinct; to Brandenburg
Brandenburg-Salzwedel	Margraviate	n/a	n/a	1266: Partitioned from Brandenburg; 1317: Extinct; to Brandenburg-Stendal
Brandenburg-Stendal	Margraviate	n/a	n/a	1266: Partitioned from Brandenburg; 1317: Renamed to Brandenburg
Brandis	Barony	Swab	SC	12th century: First mentioned 1394: Purchased many territories from Werdenberg; 1437: Purchased Maienfeld; 1509: Sold Maienfeld to the Grey Leagues; 1510: Sold remaining territories to Sulz
Brauneck	Lordship	n/a	n/a	1230: Partitioned from Hohenlohe; 1249: Partitioned into Brauneck-Brauneck and Brauneck-Haltenbergstetten
Brauneck-Brauneck	Lordship	n/a	n/a	1249: Partitioned from Brauneck; 1429: Extinct; to Burgraviate of Magdeburg of the House of Hardegg; 1448: Sold to Brandenburg-Ansbach; 1791: To Prussia; 1806: To Bavaria; 1810: To Württemberg
Brauneck-Haltenbergstetten	Lordship	n/a	n/a	1249: Partitioned from Brauneck; 1268: Partitioned into itself and Brauneck-Neuhaus; 1366: Sold to Hohenlohe-Speckfeld; 1412: To Castell and Limpurg; 1415: To Lordship of Rosenberg as fief of the Bishopric of Würzburg; 1632: To the Bishopric of Würzburg; 1636: To Hatzfeld; 1794: To the Bishopric of Würzburg; 1803: To Hohenlohe-Bartenstein-Jagstberg; 1806: To Württemberg
Brauneck-Neuhaus	Lordship	n/a	n/a	1268: Partitioned from Brauneck-Haltenbergstetten; 1320: Made fief of the Bishopric of Würzburg; 1340: Extinct; 1431: To the Teutonic Order; 1809: To Württemberg
Braunschweig; See: Brunswick	Duchy			
Breda	Lordship; 1403: Barony	Burg	WE	1080: First mentioned; imperial immediate fief of the Empire; 1327: Sold to Brabant; 1350: Sold to Wassenaar; 1403: HRE Baron; to Nassau-Dillenburg by marriage 1544: To Orange-Nassau; 1795: To France; 1815: To the Netherlands
Bregenz	County	Swab	SW	926: First mentioned 1171: To Tübingen by marriage 1180: To Montfort; 1258: To Montfort-Bregenz; 1338: To Montfort-Tettnang; 1354: To Montfort-Tettnang-Bregenz; 1379: To Elder and Younger lines of Montfort-Tettnang-Bregenz; 1451: Elder line sold to Austria; 1523: Younger line sold to Austria; 1805: To Bavaria; 1814: To Austria
Brehna	County	n/a	n/a	1034: Partitioned from the County of Eilenberg; 1106: Extinct; to Wettin; 1157: Partitioned from Wettin; 1290: Extinct; to Saxe-Wittenberg; 1356: To the Electorate of Saxony; 1658: To Saxe-Merseburg; 1738: To the Electorate of Saxony; 1815: To Prussia
Breisgau (Breisachgau)	County; Landgraviate	n/a	n/a	771: Originally a gau county 1077: To Zähringen; 1218: To Baden-Hachberg; 1306: To Baden-Hachberg-Sausenberg; 1318: To Freiburg; 1368: To Austria; 1395: To Baden-Hachberg-Sausenberg; 1398: To Austria; made part of Further Austria; 1801: To Breisgau-Modena; 1805: To Baden
Breisgau-Modena	Duchy	Aust	PR	1801: Compensation for the former Duke of Modena; 1803: Acquired the Ortenau; 1805: Divided between Baden and Württemberg
Breitenegg (Breitenegg)	HRE Lordship; 1635: County	Bav	SC	10th century: To Prunn; By 1129: To Breitenbrunn; 1229: To Laaber-Prunn; 1285: To Hirschberg; 1302: To Laaber; 1433: To Gumppenberg; 1463: To Laaber; 1465: To Pappenheim; 1473: To Wildenstein; 1534: 1/2 to Welden by marriage 1583: Extinct; other half to Haslangg and Rinderbach; 1592: Welden half sold to Palatinate-Neuburg; 1595: Haslangg and Rinderbach half sold to Bavaria; 1611: Palatinate-Neuburg half sold to Bavaria; 1624: To Tilly as fief of Bavaria; 1631: To Tilly with sovereign rights 1648: Joined Bavarian Circle; 1654: Seat in the Imperial Diet; 1744: Extinct; to Gumppenberg; 1792: Sold to Bavaria
Bremen	Archbishopric	Low Sax	EC	787: Diocese established 805: Formally constituted 848: United with Hamburg; Archbishopric; 1180: HRE Prince of the Empire; 1648: To Sweden as the Duchy of Bremen, ruled as Bremen-Verden, in personal union with the Principality of Verden
Bremen	Imperial City	Low Sax	RH	1186: Obtained autonomy within the Bremen; 1358: Joined Hanseatic League; 1366: De facto independent 1381: Acquired Bederkesa; 1653: Bederkesa to Sweden, attached Bremen-Verden; 1654: Free Imperial City; 1810: To France; 1813: Free City
Bremen-Verden	Duchy of Bremen; Principality of Verden	Low Sax	PR	1648: Bremen and Verden secularised by Sweden, de facto in personal union 1712: To Denmark; 1715: Sold to Hanover; 1807: To Westphalia; 1810: To France; 1813: To Hanover
Bretzenheim; HRE Prince of Bretzenheim and Count of Lindau	Lordship; 1664: Barony; 1774: County; 1790: Principality	Upp Rhen	SC	10th century: Fief of the Archbishopric of Cologne; Fief held by the Palatinate; Fief held by Falkenstein; 1642: To Velen; 1664: HRE Baron; 1733: Extinct; to Cologne; 1734: To Virmont; 1744: Extinct; to Cologne; 1747: To Roll zu Bernau; 1772: To Heideck; 1790: Imperial immediacy 1795: To France; 1803: Heideck granted Lindau in compensation 1815: To Prussia
Breuberg	Lordship; 1323: County	Upp Rhen	RH	1178: First mentioned; branch of Lützelbach family 1239: Acquired part of Büdingen; 1323: Extinct; divided between Wertheim, Trimberg and Eppstein; 1497: All to Wertheim; 1556: To Erbach and Stolberg-Königstein; 1574: Stolberg share to Löwenstein-Wertheim; 1806: To the Grand Duchy of Hesse (Hesse-Darmstadt)
Brixen	Bishopric	Aust	EC	580: First mentioned 1027: Acquired the Norital; 1091: Acquired the Puster Valley; 1179: HRE Prince of the Empire; 1803: To Austria; attached to the Tyrol; 1805: To Bavaria; 1814: To Austria; 1918: To Italy
Broich	Lordship	n/a	n/a	1093: 1st mentioned 11th century: Made fief of Berg; 13th century: Asserted imperial immediacy 1372: Extinct; to Limburg-Styrum; 1376: Made fief of Berg; 1439: Fief to Limburg-Broich; 1505: Fief to Dhaun-Falkenstein; 1682: Fief to Leiningen-Dagsburg
Bruchhausen	County	n/a	n/a	1199: Partitioned from Wildeshausen; 1234: Partitioned into Neubruchhausen and Altbruchhausen
Bruchsal and Odenheim	Abbacy; 1503: Provostry	Upp Rhen	RP	1110-8: Established at Odenheim; 1161: Imperial immediacy 1496: HRE Lord; 1503: Abbey converted to secular Provostry; 1507: Relocated to Bruchsal; 1803: To Baden
Brunnen	Abbacy		SP	1521: Identified in the Reichsmatrikel 1521 as an Imperial Abbey, identified as Mariabrunn Abbey in Carinthia
Brunswick and Lüneburg	Duchy	n/a	n/a	1235: Descendants of Henry the Lion, Duke of Saxony confirmed with territory around Brunswick and Lüneburg; 1269: Partitioned into Brunswick-Wolfenbüttel and Lüneburg
Brunswick-Calenberg	Duchy	Low Sax	PR	1432: Partitioned from Brunswick-Wolfenbüttel; 1463: Inherited Brunswick-Göttingen; renamed to Brunswick-Calenberg-Göttingen; 1634: Partitioned from Brunswick-Wolfenbüttel; 1692: Made Electorate of Hanover
Brunswick-Calenberg-Göttingen	Duchy	Low Sax	PR	1463: Renamed from Brunswick-Calenberg; 1503: Partitioned into Brunswick-Wolfenbüttel and itself 1584: Extinct; to Brunswick-Wolfenbüttel
Brunswick-Dannenberg	Duchy	n/a	n/a	1569: Appanage created in Brunswick-Lüneburg; 1598: Appanage Brunswick-Hitzacker created 1636: Extinct; to Brunswick-Wolfenbüttel
Brunswick-Göttingen	Duchy	n/a	n/a	1291: Partitioned from Brunswick-Wolfenbüttel; 1344: Partitioned into Brunswick-Wolfenbüttel and itself 1463: Extinct; to Brunswick-Calenberg
Brunswick-Grubenhagen	Duchy	Low Sax	PR	1291: Partitioned from Brunswick-Wolfenbüttel; 1361: Partitioned into Brunswick-Grubenhagen-Salzderhelden and Brunswick-Grubenhagen-Osterode; 1452: Reunited by Salzderhelden line 1479: Partitioned into Brunswick-Grubenhagen-Heldenberg and Brunswick-Grubenhagen-Osterode; 1526: Reunited by Osterode line 1596: Extinct; to Brunswick-Wolfenbüttel
Brunswick-Grubenhagen-Heldenberg	Duchy	Low Sax	PR	1479: Partitioned from Brunswick-Grubenhagen; 1526: Extinct; to Brunswick-Grubenhagen-Osterode
Brunswick-Grubenhagen-Osterode	Duchy	Low Sax	PR	1361: Partitioned from Brunswick-Grubenhagen; 1452: Extinct; to Brunswick-Grubenhagen-Salzderhelden; 1479: Partitioned from Brunswick-Grubenhagen; 1526: Renamed to Brunswick-Grubenhagen
Brunswick-Grubenhagen-Salzderhelden	Duchy	n/a	n/a	1361: Partitioned from Brunswick-Grubenhagen; 1452: Renamed to Brunswick-Grubenhagen
Brunswick-Hitzacker	Duchy	n/a	n/a	1598: Appanage created in Brunswick-Dannenberg; 1634: Inherited Brunswick-Wolfenbüttel; appanage abolished
Brunswick-Lüneburg	Duchy	Low Sax	PR	1388: Formed after defeating the Electorate of Saxony in the War of the Lüneburg Succession; 1527: Partitioned into Brunswick-Lüneburg-Harburg and itself 1539: Partitioned into itself and Brunswick-Lüneburg-Gifhorn; 1569: Appanage Brunswick-Dannenberg created 1705: Extinct; to Electorate of Hanover
Brunswick-Lüneburg-Gifhorn	Duchy	Low Sax	PR	1539: Partitioned from Brunswick-Lüneburg; 1642: Extinct; to Brunswick-Lüneburg
Brunswick-Lüneburg-Harburg	Duchy	Low Sax	PR	1527: Partitioned from Brunswick-Lüneburg; 1642: Extinct; divided between Brunswick-Celle and Brunswick-Wolfenbüttel
Brunswick-Wolfenbüttel	Duchy	Low Sax	PR	1269: Partitioned from Brunswick and Lüneburg; 1291: Partitioned into Brunswick-Grubenhagen, Brunswick-Göttingen and itself 1292: Extinct; to Brunswick-Göttingen; 1344: Partitioned from Brunswick-Göttingen; 1432: Partitioned into Brunswick-Calenberg and itself 1482: Extinct; to Brunswick-Calenberg-Göttingen; 1503: Partitioned from Brunswick-Calenberg-Göttingen; 1634: Partitioned into itself and Brunswick-Calenberg; 1667: Appanages Brunswick-Wolfenbüttel-Bevern and Brunswick-Wolfenbüttel-Calvörde created 1690: Partitioned into itself and Brunswick-Wolfenbüttel-Blankenburg; 1806: Inherited by appanage Brunswick-Wolfenbüttel-Oels; 1814: Renamed to Duchy of Brunswick
Brunswick-Wolfenbüttel-Bevern	Duchy	n/a	n/a	1667: Appanage created in Brunswick-Wolfenbüttel; 1735: Inherited Brunswick-Wolfenbüttel; appanage passed to Duke's younger brother 1809: Extinct; appanage abolished
Brunswick-Wolfenbüttel-Blankenburg	Duchy	Low Rhen	WE	1690: Partitioned from Brunswick-Wolfenbüttel; 1731: Inherited and renamed to Brunswick-Wolfenbüttel
Brunswick-Wolfenbüttel-Calvörde	Duchy	n/a	n/a	1667: Appanage created in Brunswick-Wolfenbüttel; 1685: Inherited Brunswick-Wolfenbüttel; appanage abolished
Brunswick-Wolfenbüttel-Oels	Duchy	n/a	n/a	1792: Appanage created for Frederick Augustus, husband of the late Duchess of Württemberg-Oels; 1806: Inherited Brunswick-Wolfenbüttel; appanage abolished
Buchau	Abbacy	Swab	RP; SC	c. 770: Abbey established 1347: Imperial immediacy; HRE Princess of the Empire; 1415: Converted to a secular nunnery 1625: Acquired Strassberg; 1803: To Thurn und Taxis; 1806: To Württemberg; Strassberg to Hohenzollern-Sigmaringen
Buchau	Imperial City	Swab	SW	c. 1250: Free Imperial City; 1803: To Thurn und Taxis; 1806: To Württemberg
Buchhorn (Friedrichshafen)	Imperial City	Swab	SW	1275: Free Imperial City; 1803: To Württemberg
Burgau	Lordship; 1212: Margraviate	n/a	n/a	1147: First mentioned 1212: HRE Margrave; 1301: Extinct; to Austria; 1304: Invested in sons of Albert I Later made part of Further Austria; 1595: To Charles of Austria; 1618: Extinct; to Austria; 1805: To Bavaria
Burgundy (Franche-Comté)	County; 1127: Free County; 1190: Archcounty; 1169: Also County Palatine	Burg	n/a	982: County created 1127: HRE Free County; 1190: HRE Archcount; 1405: To the Duchy of Burgundy; 1477: To France; 1493: To the Burgundian Netherlands; 1516: To the Spanish Netherlands; 1678: To France
Burgundy	Landgraviate	n/a	n/a	1218: Created after the extinction of Zähringen; to Buchegg; 1252: First mentioned 1313: To Habsburg-Kyburg; 1406-8: To Bern
Bürresheim (Burresheim)	Lordship	n/a	n/a	10th century 1157: Half to Cologne; 1189: Other half to Trier, fief held by Schöneck; 1473: Schöneck half sold to Breitbach; 1477: Part of Cologne half sold to Breitbach; 1659: All to Breitbach, who renamed to "Breitbach-Bürresheim" as fief of the Archbishoprics; 1691: HRE Baron; 1796: Extinct; to France though rights passed to Renesse
Burtscheid	Abbacy	Low Rhen	RP	997: Abbey established 1018: Obtained surrounding territory 1138: Imperial immediacy; HRE Prince of the Empire; 1220: Converted to a nunnery 1794: To France; 1802: Abbey dissolved 1815: To Prussia
Buxheim	Abbacy	n/a	SP	c. 1100: Charterhouse established 1548: Imperial immediacy 1802: To Ostein; 1806: To Bavaria; 1812: Charterhouse dissolved
