= Lists of political office-holders in Germany =

These are lists of political office-holders in Germany.

== Heads of state ==
- Presidents of Germany
- List of German presidents since 1919
- List of German monarchs
  - List of state leaders in the 19th century (1851–1900)
  - List of state leaders in the 20th century (1901–1950)
  - List of German monarchs in 1918

== Heads of government ==
- Chancellors of Germany
- Deputy and Vice-Chancellors

== Ministers ==
- Foreign ministers
- Interior ministers
- Finance ministers
- Justice ministers
- Postal ministers
- Colonial ministers
- Naval ministers
- Defence ministers
- Economics ministers
- Agriculture ministers
- Labour ministers
- Transportation ministers
- Reconstruction ministers
- Occupied Territories ministers

== Heads of former states ==
=== Federal Republic of Germany ===
- Ministers of the Federal Republic of Germany

=== German Democratic Republic ===
- Leadership of East Germany

=== Holy Roman Empire ===
- List of Holy Roman Emperors

=== Prussia ===
- Kings of Prussia
- Prime Ministers of Prussia
- Deputy Prime Ministers of Prussia
- Foreign Ministers of Prussia
- Interior Ministers of Prussia
- War Ministers of Prussia

=== Princely states ===
- Kingdom of Hanover and Province of Hanover
- Rulers of Bavaria
- Counts Palatine of the Rhine and Electors Palatine
- Rulers of Württemberg
- Rulers of Saxony
- Rulers of Baden
- Rulers of Hesse
- Counts, Princes of Hohenzollern-Sigmaringen
- Rulers of Mecklenburg
- Counts, Princes of Reuss
- Margrave of Ansbach
- Counts, Princes, and Dukes of Arenberg
- Counts and dukes of Bar
- Margrave of Bayreuth
- Counts of Bentheim
- Counts of Bentheim-Alpen
- Counts of Bentheim-Bentheim
- Counts of Bentheim-Limburg
- Counts of Bentheim-Lingen
- Counts of Bentheim-Steinfurt
- Counts of Bentheim-Tecklenburg
- Counts of Bentheim-Tecklenburg-Rheda
- Electors of Brandenburg, see: List of rulers of Brandenburg and Hohenzollern
- Dukes of Brunswick-Lüneburg
- Counts of Castell
- Counts of Castell-Castell
- Counts of Castell-Rüdenhausen
- Counts of Celje
- Dukes of Cleves, see Duchy of Cleves
- Counts and Princes of East Frisia
- Counts of Fürstenberg
- Counts of Fürstenberg-Baar
- Counts of Fürstenberg-Blumberg
- Counts of Fürstenberg-Donaueschingen
- Counts of Fürstenberg-Fürstenberg
- Princes of Fürstenberg-Fürstenberg
- Counts of Fürstenberg-Geisingen
- Counts of Fürstenberg-Heiligenberg
- Princes of Fürstenberg-Heiligenberg
- Counts of Fürstenberg-Möhringen
- Counts of Fürstenberg-Messkirch
- Princes of Fürstenberg-Messkirch
- Princes of Fürstenberg-Pürglitz
- Counts of Fürstenberg-Stühlingen
- Counts of Fürstenberg-Taikowitz
- Counts of Fürstenberg-Weitra
- Counts of Fürstenberg-Wolfach
- Counts, Princes of Hohenzollern-Hechingen
- Counts, Princes of Hohenzollern-Sigmaringen
- Dukes of Holstein-Gottorp
- Princes of Klingenberg
- Dukes of Krumau
- Prince of Liechtenstein
- Lords, Counts and Princes of Lippe
- Dukes, Grand Dukes of Mecklenburg-Schwerin
- Dukes, Grand Dukes of Mecklenburg-Strelitz
- List of Margraves of Meißen
- Counts of Nassau
- Burgrave of Nuremberg
- Rulers of Oldenburg
- Counts of Ortenburg-Neuortenburg
- Counts of Öttingen-Öttingen
- Dukes of Pomerania
- Palatinate-Simmern
- Counts Palatine of Zweibrücken
- Dukes and Kings of Prussia, see List of rulers of Prussia
- Counts, Princes of Reuss
- Counts of Salm
- Counts of Salm-Horstmar
- Wildgraves, Rhinegraves, Princes of Salm-Kyrburg
- Counts of Salm-Reifferscheid-Dyck
- Counts of Salm-Reifferscheid-Hainsbach
- Counts, Princes of Salm-Reifferscheid-Krautheim
- Counts of Salm-Reifferscheid-Raitz
- Counts, Princes of Salm-Salm
- Counts of Sayn-Berleburg
- Counts of Sayn-Wittgenstein-Hohnstein
- Dukes of Saxe-Coburg and Gotha
- List of rulers of Schleswig-Holstein
- Counts of Schönborn-Wiesentheid
- Counts of Solms-Braunfels
- Counts of Solms-Hohensolms-Lich
- Counts of Solms-Laubach
- Counts of Solms-Rödelheim-Assenheim
- Counts of Solms-Wildenfels
- Counts of Stadion-Thannhausen
- Counts of Stadion-Warthausen
- Counts of Stolberg-Stolberg
- Counts of Stolberg-Wernigerode
- Dukes of Swabia
- Princes of Thurn und Taxis
- Rulers of Thuringia
- Counts of Toggenburg
- Counts of Veldenz
- Counts of Waldburg-Waldsee
- Counts of Waldburg-Wurzach
- Counts of Waldburg-Zeil
- Princes of Waldeck

=== Barbarian States ===
- Hasdingii rulers, see Vandal
- Visigothic rulers, see Visigoth
- Suevi rulers, see Suevi or Kingdom of Galicia
- Ostrogothic rulers, see Ostrogoth

== State office-holders ==
- German field marshals

== Heads of subdivisions ==
- Minister-presidents of Baden-Württemberg
- Minister-presidents of Bavaria
- Mayors of Berlin
- Minister-presidents of Brandenburg
- Mayors of Bremen
- Mayors of Hamburg
- Minister-presidents of Hesse
- Minister-presidents of Mecklenburg-Vorpommern
- Minister-presidents of Lower Saxony
- Minister-presidents of North Rhine-Westphalia
- Minister-presidents of Rhineland-Palatinate
- Minister-presidents of Saarland
- Minister-presidents of Saxony
- Minister-presidents of Saxony-Anhalt
- Minister-presidents of Schleswig-Holstein
- Minister-presidents of Thuringia

== See also ==
- Lists of office-holders
