= Bentheim (noble family) =

German noble family

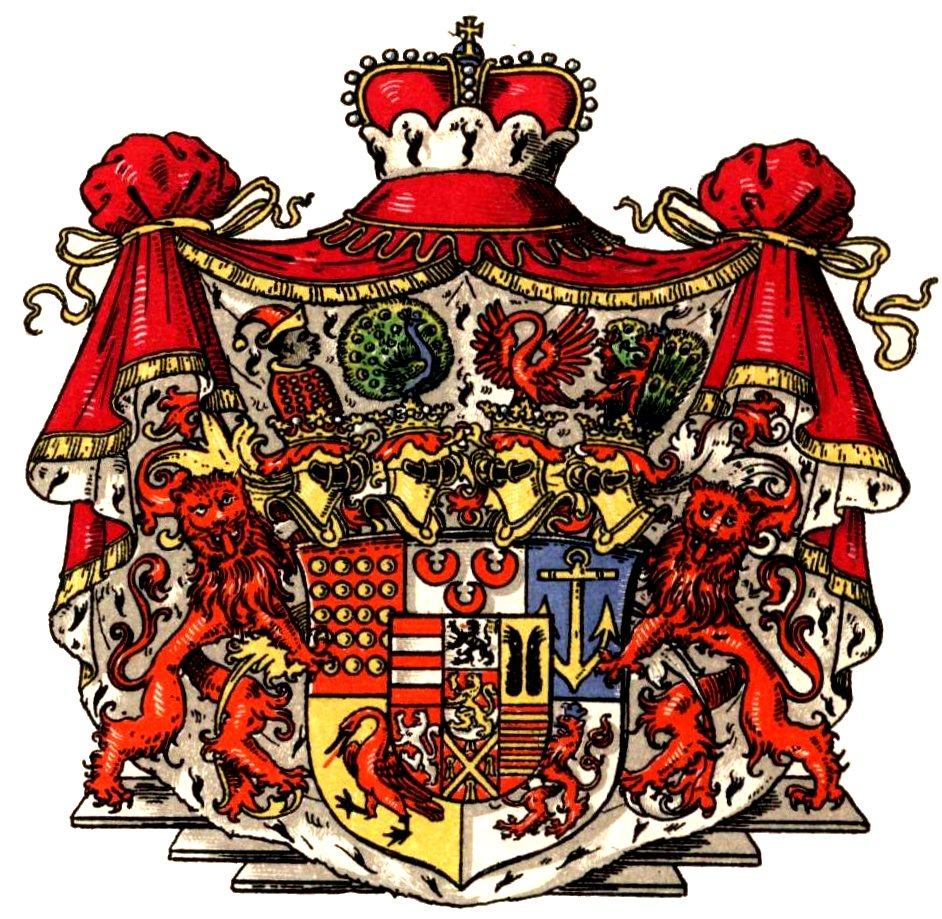
Princes of Bentheim-Steinfurt coat of arms

The House of Bentheim is one of the oldest extant German noble families. They are a mediatized family, formerly being rulers of their own territories directly under the Holy Roman Emperor. They belong to both the ancient nobility (Uradel) and the high nobility (Hochadel). Today, there are two main lines of the family: the princes of Bentheim-Steinfurt and the princes of Bentheim-Tecklenburg. There is also a third, non-princely line of the family, the counts of Bentheim-Tecklenburg-Rheda.

== History ==
The earliest known member of the family is Everwin von Götterswick/Güterswyk, c. 1200, supposedly the descendant of a knight named Godert who had settled on the lower Rhine near Wesel.

In 1421, Everwin's descenant Everwin (1397–1454) inherited the County of Bentheim from his mother's family. In 1451, the Lordship of Steinfurt was also added to the family, through marriage. In 1486, Holy Roman Emperor Frederick III formally recognized Bentheim as an immediate Imperial County; it belonged to the Westphalian College of Counts. The county was partitioned numerous times over the following centuries, notably in 1609, following the death of Count Arnold von Bentheim-Steinfurt.

The Bentheims lost their status as independent rulers in 1806, following the dissolution of the Holy Roman Empire, when they were mediatized by the Grand Dutchy of Berg. At the Congress of Vienna (1814–1815), the counties of Bentheim-Steinfurt and Bentheim-Tecklenburg were assigned to the kingdoms of Hanover and Prussia, respectively. In 1817, King Frederick William III granted both branches the rank of prince; from 1854, both branches had hereditary seats in the Prussian House of Lords.

Bentheim coat of arms

Both princely branches still own numerous historical family properties, including Bentheim Castle, many of which are open to the public.

== Members ==
List of princes of Bentheim-Steinfurt

List of princes of Bentheim-Tecklenburg

List of counts of Bentheim-Tecklenburg-Rheda
