= Benthem =

Benthem may refer to:

- The original Low German and Dutch name for the castle, town or county of Bentheim.
- The surname Van Benthem
- Benthem v Netherlands, a legal case argued before the European Court of Human Rights.

For the English jurist and philosopher, see Jeremy Bentham.
