= Van Benthem =

Van Benthem is a Dutch surname meaning "from Bentheim". It can refer to:

- Evert van Benthem (b. 1958), Dutch speedskater, twice winner of the Elfstedentocht
- Jean Van Benthem (fl. 1908), Belgian cyclist
- Johan van Benthem (b. 1949), Dutch professor of logic
- Johannes Bob van Benthem (1921–2006), Dutch lawyer, first president of the European Patent Office
- Merle van Benthem (b. 1992), Dutch off-road bicycle racer
- Roland van Benthem (b. 1968), Dutch politician

== See also ==
- Benthem (disambiguation)
