= Death messenger =

Person who reports news of a death

Death messengers, in former times, were those who were dispatched to spread the news that an inhabitant of their city or village had died. They were to wear unadorned black and go door to door with the message, "You are asked to attend the funeral of the departed __________ at (time, date, and place)." This was all they were allowed to say, and were to move on to the next house immediately after uttering the announcement. This tradition persisted in some areas to as late as the mid-19th century.

== See also ==
- Casualty notification
- Death notification
