= Beichlingen =

- Ortsteil of Kölleda
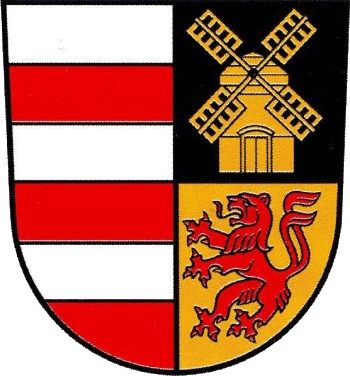
- Coat of arms
- Interactive map of Beichlingen
- Location within Germany Location within Thuringia
- Coordinates: 51°13′N 11°15′E
- Country: Germany
- State: Thuringia
- District: Sömmerda
- Town: Kölleda

Area
  - Total: 19.12 km^{2} (7.38 sq mi)
- Elevation: 200 m (660 ft)

Population (2023)
  - Total: 502
  - Density: 26.3/km^{2} (68.0/sq mi)
- Time zone: UTC+01:00 (CET)
  - Summer (DST): UTC+02:00 (CEST)
- Postal codes: 99625, 06577
- Dialling codes: 03635

Beichlingen (German pronunciation: [ˈbaɪçlɪŋən]) is a village and a former municipality in the Sömmerda district of Thuringia, Germany. Since 1 January 2019, it is part of the town Kölleda. It lies five kilometers north of Kölleda in the Thuringian Basin on the southern edge of the Schmücke. It has a population of 502 as of 2023.

== History ==
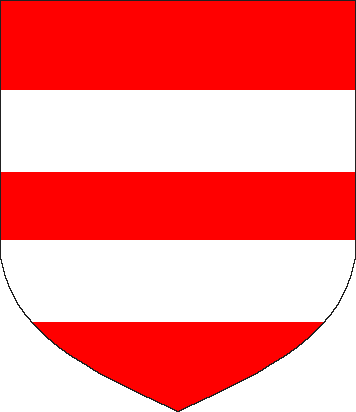
Coat of arms of the Lords and Counts of Beichlingen

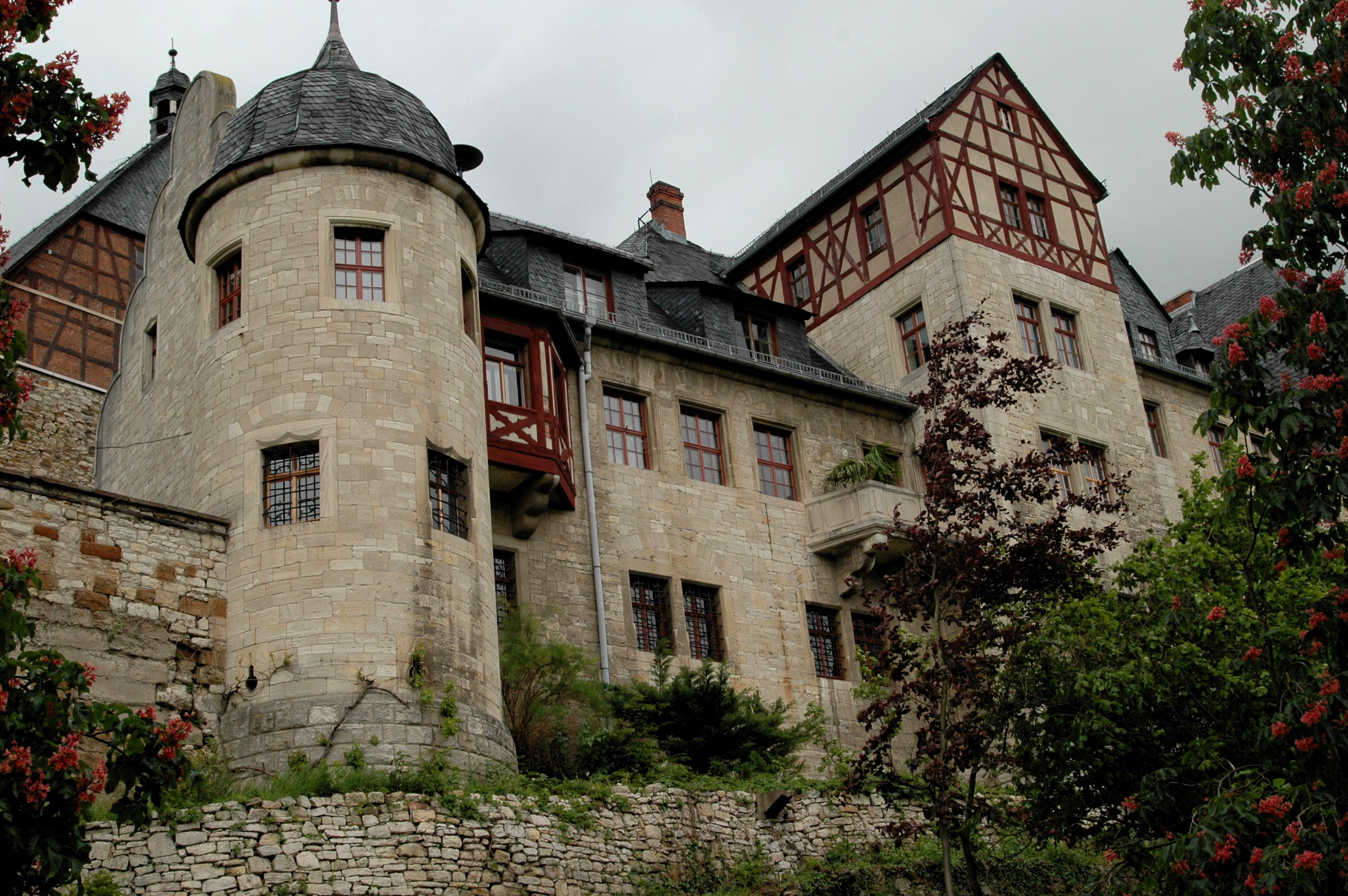
Palace Beichlingen

The village was first officially documented in 1014 and was cited as the headquarters of the countly family of Beichlingen with the same name, and later the count of Werthern-Beichlingen.

Beichlingen was affected by European witch hunts from 1618 to 1690, in which one woman and two men were put under arrest.

In April 1945 the village was occupied by the US Army, and later taken over by the Red Army. The Red Army stayed in the Oberweimarische Courtyard belonging to the manor in the area, which was later referred to as "Russenhof" (Russiancourtyard) or "Roter Hof" (Red Courtyard).

In 2017 the Municipal Council voted in favor of the integration of Beichlingen into the city of Kölleda.

== Population ==
Population census
Year	Pop.	±% p.a.
1995	664	—
2000	611	−1.65%
2005	596	−0.50%
2010	562	−1.17%
2015	510	−1.92%
2018	490	−1.32%
2023	502	+0.49%

=== 2022 census ===
As of the 2022 (2022-05-15) census, Beichlingen had a population of 340, making the population density 716,7/km². 11.76% of the residents were 17 years of age or younger, 52.94% of the residents were 18-64 and 35.29% of the residents were 65 years of age or older.
