= County of Bentheim =

State of the Holy Roman Empire

County of Bentheim Grafschaft Bentheim
- c. 1050–1806
- Coat of arms

- The County of Bentheim around 1350
- Status: County
- Capital: Bad Bentheim
- Common languages: West Low German
- Historical era: Middle Ages, Early modern period
  - Bentheim Castle mentioned: c. 1050
  - Partitioned into Bentheim-Bentheim and Bentheim-Tecklenburg: 1277
  - Split off Bentheim-Steinfurt: 1454
  - Split off B.-Tecklenburg-Rheda: 1606
  - Annexed by Prussia and Berg: 1806
| Preceded by | Succeeded by |
| Duchy of Saxony | Kingdom of Prussia; Grand Duchy of Berg |

The County of Bentheim (German: Grafschaft Bentheim, Low German Benthem) was a state of the Holy Roman Empire, located in the south-west corner of today's Lower Saxony, Germany. The county's borders corresponded largely to those of the modern administrative district (Landkreis) of Grafschaft Bentheim.

Geographically, Bentheim is composed largely of fenland, and early settlement was concentrated along the banks of the rivers which pass through the county. Deposits of Bentheim sandstone formed the basis of a profitable export trade to other parts of present-day Germany and the Netherlands.

== History ==
Around 500–600 CE Germanic tribes settled in the area. The Saxon tribes lost their independence in 804 CE after the Franks won the Saxon Wars. Between 800 and 850 Emperor Charlemagne had them forced to convert to Christianity. The scholten system was introduced, and Emlichheim, Uelsen, Veldhausen, and Nordhorn become church and court districts.

The county of Bentheim was in existence by c. 1050 AD, although little is known of its history before 1115. In that year, the county passed to Count Otto, of the House of Salm. His heir and daughter, Countess Sophia, married Dirk VI, Count of Holland, and they co-ruled the county until Dirk's death in 1157. Sophia died in 1176, and the title of count passed to her son Otto I. In 1263, Bentheim annexed the County of Tecklenburg, and over time various branches of the counts of Bentheim would annex and purchase various territories in Rheda, Steinfurt, and the Netherlands. In 1277, the County of Bentheim was partitioned into Bentheim-Bentheim (containing the County of Bentheim) and Bentheim-Tecklenburg (containing the County of Tecklenburg).

The first County of Bentheim-Bentheim endured until 1530, when its line of counts had become extinct and Bentheim was granted to Arnold II of Bentheim-Steinfurt. In 1544, Arnold officially converted to Lutheranism, beginning a slow process of introducing the Reformation in Bentheim and other territories he ruled. Protestant preachers were introduced into Bentheim during the autumn of 1587. The following year Bentheim officially gained a new Church constitution, which was later introduced in Tecklenburg (1589) and Steinfurt (1591). In 1613, Count Arnold Jobst of Bentheim-Steinfurt created the Higher Church Council to help administer the spiritual matters of Bentheim, as well as establishing the Reformed Church of Bentheim in all three of the counties.

When Arnold Jobst died in 1643, the County of Bentheim-Steinfurt was partitioned into Bentheim-Steinfurt and Bentheim-Bentheim, the latter comprising the County of Bentheim. In 1753, the County of Bentheim was seized by the elector of Hanover. "In 1753, trouble within made them (the Counts of Bentheim) take out a mortgage to the King of Hanover and England."

For almost 700 years prior to this, Grafschaft Bentheim was independently ruled by the Counts of Bentheim and that they might have continued thus had it not been for the circumstances of 1753.

At the end of the Holy Roman Empire, the Count of Bentheim-Steinfurt and the Count of Bentheim-Bentheim each had one voice in the Assembly of the Imperial Circle of the Lower Rhine-Westphalia. As members of the College of the Counts of Westphalia, they were represented in the Council of Princes of the Imperial Diet (Reichstag). These representation made the House of Bentheim a member of the German High Nobility.

In 1803 the Bentheim-Bentheim branch became extinct. In 1804 the Count of Bentheim-Steinfurt made a bargain with the Government of France. He paid a fraction of the old debt of the Count of Bentheim-Bentheim to Hanover and obtained the possession of the County of Bentheim despite the protest of the Elector of Hanover.

In July 1806, by the Act of the Confederation of the Rhine, the Grand Duchy of Berg mediatised the Imperial immediate Counties of Steinfurt and Bentheim that belonged to the Count of Bentheim-Steinfurt. In 1808, the Grand Duchy of Berg mediatised the Lordship of Rheda and the County of Hohenlimburg, the independent possessions of the Count of Bentheim-Tecklenburg.

Bentheim was annexed by the French Empire in 1810 along with the Kingdom of Holland and much of northwest Germany, becoming part of the Department of Lippe.

The Congress of Vienna (1814-1815) put Steinfurt and Rheda under overlordship of Prussia, and Bentheim under overlordship of Hanover. In 1817, the King of Prussia granted the Counts of Bentheim-Steinfurt and Bentheim-Tecklenburg the title of Prince. Since 1854, the Princes of Bentheim-Steinfurt and Bentheim-Tecklenburg were hereditary members of the House of Lords of Prussia.

Today, the still extant branches of the House of Bentheim are the princes of Bentheim-Steinfurt with their seat at Steinfurt Castle (also still owners of the ancestral seat Burg Bentheim) and the princes of Bentheim-Tecklenburg-Rheda with their seats at Rheda Castle and Hohenlimburg Castle, also owners of the former monasteries of Herzebrock and Clarholz.

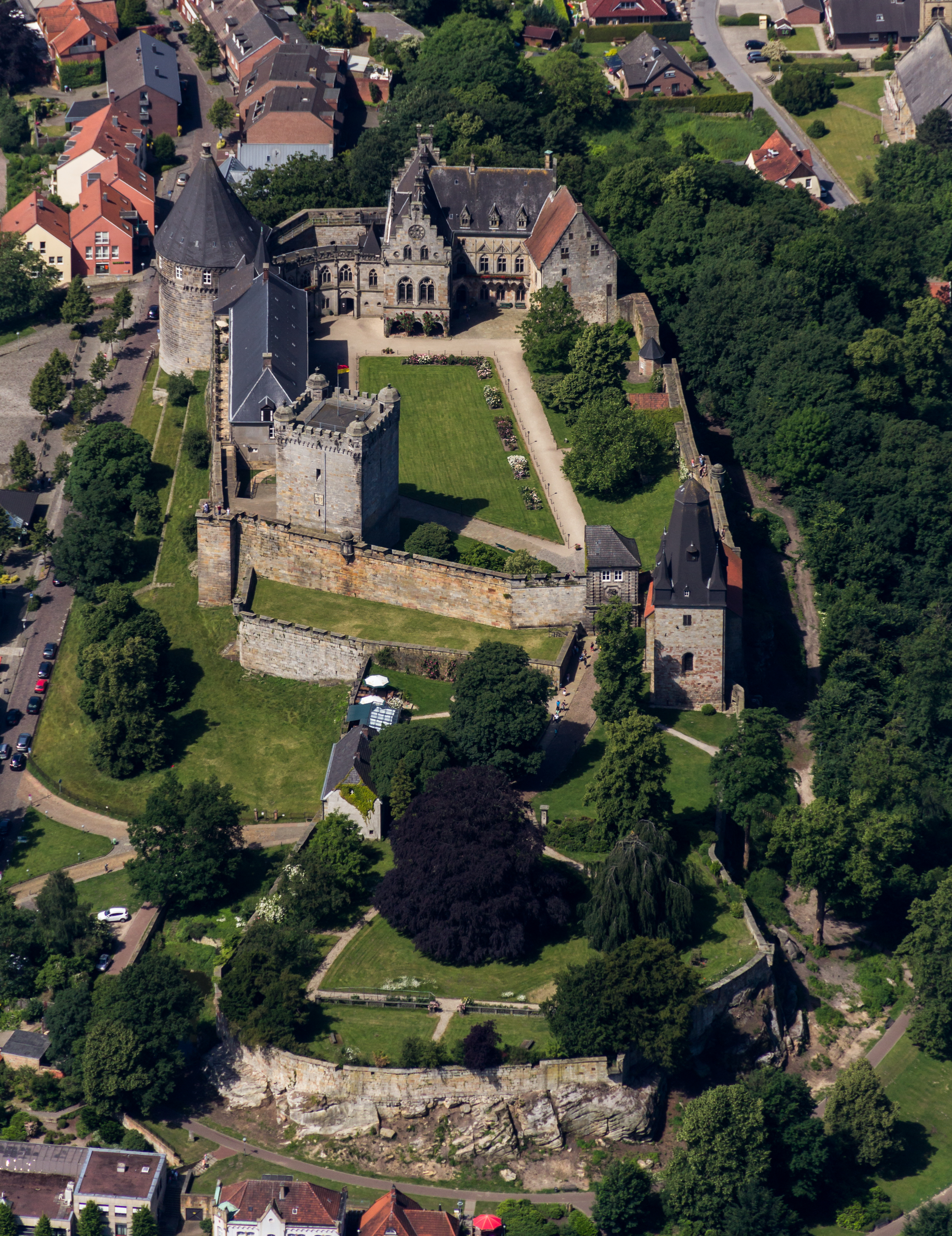
Bentheim Castle

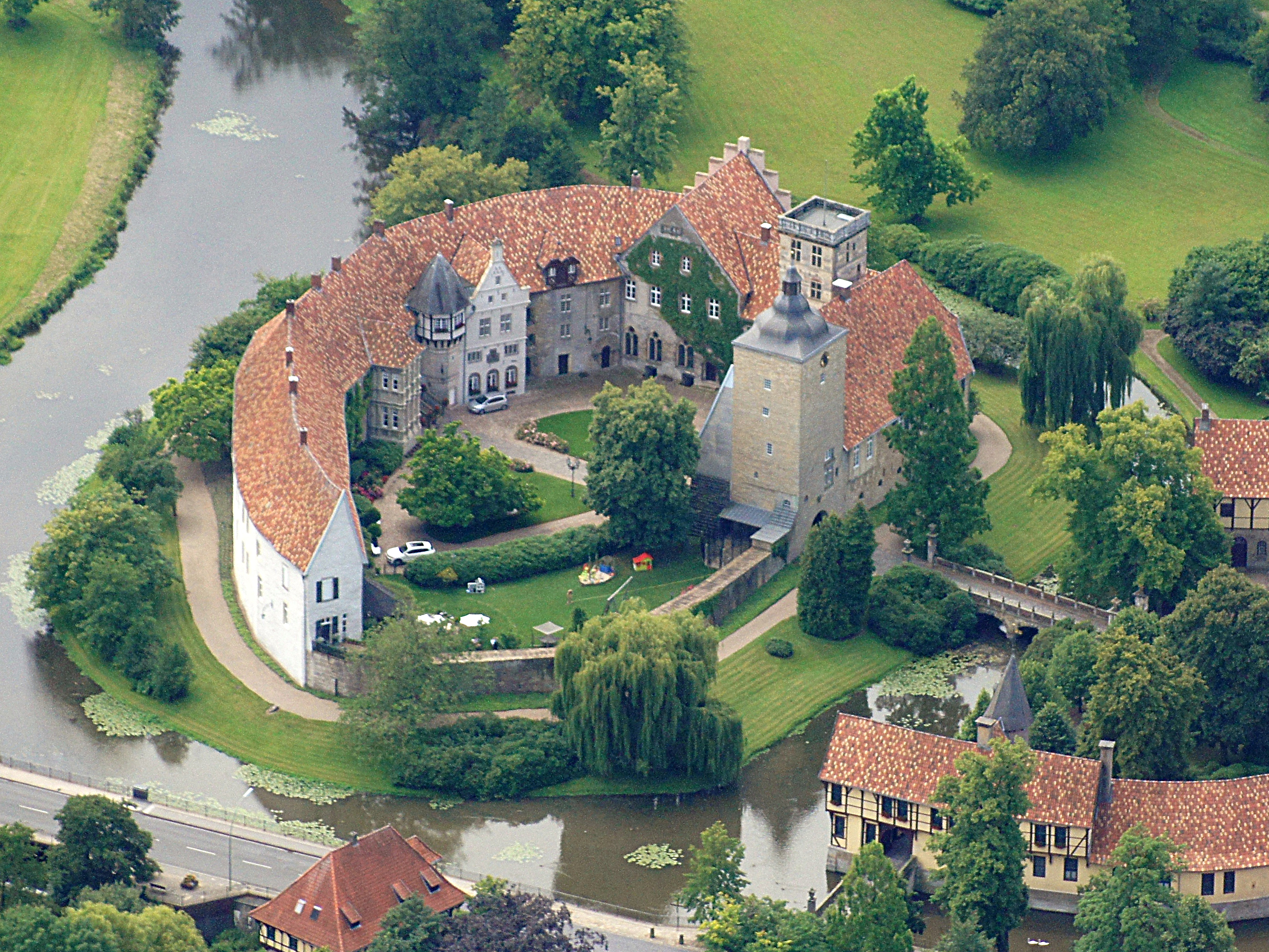
Steinfurt Castle

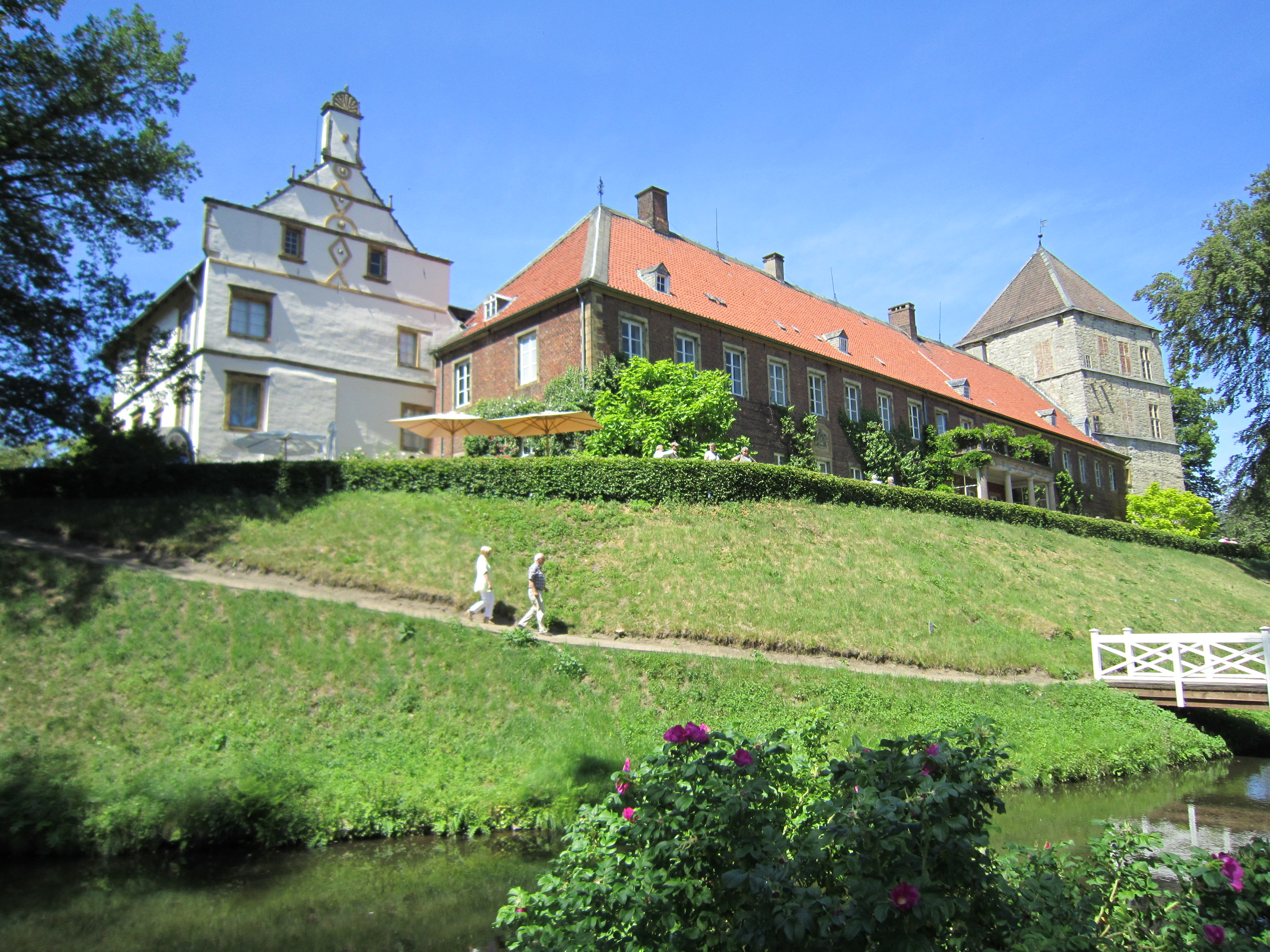
Rheda Castle

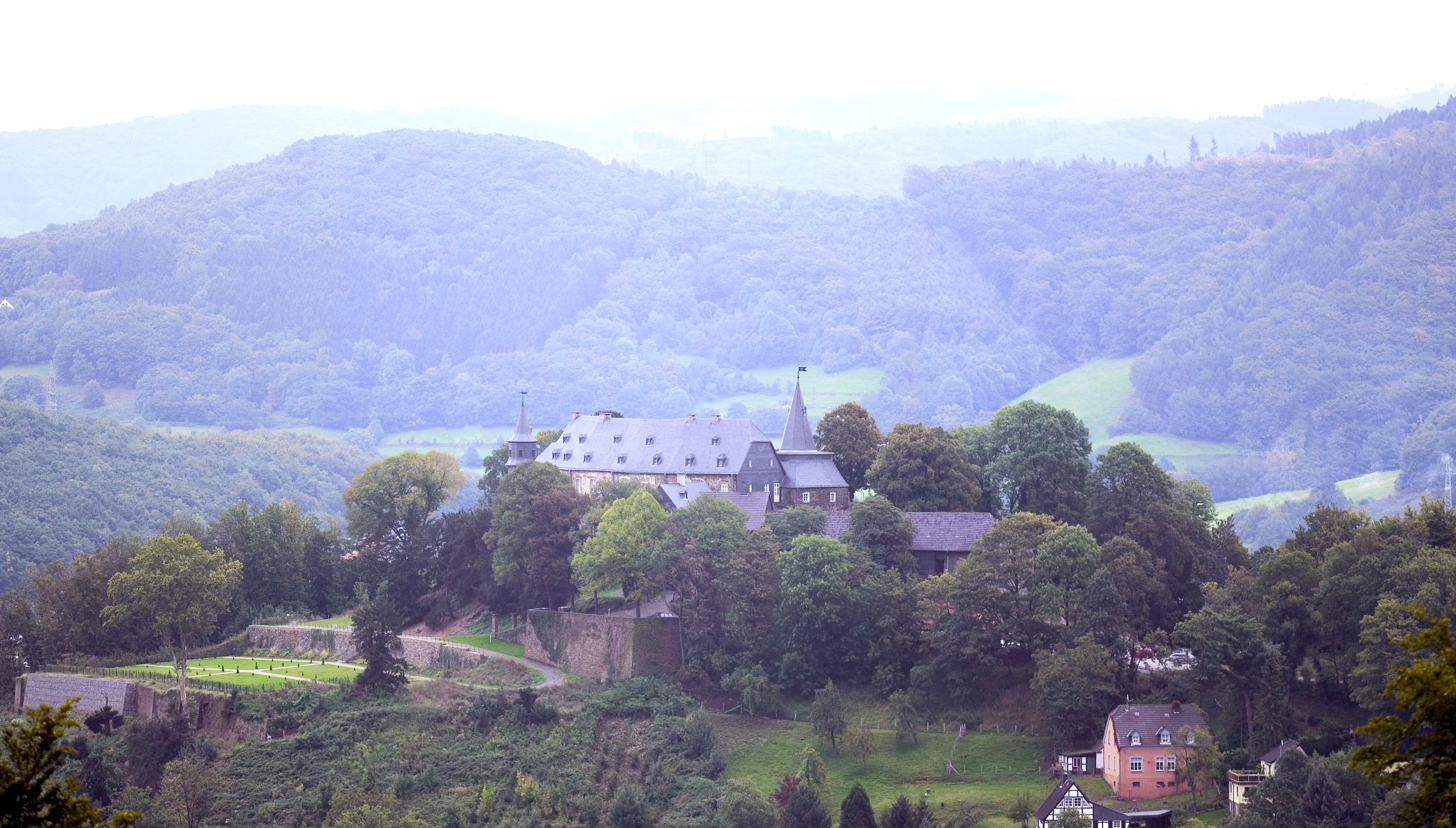
Hohenlimburg Castle

== Language ==
Although Bentheim is a German county, the dialect spoken, plattdeutsch, or "low german," is heavily influenced by the Dutch language.

== The people ==
"In spirit," writes Harger, "the people of Bentheim have never lost their independence. They became Hanoverians; they were invaded by Napoleon. Prussia took them over in 1866. They lived under the Kaiser and under Hitler. Through all this they came with good courage. If you ask them today about their identity, they just might tell you, 'Wy bin't Groofschappers' (We are from the County)."

Arranged marriages have been a longstanding tradition in Grafschaft (county) Bentheim. In former times, the parents arranged for their children to marry a distant relative. Weddings lasted three days with each invited guest giving about 100 DM ($50 in 1988) to the newly married couple. The couple signs the marriage contract before the ceremony. The presentation of the dowry and hope chest was part of the ceremony.

Until the 1950s, most gave birth, with aid of a midwife, in their own home. After birth, the baby would have its lower body tightly wrapped to prevent it becoming bowlegged and a tight fitting cap would be placed on its head, covering the ears, "so the ears would grow nice and close to the face." Children born during the week would be baptized in the Reformed tradition that coming Sunday, attended by the neighbors and midwife to stand as witnesses. In former times, the new mother would not leave the house during the first six weeks after giving birth.

When a family member dies, the next-door neighbor is the first to be contacted. He is in charge for the next four days, and instructs the other neighbors as to their duties. He is responsible for contacting the pastor (officiant), the bell ringer, and the gravedigger and making the burial arrangements. The town bell would be sounded one toll for each year the deceased had lived. If the death occurred after 9:00 p.m., this would wait until 9:00 the following morning. The casket builder would then begin his work, and the "death messengers" would be dispatched to inform the citizenry of the death with a message akin to "You are asked to attend the funeral of the departed ____________ at (time and date)." All in attendance at the funeral would wear unadorned black clothing. From 850 CE to about 1850 CE, burial was done in the churchyard, the idea being that the "church on earth" was the closest place to the "Church Triumphant." A grave was family-owned, and could be reused for another family member after 30 years. Napoleon decreed the establishment of cemetery yards outside of the city or village (for sanitary reasons) in 1808, an edict which was resisted in Bentheim, but finally adopted in 1850.

The funeral was followed by a church service featuring songs about resurrection. The length of the mourning period varied by relationship to the deceased: three years for the spouse, two years for the children, one year for the siblings, and 6 weeks for the next-door neighbor. During this period, unadorned black was to be worn, and this was strictly enforced.

== States of Bentheim ==
- County of Bentheim (c. 1050 – 1277)
- County of Bentheim-Alpen (1606–1629)
- County of Bentheim-Bentheim (1277–1530, 1643–1753, 1753–1803)
- County of Bentheim-Bentheim and Bentheim-Steinfurt (1803–1806)
- County of Bentheim-Limburg (1606–1632)
- County of Bentheim-Lingen (1450–1555)
- County of Bentheim-Steinfurt (1454–1803)
- County of Bentheim-Tecklenburg (1277–1557)
- County of Bentheim-Tecklenburg-Rheda (1606–1806)

== Counts of Bentheim (c. 1050 – 1277) ==
- Otto of Salm (1115–1149)
- Sophia (1149–1176) with...
- Dirk (VI of Holland) (1149–1157)
- Otto I (1176–1207)
- Baldwin (1207–1247)
- Otto II (1247–1277)

== Legacy ==
The modern Landkreis Grafschaft Bentheim which covers approximately the same territory takes its name from the former county and continues to use its coat of arms.

Since 2006 the Ritterfestspiele Bad Bentheim ("Knight Games of Bad Bentheim") celebrate each year the Medieval past in the garden of the Bentheim Castle with a Renaissance fair and a horse show.
