= Bentheim-Limburg =

County of the Holy Roman Empire

Bentheim-Limburg was a short-lived county of the Holy Roman Empire, created as a partition of Bentheim-Steinfurt in 1606, but it was later remerged into Bentheim-Steinfurt in 1632.

== Count of Bentheim-Limburg (1606–1632) ==
- Conrad Gumbert (1606–1632)
