= Bentheim-Tecklenburg-Rheda =

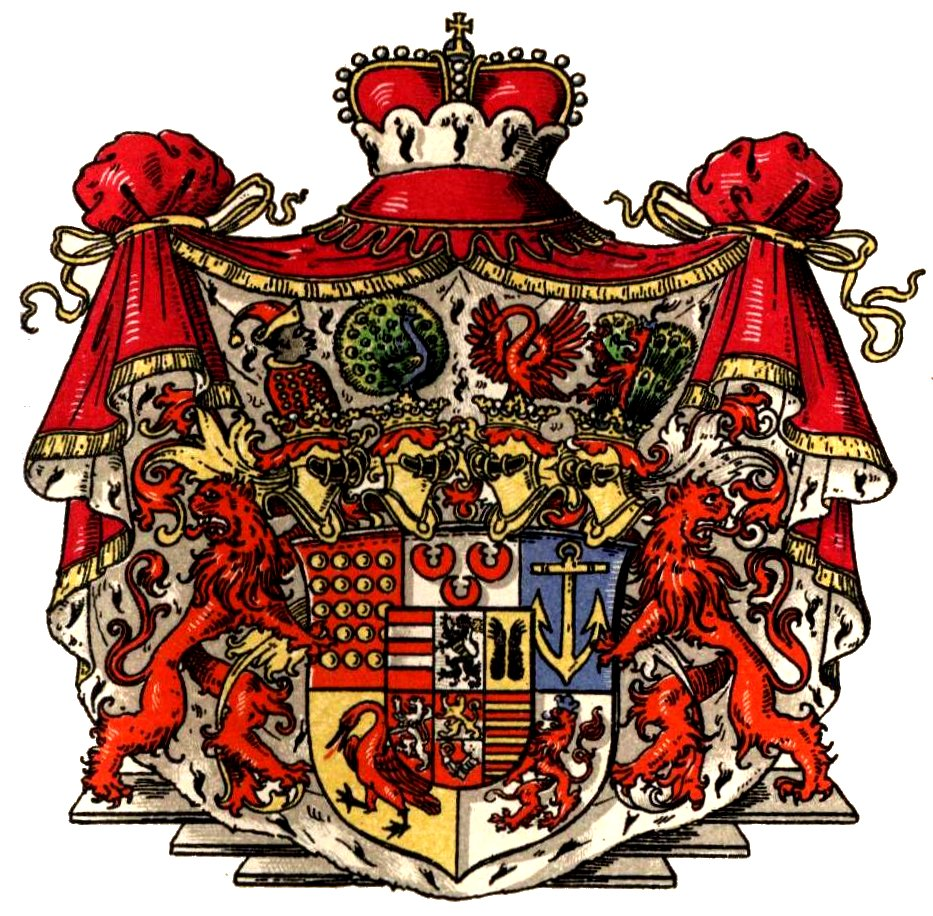
Current Coat of arms of the Princes and Counts of Bentheim-Tecklenburg-Rheda

Bentheim-Tecklenburg-Rheda was a historical county of the Holy Roman Empire, located in present northwestern North Rhine-Westphalia and southwestern Lower Saxony, Germany.

The princely branch of Bentheim-Tecklenburg-Rheda, with its family seats in Rheda and Hohenlimburg, is one of the two extant lines of the princely House of Bentheim, besides the Princes of Bentheim-Steinfurt who still own the castles of Bentheim and Steinfurt.

== History ==
Bentheim-Tecklenburg-Rheda emerged as a partition of Bentheim-Steinfurt-Tecklenburg-Limburg in 1606, when the older county of Bentheim-Tecklenburg was partitioned off again, after the death of Arnold III, Count of Bentheim-Steinfurt-Tecklenburg-Limburg (1554-1606). The territories of the ruling counts of Bentheim-Tecklenburg-Limburg and Rheda then consisted of the counties of Tecklenburg and Limburg and the lordship of Rheda, at times divided between family members again.

In 1701, Brandenburgian troops occupied Tecklenburg, as there had been a dispute about the county with the counts of Solms-Braunfels since 1577, and the latter sold their rights to Brandenburg. After the loss of Tecklenburg, the Bentheim-Tecklenburg branch still ruled the county of Limburg and the lordship of Rheda, although about 100 kilometers apart from each other, while the Bentheim-Steinfurt branch continued to rule in Bentheim and Steinfurt. In 1756 the residence was moved from Hohenlimburg to Rheda, which remains the main seat of the family to this day. In 1803 the secularized monasteries of Herzebrock and Clarholz, both located within the territories, were taken over by the counts. However, their sovereignty ended with the mediatisation in 1808 when the county became part of the Grand Duchy of Berg, and after the Congress of Vienna (1815) of the Kingdom of Prussia. In 1817, the count was created 1st Prince of Bentheim-Tecklenburg and Rheda by the Prussian king. In 1854 he received a hereditary seat in the Prussian House of Lords. The castles of Hohenlimburg and Rheda, Bosfeld House and the former abbeys of Herzebrock and Clarholz are still today owned by the House of Bentheim-Tecklenburg-Rheda.

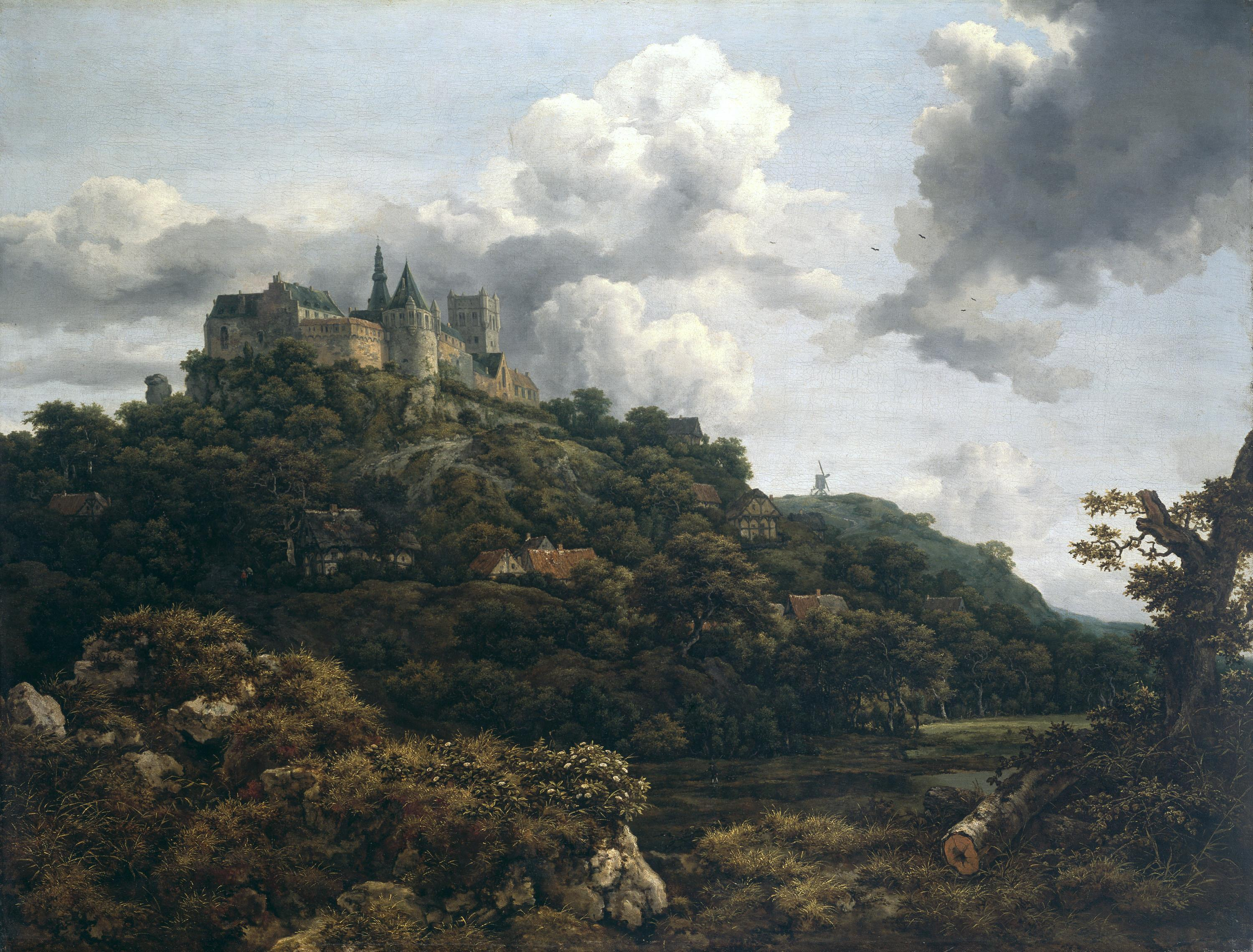
Bentheim Castle (by Jacob van Ruisdael (1653)

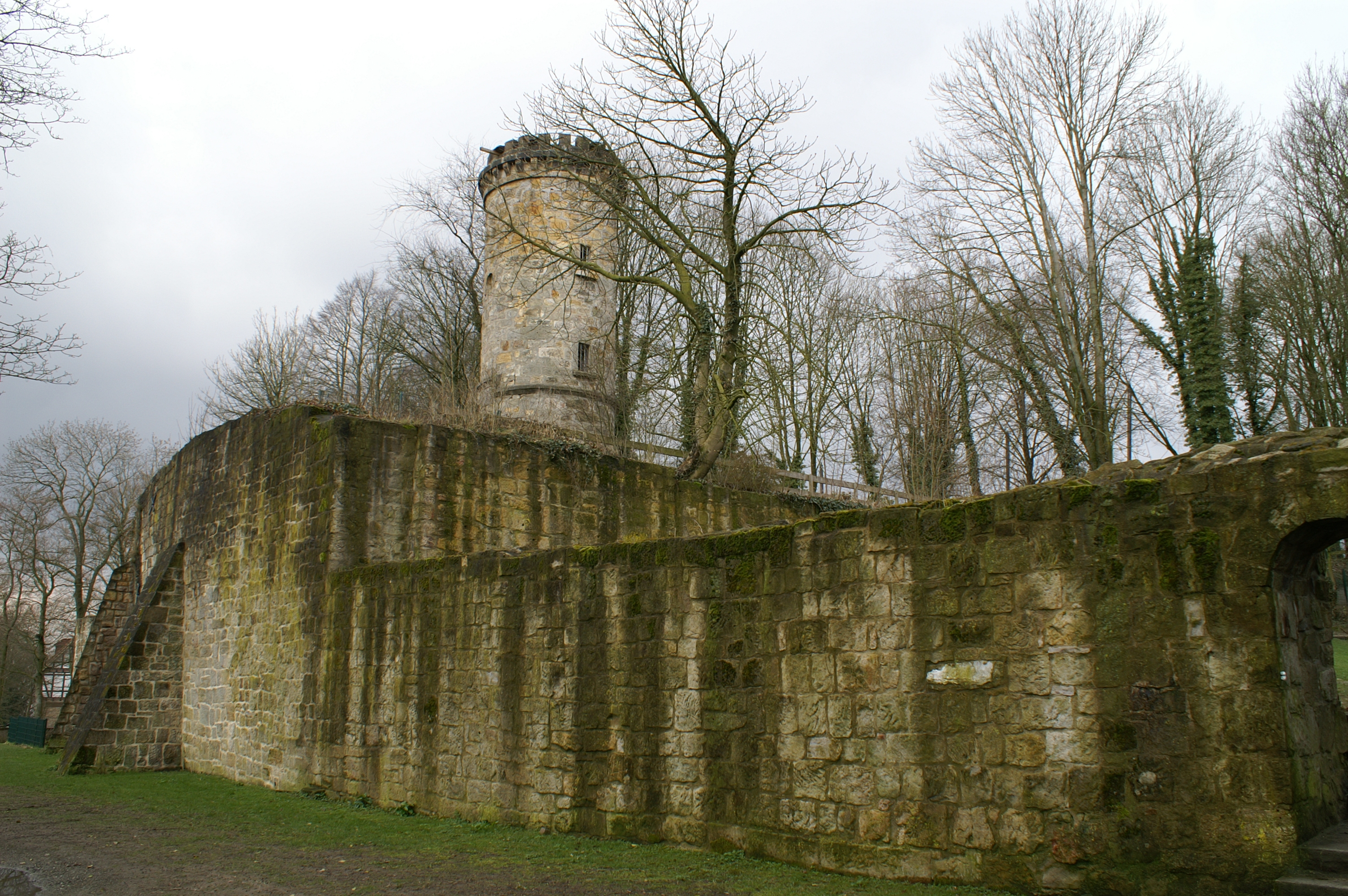
Tecklenburg Castle

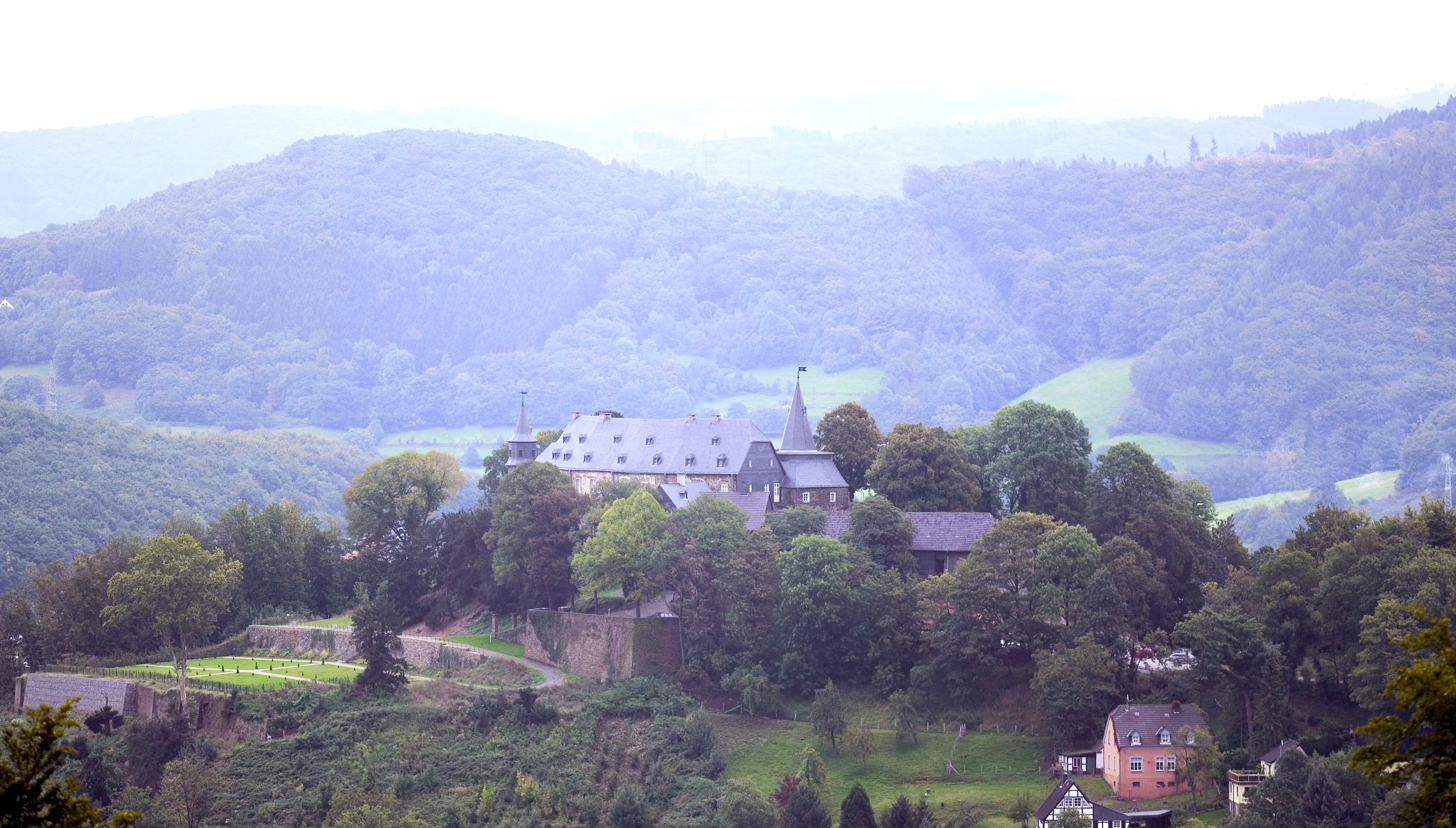
Hohenlimburg Castle

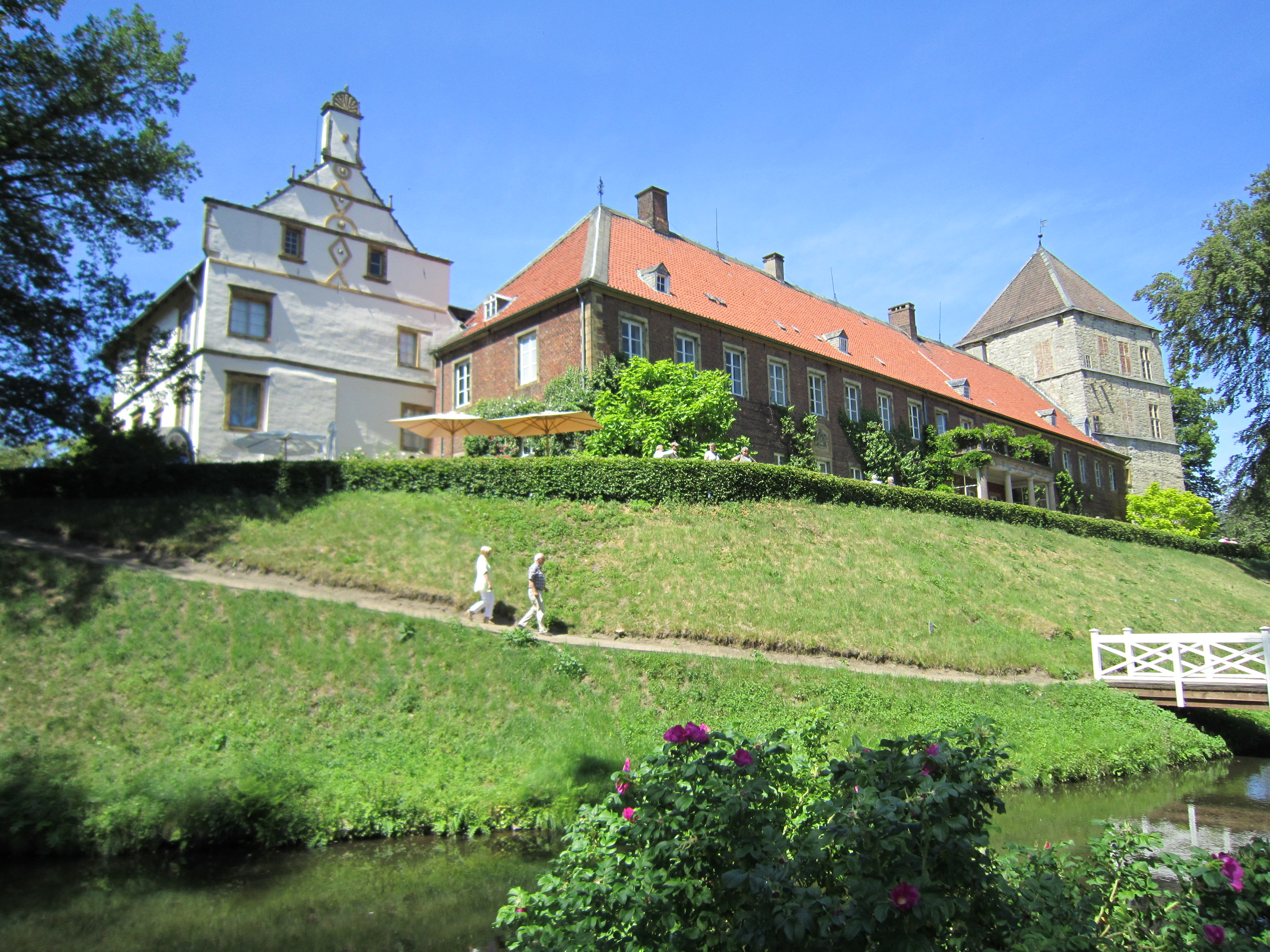
Rheda Castle

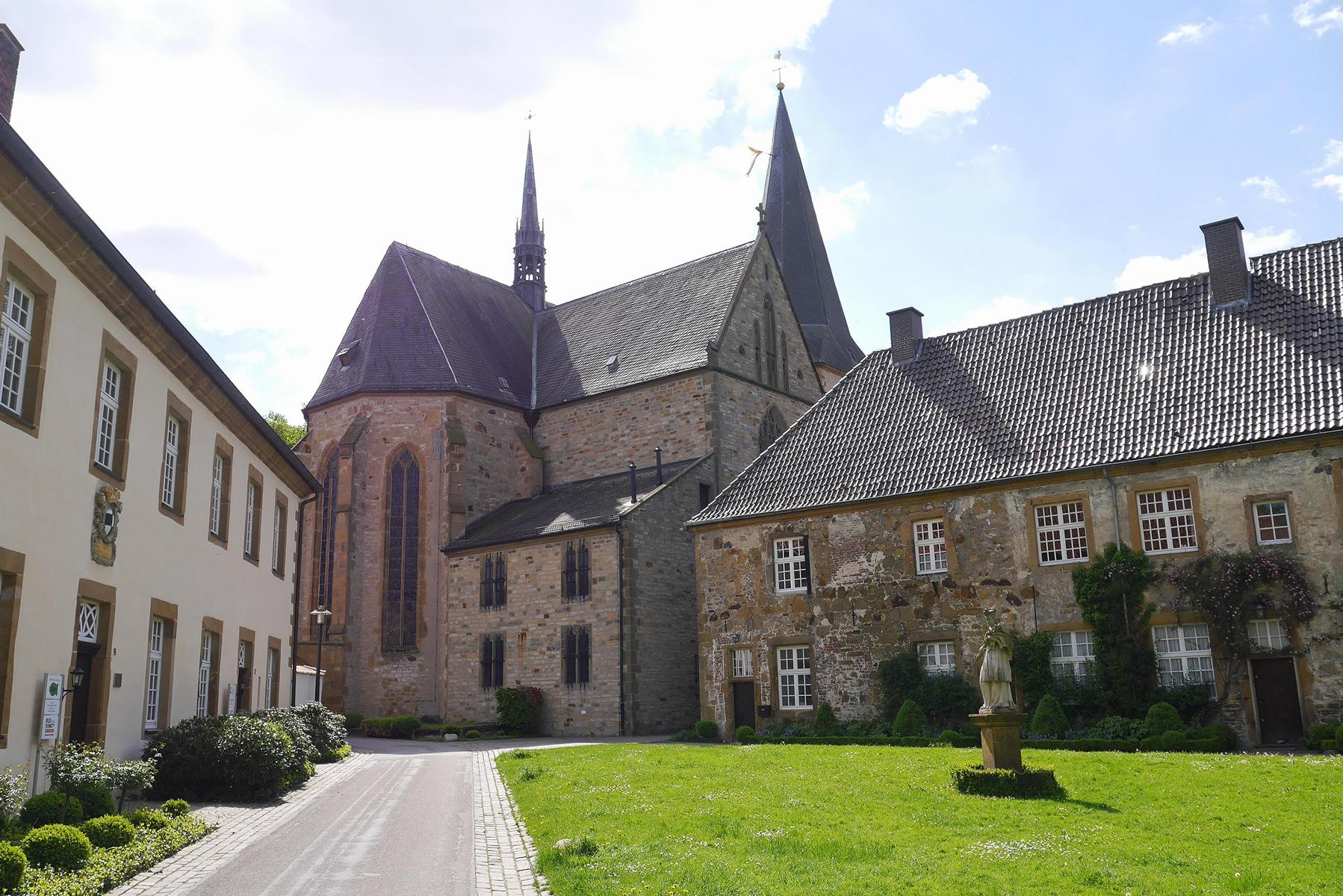
Herzebrock Abbey

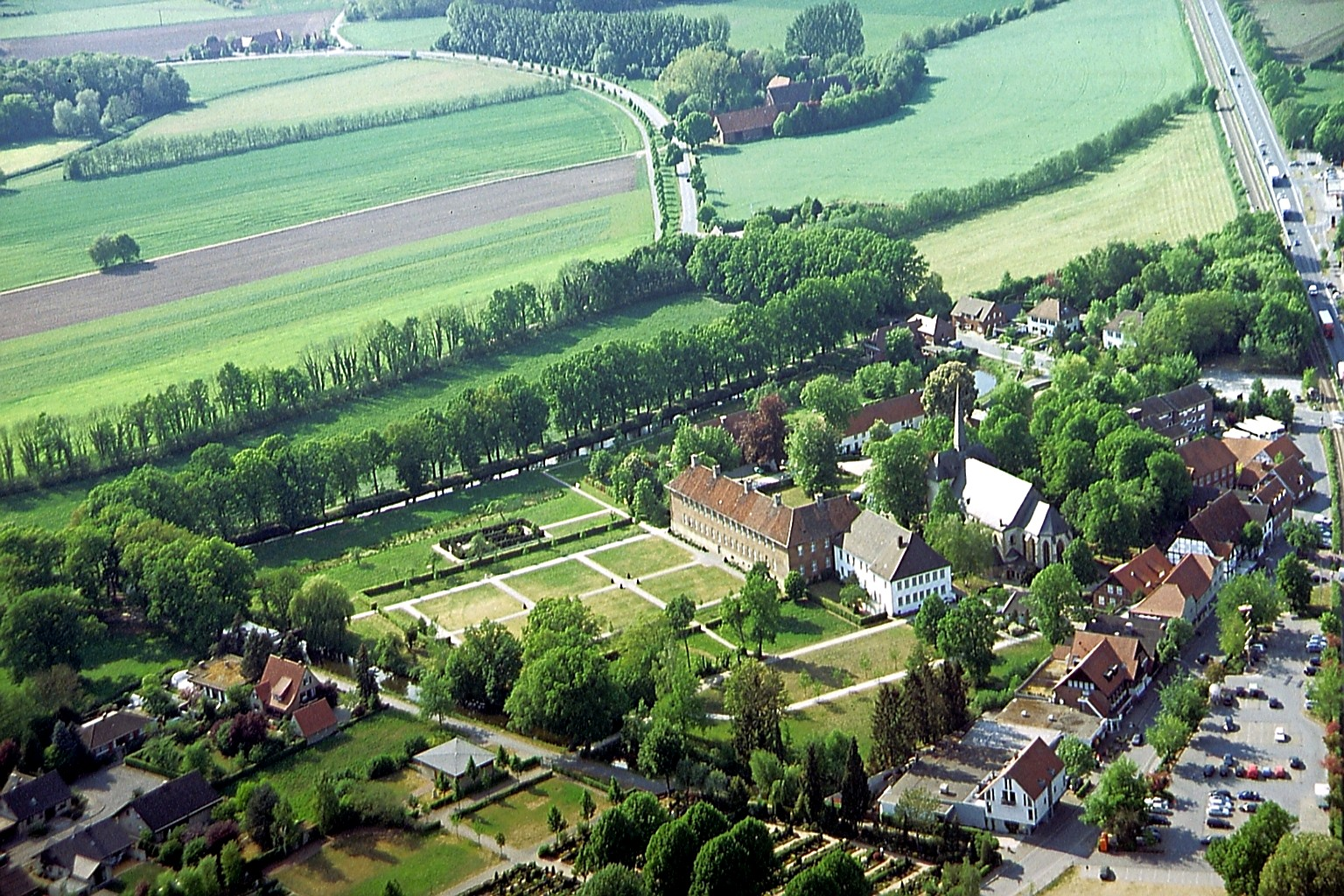
Clarholz Abbey

== Counts of Bentheim-Tecklenburg-Rheda (1606–1806) ==
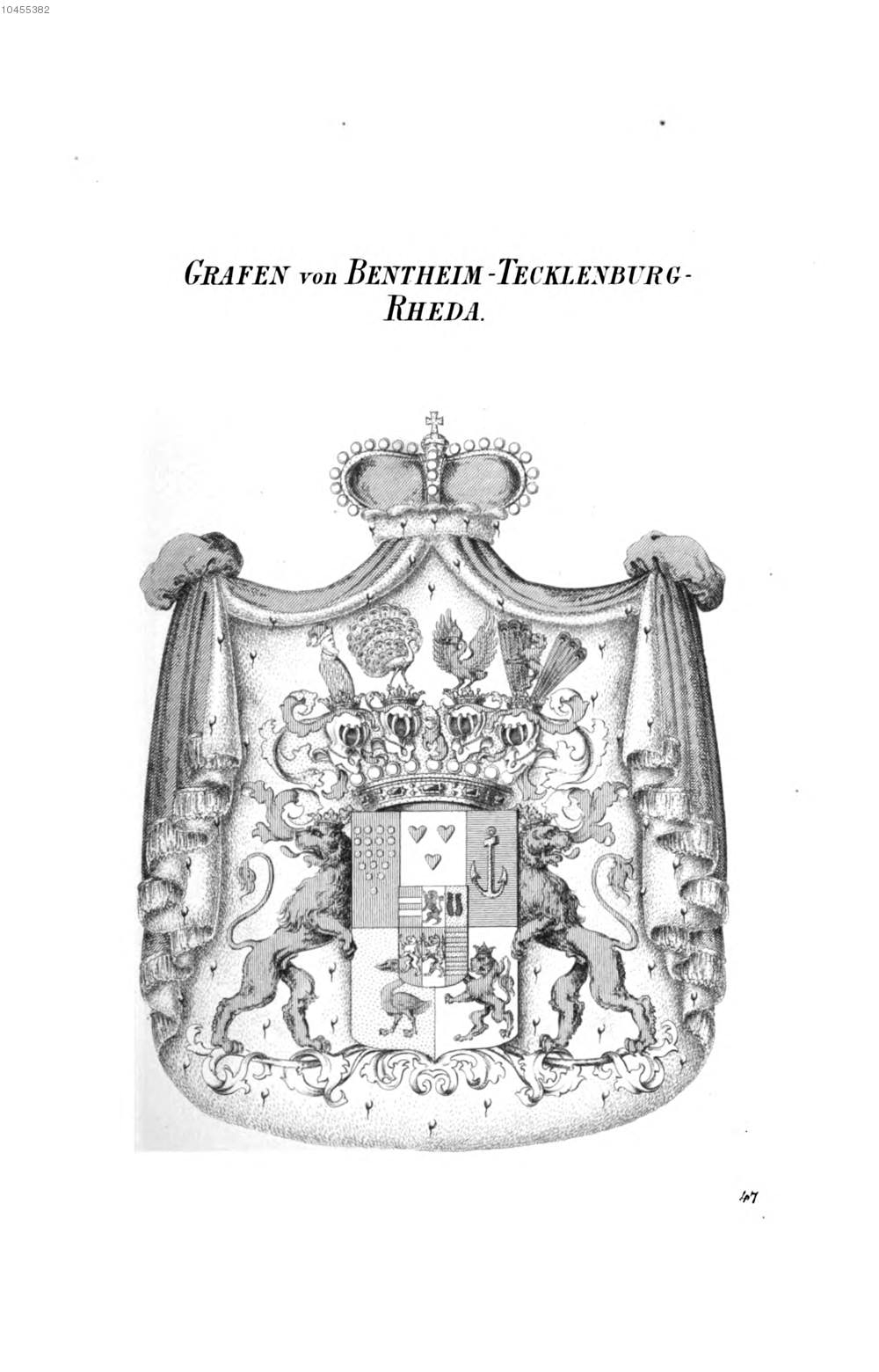
Coat of arms of the Counts of Bentheim Tecklenburg-Rheda, Tyroff: Wappenbuch des höheren Adels der deutschen Bundesstaaten, 1846–1865

- Adolph (1606–1625)
- Maurice (1625–1674)
- John Adolph (1674–1701)
- Frederick Maurice (1701–1710)
- Maurice Casimir I (1710–1768)
- Maurice Casimir II (1768–1805)
- Emil (1805–1806)

== Mediatized Counts of Bentheim-Tecklenburg-Rheda ==
1. Friedrich Wilhelm Christian August (b.1767) (1817-1835)
2. Moritz Kasimir Karl Christian Friedrich Alexander (1835-1877)
3. Richard Friedrich Julius Ludwig Moritz (1877-1921)
4. Karl Albert Moritz (1921-1967)
5. Peter Moritz Kasimir Hellmuth (1967-1987)
6. Christian Moritz Casimir (b.1958) (1987- )

== Mediatized Princes of Bentheim-Tecklenburg ==
1. Emil (b.1765) (1817-1837)
2. Moritz Kasimir (1837-1872)
3. Franz (1872-1885)
4. Gustav (1885-1909)
5. Adolf (1909-1967)
6. Moritz-Casimir (1967-2014)
7. Maximilian (2014-)
- Adolf, 5th Prince 1909-1967 (1889-1967) wed 1922 Princess Amélie of Schönburg-Waldenburg (1902-1995)
  - Moritz-Casimir, 6th Prince 1967-2014 (1923-2014) wed 1958 Countess Huberta von Hardenberg (born 1932)
    - Maximilian, 7th Prince 2014- (b.1969) wed 2000 Marissa Clare Fortescue (born 1973)
      - Prince Moritz, Hereditary Prince of Bentheim-Tecklenburg (b.2003)
      - Prince Carl-Emil (b.2010)
  - Prince Nikolaus (1925-2020) wed 1951 Countess Franziska Hoyos zu Stichsenstein (1921-2009)
  - Prince Heinrich (b.1940)
    - Prince Cédric (b.1978)
