= Bentheim-Alpen =

County of the Holy Roman Empire

Bentheim-Alpen was a short-lived County of the Holy Roman Empire, created as a partition of Bentheim-Steinfurt in 1606, but was later re-merged into Bentheim-Steinfurt in 1629.

== Count of Bentheim-Alpen (1606–1629) ==
- Frederick Ludolp (1606–1629)
