= Bentheim-Bentheim =

County in southeastern Lower Saxony, Germany

Bentheim-Bentheim was a county in southeastern Lower Saxony, Germany. By 1806, the borders were the modern borders of the District of Bentheim. The last Count of Bentheim-Bentheim died on 19 February 1803.

This county was formed from the county of Bentheim in 1277, and from it was formed Bentheim-Steinfurt in 1544. Bentheim-Bentheim reemerged as a county in 1643 and was mediatised to Berg in 1806, before being annexed to France in 1810. It was granted to Hanover by the Congress of Vienna.

== Counts of Bentheim-Bentheim (1277–1530) ==
Gerulfingen

- Egbert (1277–1305)
- John (1305–1333)
- Simon (1333–1348)
- Otto III (1348–1364)
- Bernard I (1364–1421)

Götterswyk

- Eberwin I (1421–1454)
- Bernard II (1454–1473)
- Eberwin II (1473–1530)

== Counts of Bentheim-Bentheim (1643–1806) ==
- Philip Conrad (1643–1668)
- Arnold Maurice (1668–1701)
- Herman Frederick (1701–1723)
- Louis Francis (1723–1731)
- Frederick Charles (1731–1803)
- Louis (Count of Bentheim-Steinfurt) (1803–1806)
