= Bentheim Castle =

Castle in Germany

Coordinates: 52.3025°N 7.1563°E

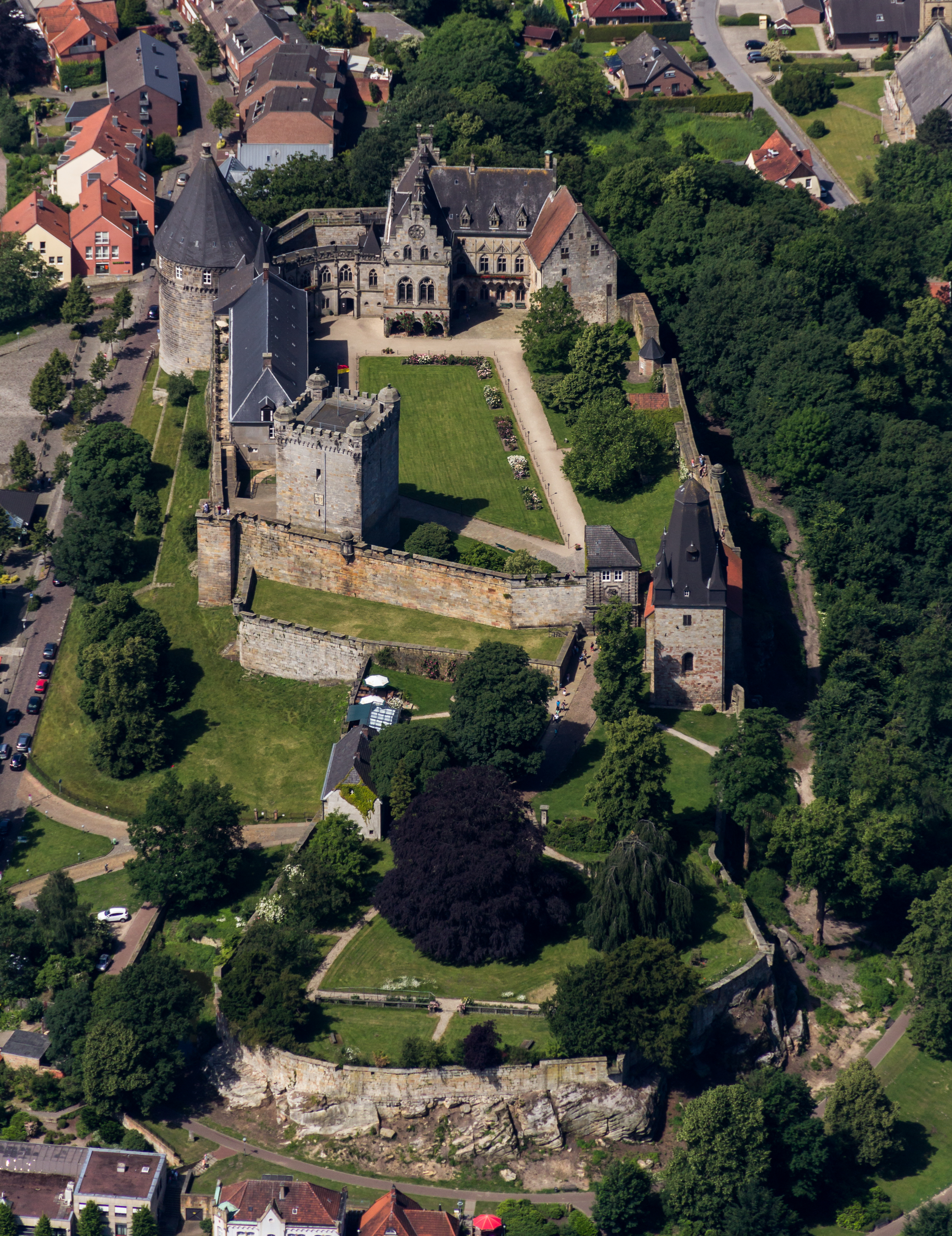
Bentheim Castle

Bentheim Castle (German: Burg Bentheim) is an early medieval hill castle in Bad Bentheim, Lower Saxony, Germany. The castle is first mentioned in the 11th century under the name binithem.

== Situation ==
The castle is built on a protrusion of Bentheim sandstone, which not only provided building materials for the castle itself but was also a valued export product. This Bentheimer Höhenrücken is the last protrusion of the nearby Teutoburger forest. Its elevated position in an otherwise very flat landscape provides an excellent view and thus a strategic location to build a castle.

== History ==
=== Until 1500 ===
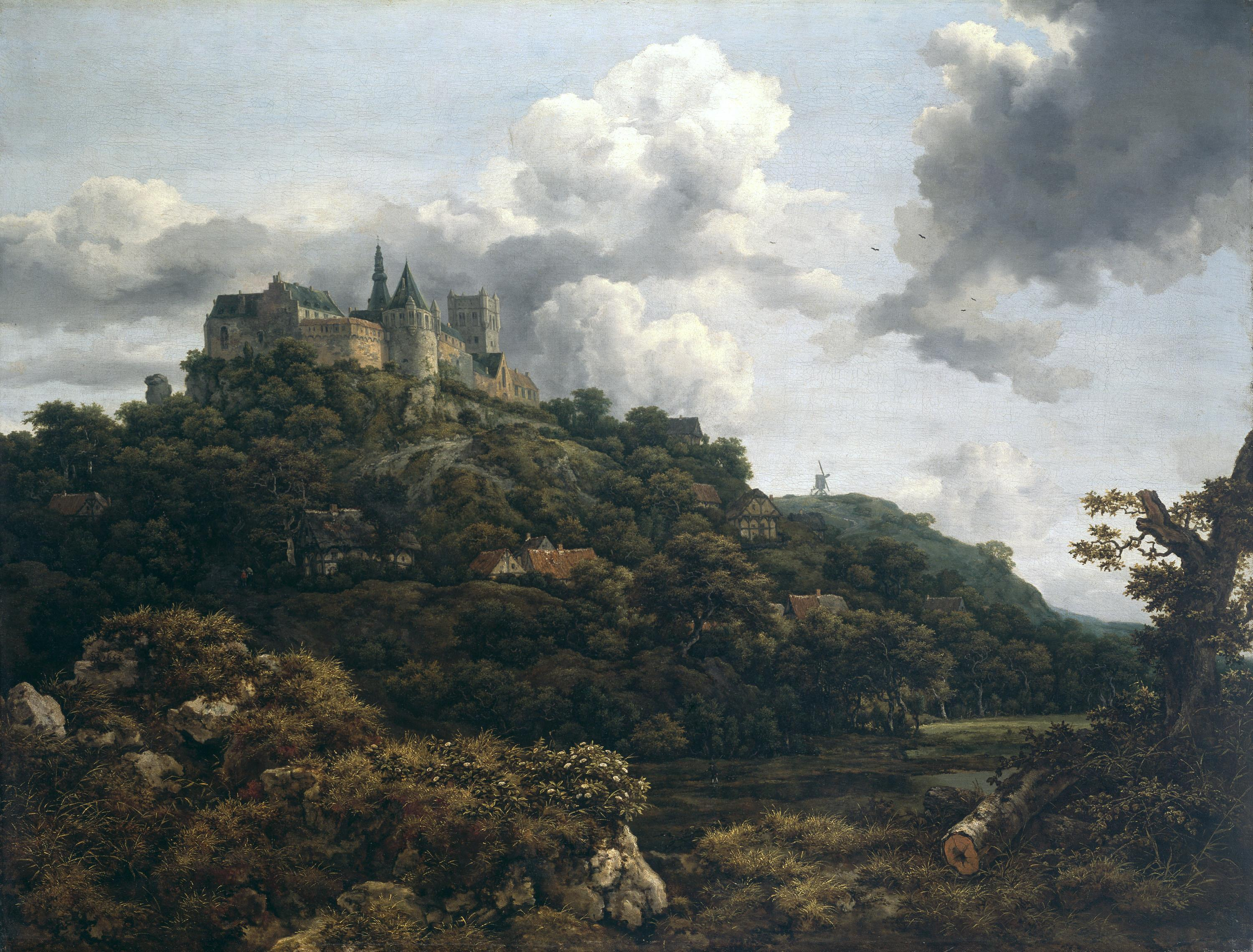
Burg Bentheim by Jacob van Ruisdael (1653)

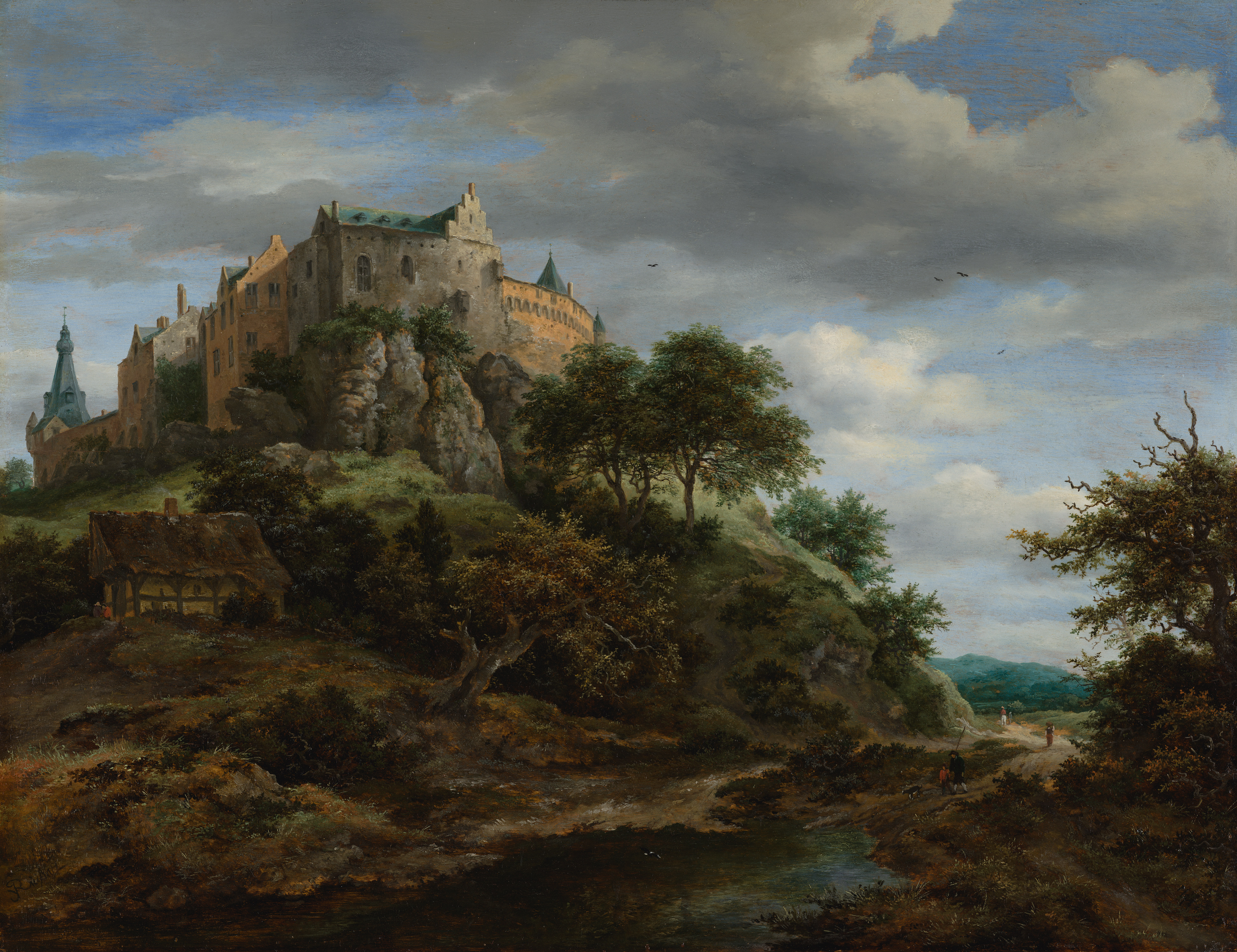
Burg Bentheim by Jacob van Ruisdael (second version)

The earliest history of the castle, which was erected on the remains of an earlier refuge castle is largely unknown. In the registries of Werden Abbey (1050) the castle is mentioned, as Binedheim, in and contributes grain, honey and 2 solidi. A document from 1020 names Otto von Northeim as the owner of the castle. In 1116, the castle is completely destroyed in the war between Herzog Lothar von Süpplinburg, better known as Lothar III and Heinrich V. The Annalista Saxo describes how Lothar "lays siege to Binithem, a fine and strong city and burned it after it was conquered". The epithet "strong" (firmam) suggests the castle played a vital role in the city’s defences, though it is assumed it was a wooden structure, and not yet a stone one.

The castle is soon rebuilt and this time in stone by Otto von Salm, brother in law of the victorious Lothar III, whose wife Gertrud von Northeim uses it as a residence. In 1050 she is mentioned as comitissa de Benetheim, which is the first documented member of the Counts of Bentheim.

In 1146 a war erupted between Otto von Rheineck and the Bishop of Utrecht concerning the jurisdiction over Twente and Otto and his knights were defeated near Ootmarsum and the castle became a fee of the Diocese of Utrecht and the Bishop claimed the palace and the chapel for his personal use until 1190. Otto's son and only heir, Otto II von Salm-Rheineck tried to recapture the castle but fell into the hands of Hermann von Stahleck in 1148. He spent some time as a prisoner in Schönburg near Oberwesel and was strangled the next year. To the bishops of Münster and Utrecht the independent county remained a thorn in the side, and most notably in 1374 both launched attacks upon the castle.

Otto's daughter, Sophie von Salm-Rheineck inherited the castle. She married Dirk VI, Count of Holland and the castle (1154) and the county (1165) thus passed into the hands of the Counts of Holland. Their son, Otto the Younger is mentioned in a deed by Henry the Lion as comes de Binitheim. He is the first of the counts of Bentheim-Holland, whose rule lasts until 1421 when the castle passes into the hands of Eberwin IV von Götterswick, a cousin of the last count of Bentheim-Holland.

=== After 1500 ===
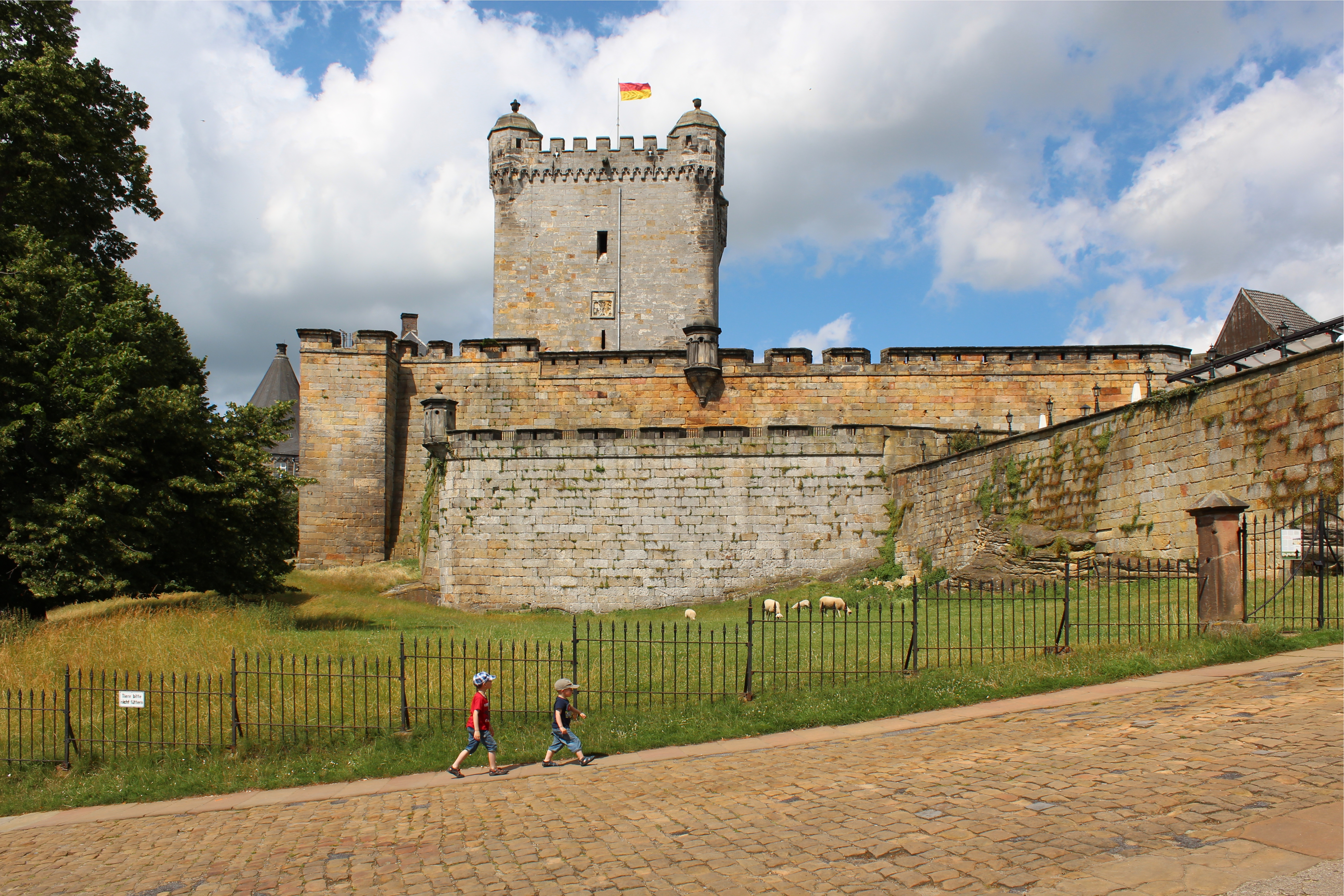
The Pulverturm (Gunpowder Tower)

The name Grafen von Bentheim first appears in 1421. In 1486 Graf Eberwin II gets a Fee from Frederick III and the County of Bentheim becomes an independent political entity. In 1489 this is reflected in the Burg, and the construction of the Pulverturm starts Between 1588 and 1593, Arnold II chooses the side of the Reformation, following the church reformers Calvin and Zwingli. During the Thirty Years' War, the county pays the price for its choice and is repeatedly sacked by Spanish troops. Much of the castle is destroyed in the process. This is repeated during the Seven Years' War, in which the Burg repeatedly comes under siege from French and British troops and is taken several times. In 1795 it served as a field hospital in the war against the revolutionary French Army and was set ablaze and taken by general Dominique Vandamme.

The castle is still owned by the Prince of Bentheim-Steinfurt who is living at Steinfurt Castle. It is home to some of his siblings and is also open to the public as a family museum. Since 2006, the castle gardens have also hosted the annual Knight Games.
