= Bentheim-Steinfurt =

Historic county in North Rhine-Westphalia, Germany

County of Bentheim-Steinfurt
- 1454–1806
- Coat of Arms (1454–1589)
- Status: State of the Holy Roman Empire
- Capital: Steinfurt
- Religion: Roman Catholicism; Lutheranism; (Majority from 1544)
- Government: County
- Count of Bentheim-Steinfurt
  - 1454-1466: Aronold I (first)
  - 1780-1806: Louis Ernest (last)
- History
  - Partitioned from the County of Bentheim: 1454
  - Split off Bentheim-Tecklenburg-Rheda: 1606
  - Split off Bentheim-Bentheim: 1643
  - Disestablished: 1806
Preceded by
County of Bentheim
Succeeded by
Kingdom of Prussia
Bentheim-Tecklenburg-Rheda
Bentheim-Bentheim
- Today part of: North Rhine-Westphalia

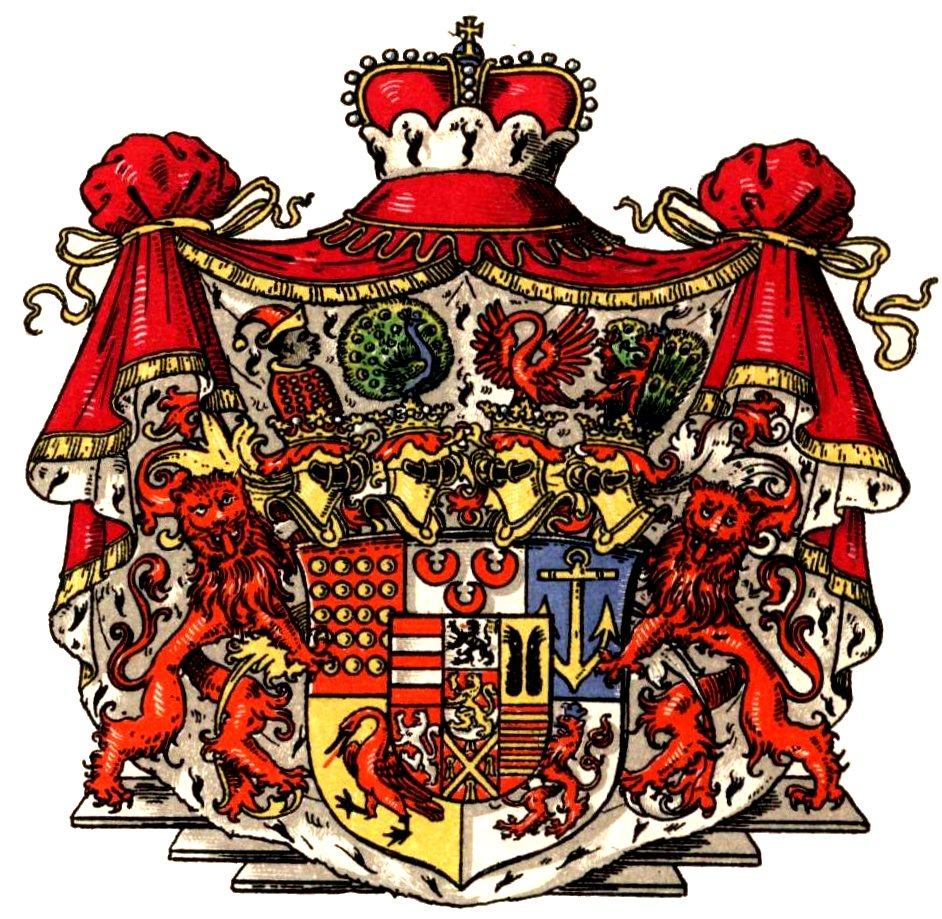
Princely arms of Bentheim-Steinfurt

Bentheim-Steinfurt was a historical county located in northwestern North Rhine-Westphalia in the region surrounding Steinfurt, Germany. Bentheim-Steinfurt was a partition of Bentheim-Bentheim, itself a partition of the County of Bentheim. Bentheim-Steinfurt was partitioned: between itself and Bentheim-Tecklenburg-Rheda in 1606; and between itself and Bentheim-Bentheim in 1643.

== History ==
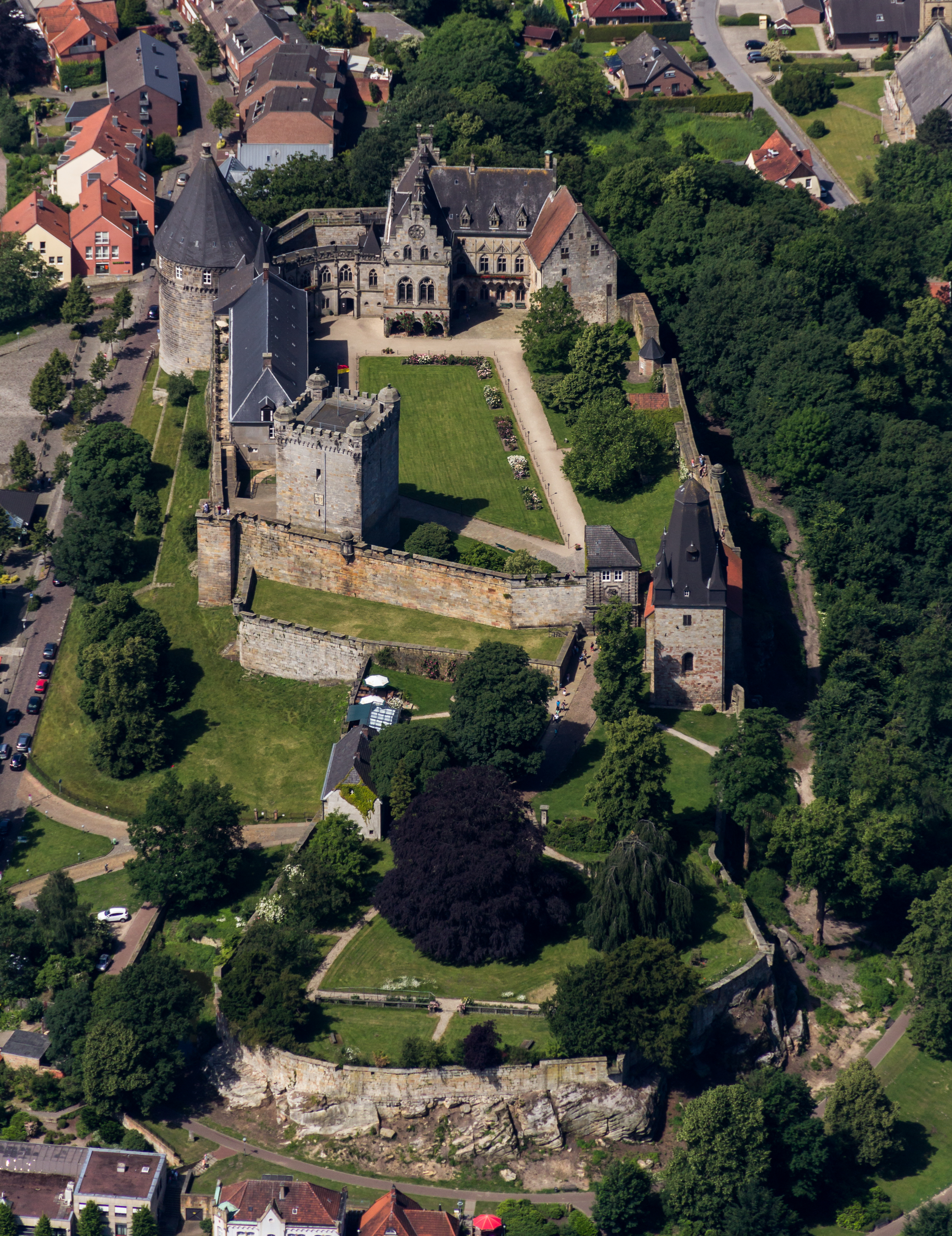
Bentheim Castle

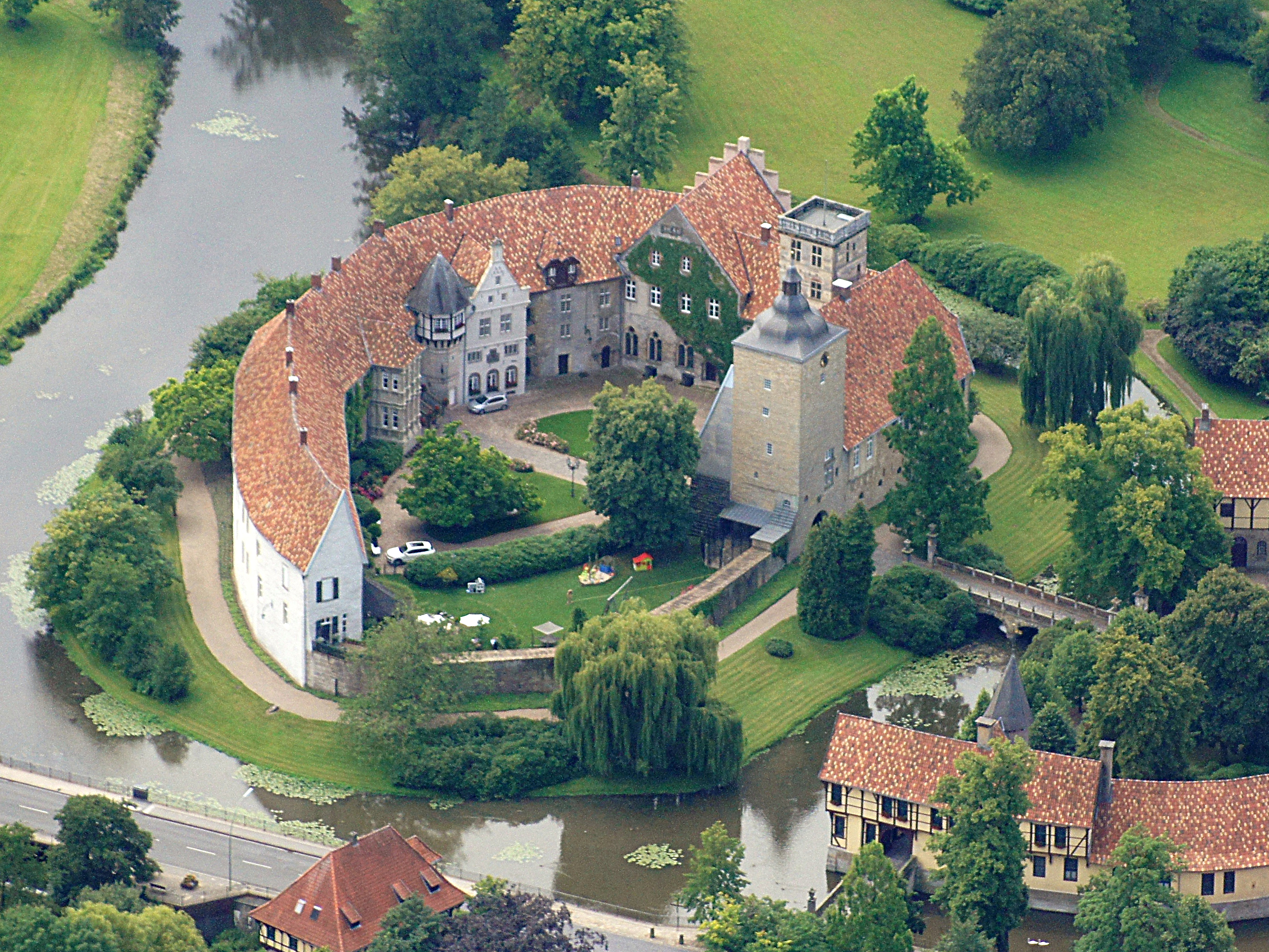
Steinfurt Castle

Bentheim-Steinfurt and its territories were converted to Lutheranism in 1544 by Count Arnold II. He was succeeded by his less-religious son, Eberwin III. After the latter's early death at age 26, he was succeeded by his infant child, Arnold III, under the regency of Anna of Tecklenburg. Arnold III married Magdalena of Neuenahr in 1576, and he began attempts to properly convert the county to Protestantism. In the autumn of 1587, Lutheran preachers from across Germany were invited to help reform the Counties of Bentheim, Steinfurt, Lingen and Tecklenburg. The new laws were largely modelled on those of Mörs, and were introduced in Bentheim and Tecklenburg, in the following year, and finally Steinfurt in 1591. Arnold also founded a successful school in Schüttorf during 1588, which was relocated to Steinfurt in 1591 and taught Latin, law, theology, philosophy and (from 1607) medicine. Arnold died in 1606, and was succeeded by his sons Arnold Jobst, William Henry, Frederick Liudolph and Conrad Gumbert. Arnold Jobst created the Higher Church Council 1613 in the Bentheim territory as the supreme spiritual authority below the counts, and also in that year the Reformed Church of Bentheim was created, comprising also the Twelve Articles.

In 1643, Arnold Jobst died and was succeeded by his son Ernest William. He was greatly influenced by Bernhard von Galen, the Prince-Bishop of Münster, and in 1688 he converted to Roman Catholicism. A fierce crisis ensued in which the Protestant preachers were expelled. Ernest William died in 1693, and it was left to his son and heir, Count Ernest, to resolve the troubles, doing so by converting to Lutheranism in 1701. A new reformed Church constitution was released, modelled on the 1678 Church Constitution of Lingen (it would continue in use until 1971). Bentheim-Steinfurt obtained the Castle Batenburg in 1700, although by that time it had ceased to be permanently garrisoned, and it was destroyed by the French in 1795.

Count Louis obtained the County of Bentheim-Bentheim in 1803. Bentheim-Steinfurt was mediatised to Prussia in 1806, ceded to Berg in 1809, restored to Prussia in 1813 and ceded to the Kingdom of Hanover in 1815. On 21 January 1817, the family was raised to the rank of Prince.

Today, the still existing branches of the House of Bentheim are the Princes of Bentheim-Steinfurt with their seat at Steinfurt Castle (also still owners of the ancestral seat Burg Bentheim) and the Princes of Bentheim-Tecklenburg-Rheda with their seat at Rheda Castle (also still owners of Hohenlimburg Castle) and the Counts Bentheim-Tecklenburg-Rheda.

== Counts of Bentheim-Steinfurt (1454–1806) ==
- Arnold I (1454–1466)
- Eberwin II (1466–1498)
- Arnold II (1498–1544)
- Eberwin III (1544–1562)
- Arnold III (1562–1606)
- Anna of Tecklenburg (1562–1577) (regent)
- Arnold Jobst (1606–1643) with
  - William Henry (1606–1632) and
  - Frederick Ludolph (1606–1629) and
  - Conrad Gumbert (1606–1618)
- Ernest William (1643–1693)
- Ernest (1693–1713)
- Charles Frederick (1713–1733)
- Charles Paul Ernest (1733–1780)
- Louis (Count of Bentheim-Bentheim) (1780–1806) raised to Prince 1817

== (Mediatized) Princes of Bentheim and Steinfurt (1866–) ==
- Ludwig Wilhelm, 1st Prince 1866–1890 (1812–1890)
  - Alexis, 2nd Prince 1890–1919 (1845–1919)
    - Viktor Adolf, 3rd Prince 1919–1961 (1883–1961)
      - Christian, 4th Prince 1961–2023 (1923–2023)
      - Prince Reinhard Georg (1934–2021)
        - Carl Ferdinand (1977–), 5th Prince 2023–, adopted by his uncle Prince Christian
          - Prince Jonathan (2008–)
        - Prince Christoph Peter (1978–)
    - Prince Karl Georg (1884–1951)
      - Prince Hubertus (1919–2010)
        - Prince Alexander (1959–)
        - Prince Nikolaus (1962–)
          - Prince Leopold (2000–)
          - Prince Xavier (2004–)
          - Prince Lorenz (2006–)
      - Prince Botho (1924–2001)
        - Prince George Victor (1950–)
          - Prince Maximilian (1986–)
        - Prince Wolfgang (1952–2022)
          - Prince Benedikt (1995–)
