= Steinfurt =

- Town
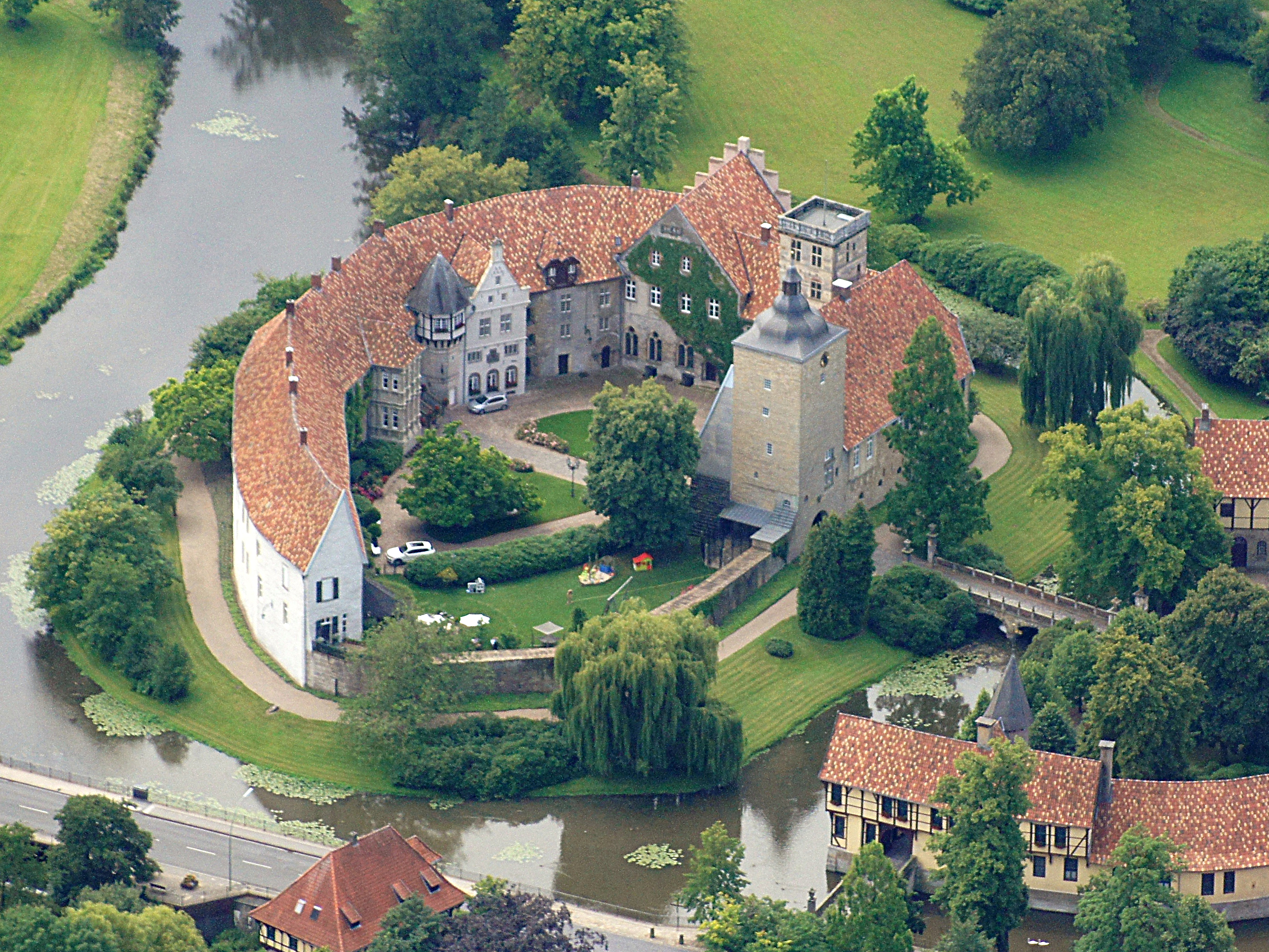
- Burgsteinfurt Castle

- Flag Coat of arms

- Location of Steinfurt within Steinfurt district
- Interactive map of Steinfurt
- Location within Germany Location within North Rhine-Westphalia
- Coordinates: 52°08′51″N 7°20′39″E
- Country: Germany
- State: North Rhine-Westphalia
- Admin. region: Münster
- District: Steinfurt

Government
  - Mayor (2025–30): Christian Franke (Ind.)

Area
  - Total: 111.67 km^{2} (43.12 sq mi)
- Elevation: 65 m (213 ft)

Population (2025-12-31)
  - Total: 34,822
  - Density: 311.83/km^{2} (807.63/sq mi)
- Time zone: UTC+01:00 (CET)
  - Summer (DST): UTC+02:00 (CEST)
- Postal codes: 48565
- Dialling codes: 02551 (Burgsteinfurt), 02552 (Borghorst)
- Vehicle registration: ST, BF, TE
- Website: www.steinfurt.de

Steinfurt (German: [ˈʃtaɪnfʊʁt]; Westphalian: Stemmert) is a city in North Rhine-Westphalia, Germany. It is the capital of the district of Steinfurt. From c. 1100–1806, it was the capital of the County of Steinfurt.

== Geography ==
Steinfurt is situated north-west of Münster, North Rhine-Westphalia. Its name, roughly meaning “stony ford”, came into being in 1975 when the two hitherto independent towns Borghorst and Burgsteinfurt amalgamated. Borghorst became a prosperous city due to its flourishing textile industry, whereas Burgsteinfurt has always rather been characterized by culture and administration. Tourists of the 19th century passing Burgsteinfurt praised the city as the "Paradise of Westphalia" and "Royal Diamond" (Königsdiamant) because of its 75 monumental buildings and moated castle.

=== Neighbouring municipalities ===
Steinfurt borders Ochtrup, Wettringen, Neuenkirchen, Emsdetten, Nordwalde, Altenberge, Laer, Horstmar and Metelen.

=== City division ===
Steinfurt consists of Borghorst and Burgsteinfurt, each with three attached farming communities:

- Burgsteinfurt
  - Hollich
  - Sellen
  - Veltrup
- Borghorst
  - Dumte
  - Wilmsberg
  - Ostendorf

== History ==
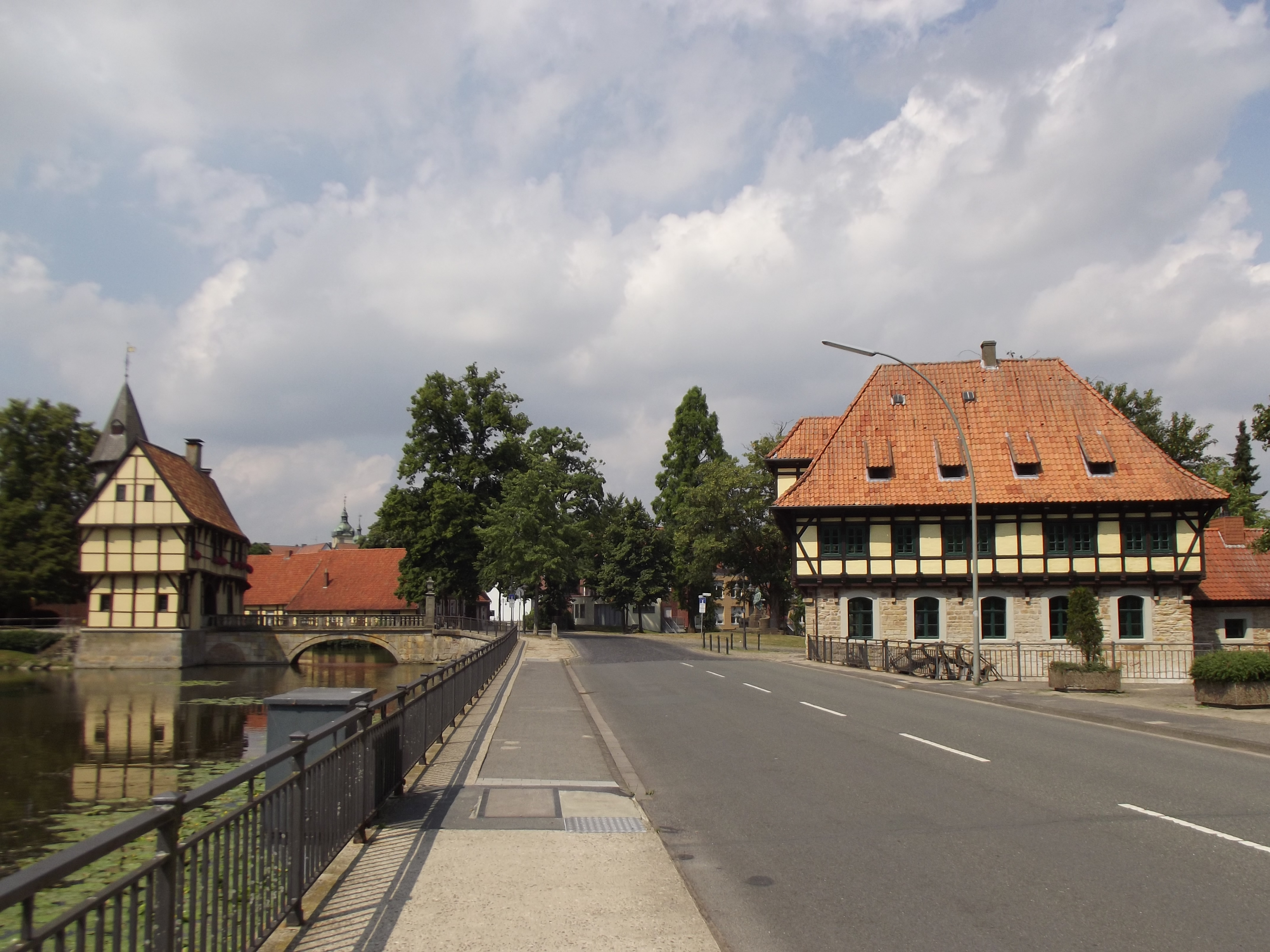
Castle and watermill

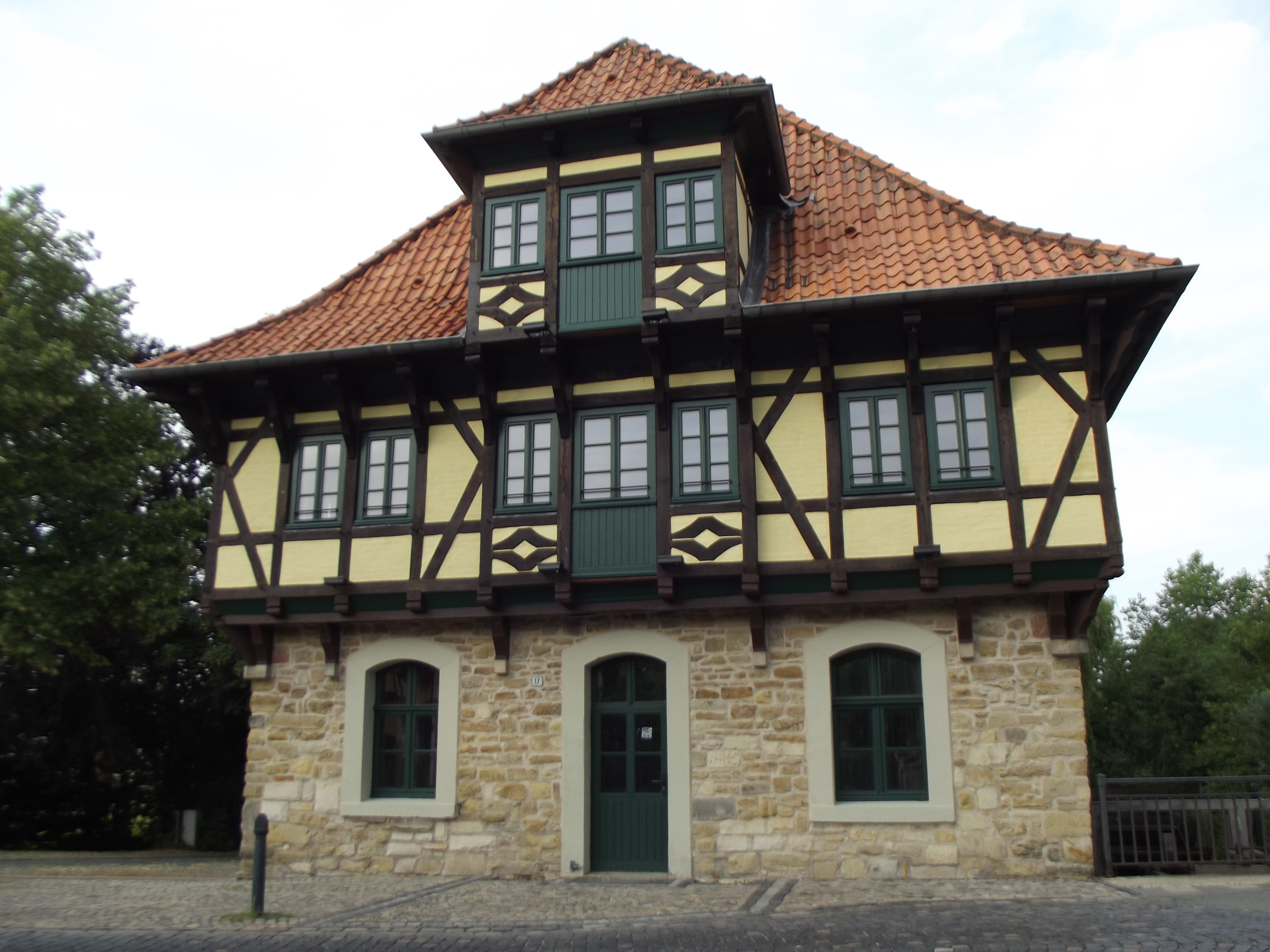
Front view of the mill "Schlossmühle"

Predominantly influenced by Protestants, it is home to one of the oldest academies of continuing education in Westphalia. The city harbours moated castles. These landmarks distinguish Steinfurt from the neighbouring countryside. There is the Bagno in Burgsteinfurt, a forested amusement park which dates back to the 18th century with one of the oldest free-standing European concert halls.

Steinfurt is often called "Stemmert" by its inhabitants.

The origins of Burgsteinfurt are unknown. It is assumed different circumstances led to its foundation, in particular farming, the river Aa and the Order of Saint John

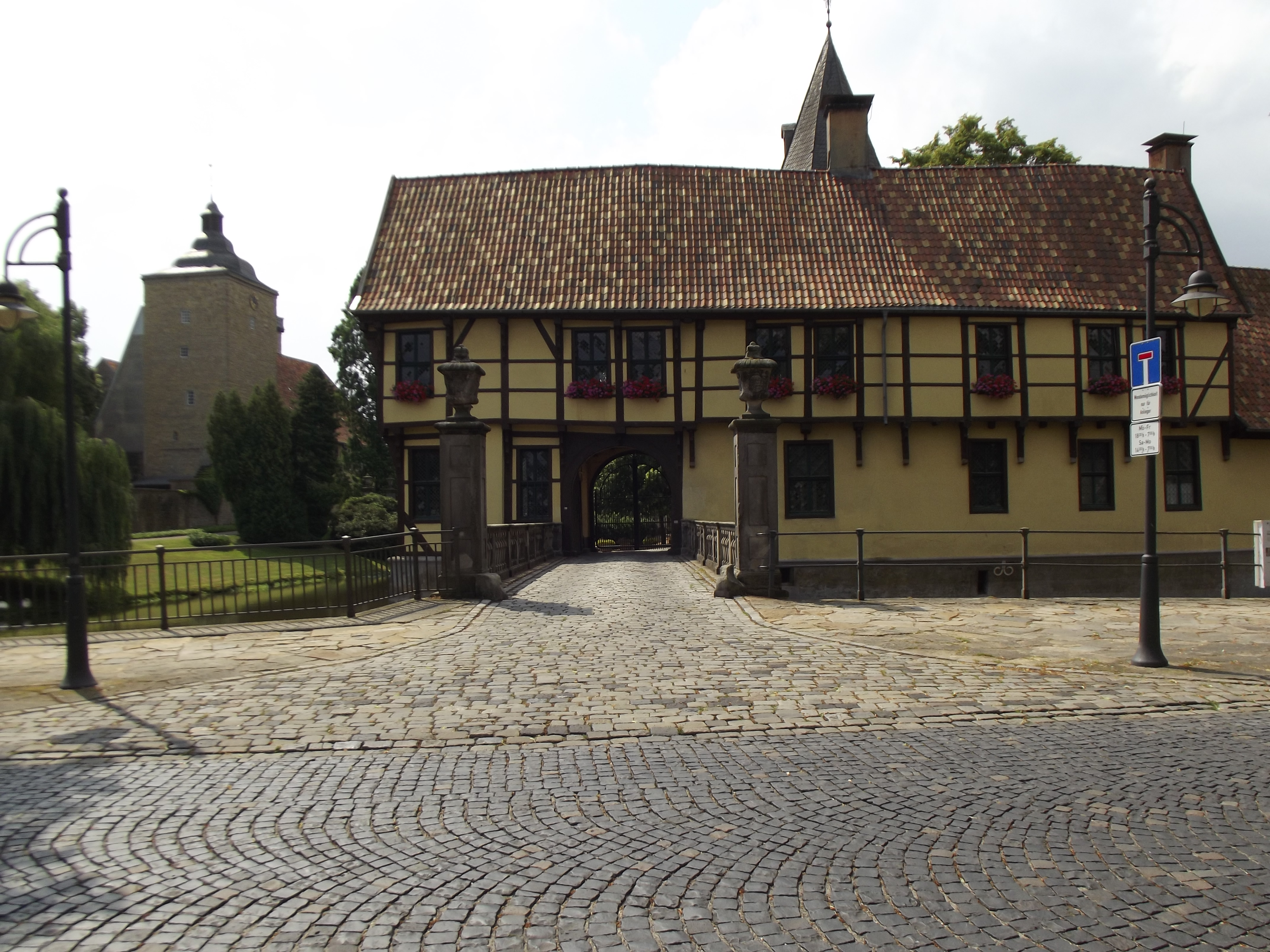
Entry to Steinfurt Castle

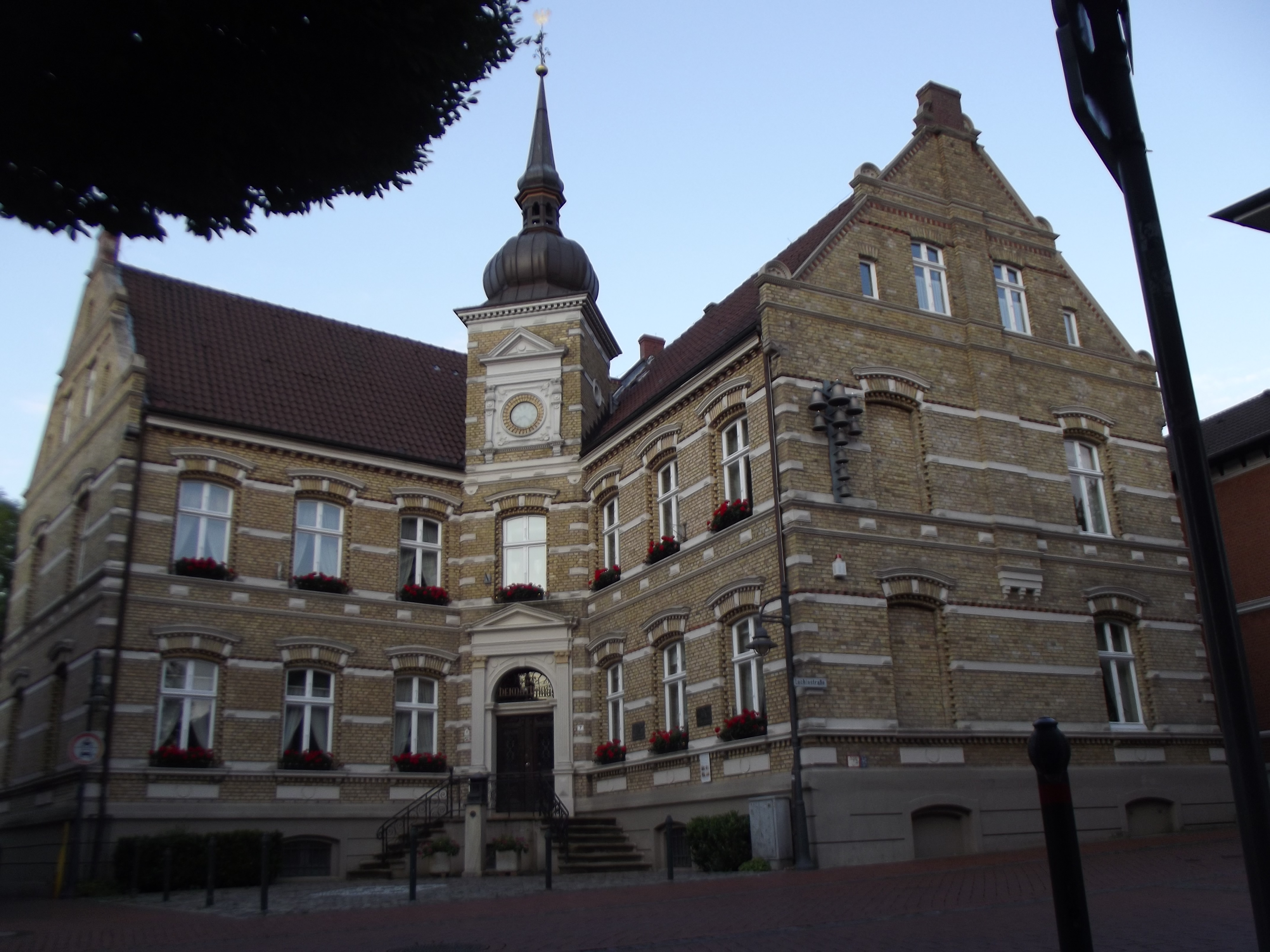
Local museum in Borghorst

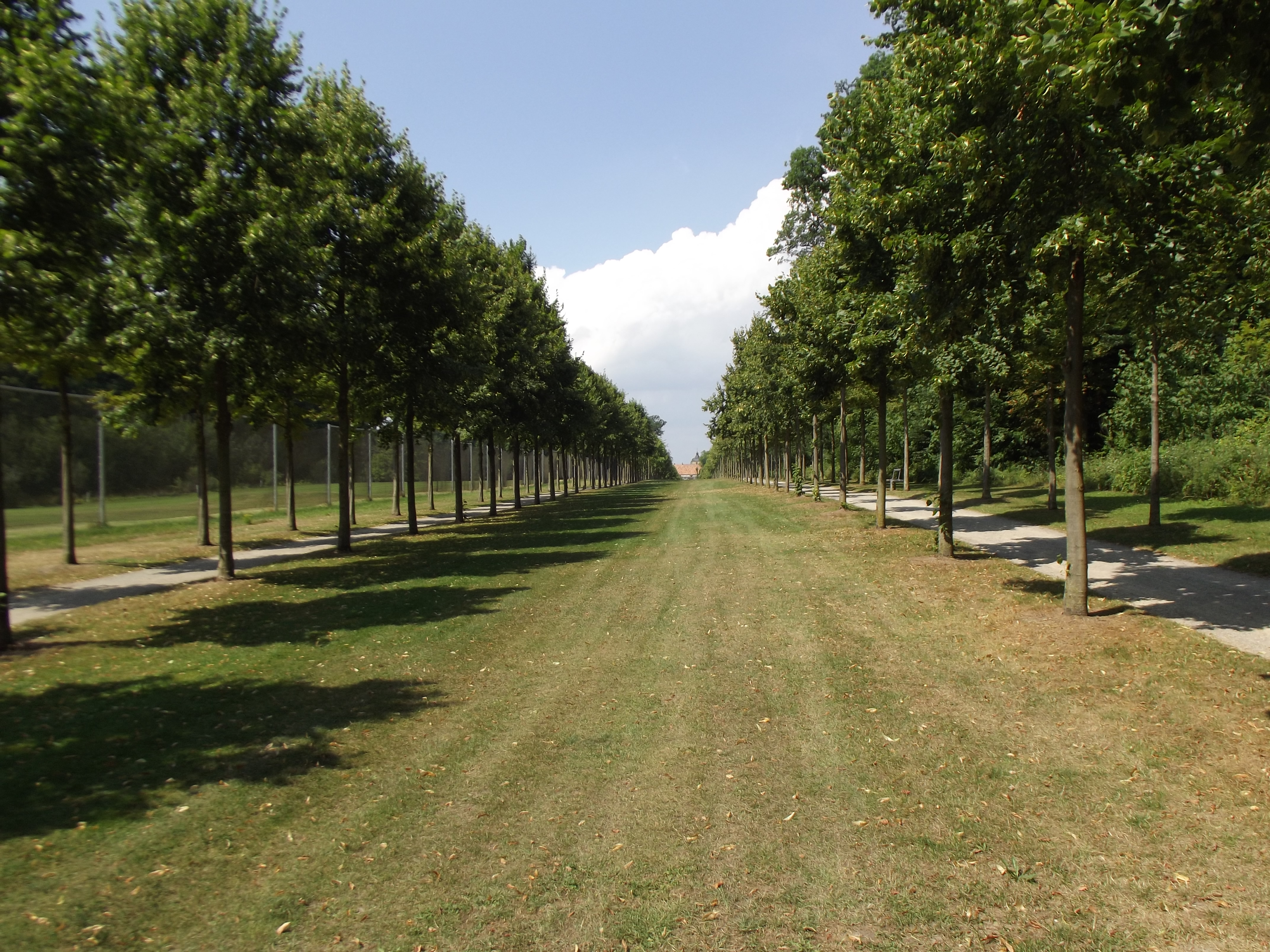
Old Bagno Avenue leading to the Castle

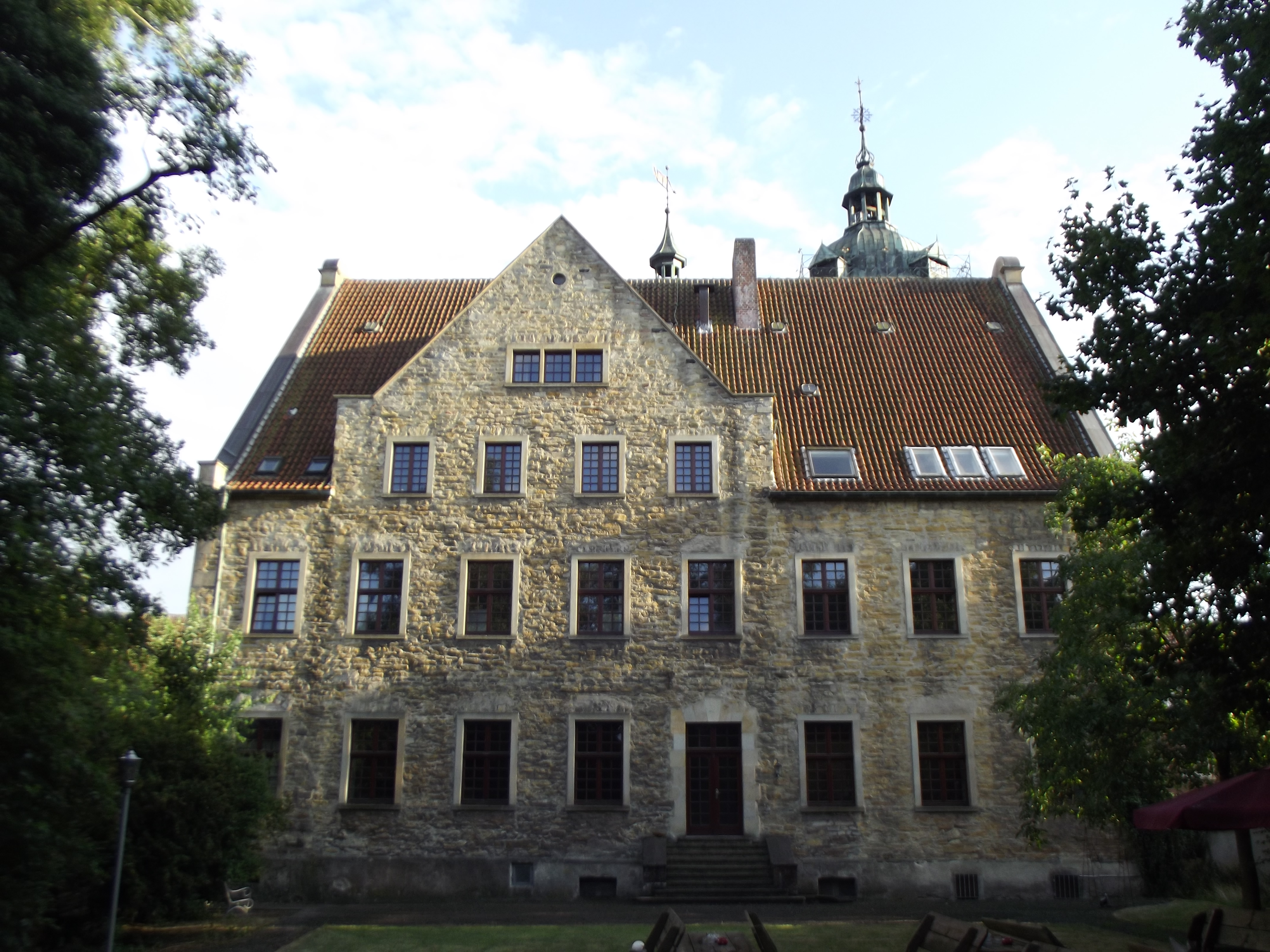
Hohe Schule (inner yard) in Burgsteinfurt

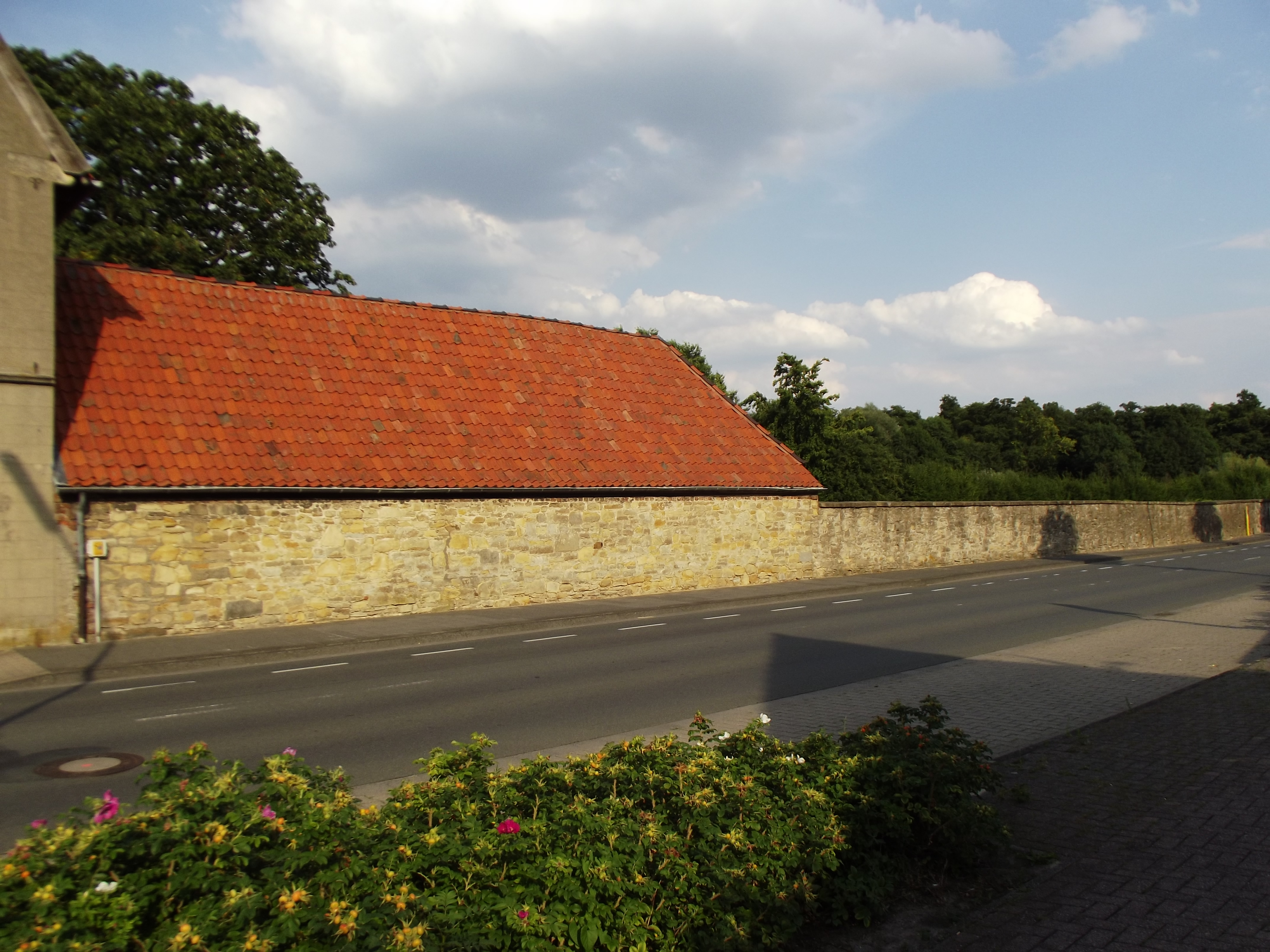
A still existing part of the historical wall of the Commandry (Order of Knights of St. John of Jerusalem)

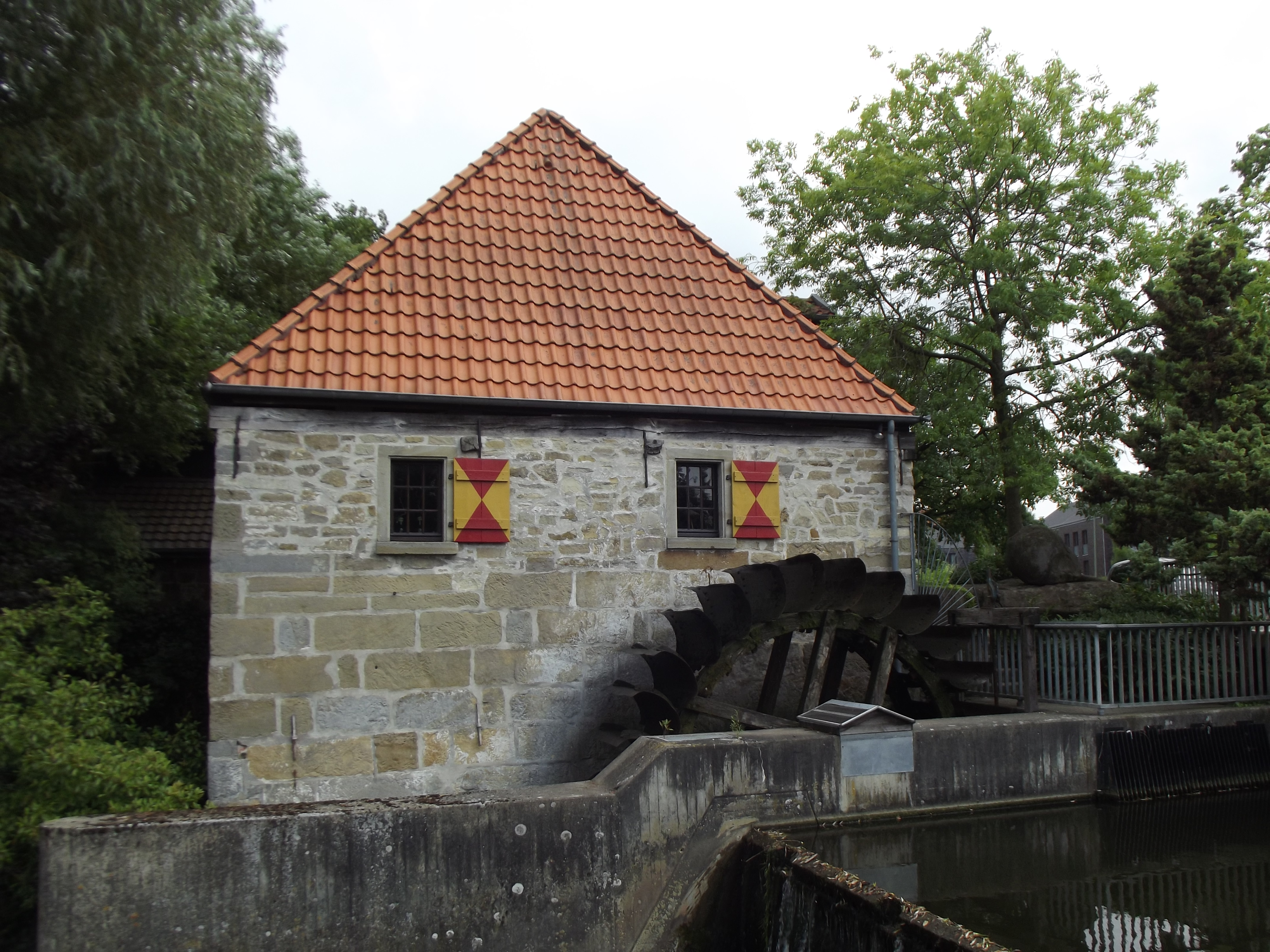
Niedermühle, a mill which supported the Schloßmühle

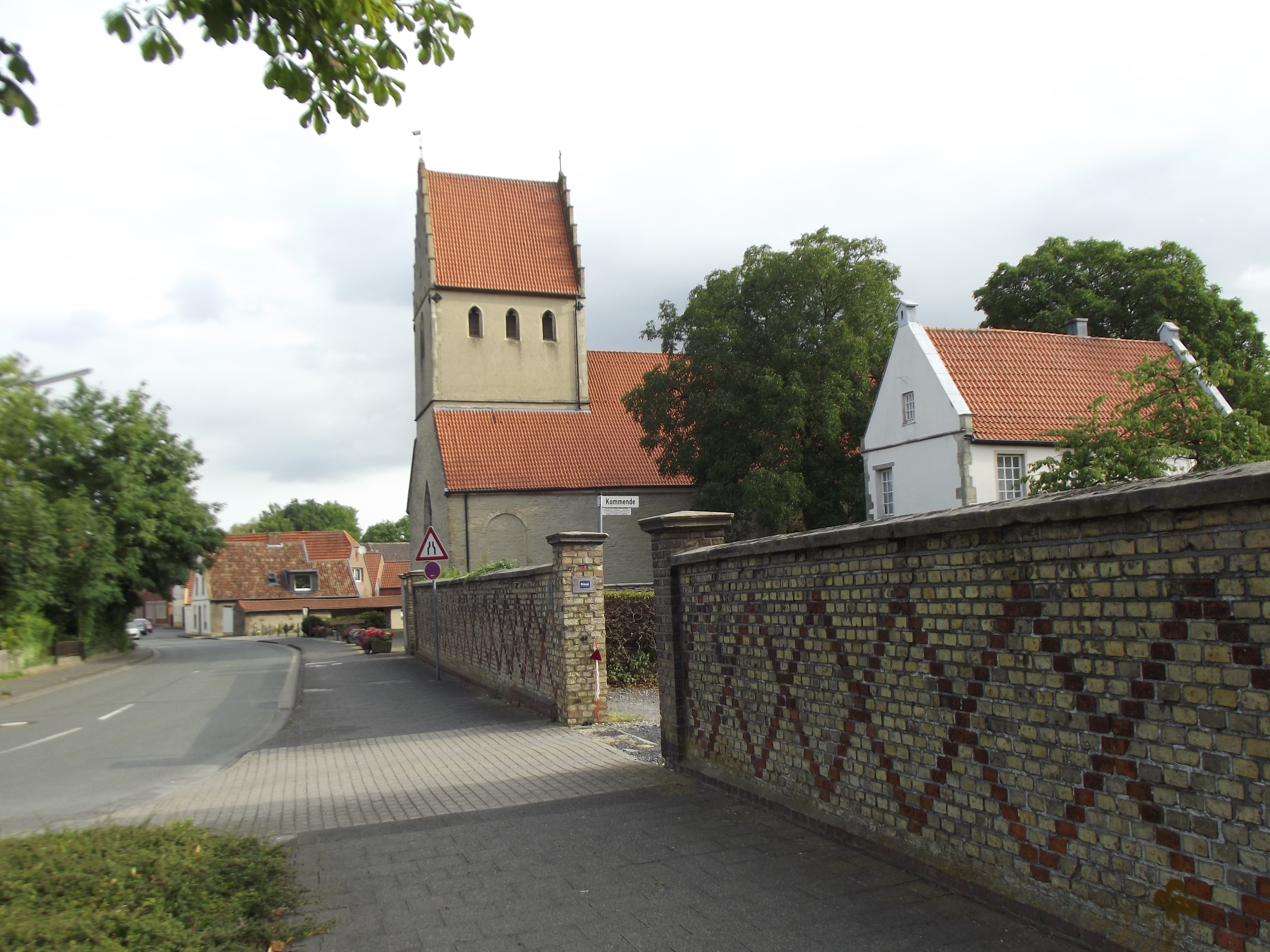
Protestant Church (Kommende)

The farming communities Hollich, Sellen and Veltrup are significantly older than Burgsteinfurt. The centre of Burgsteinfurt developed around the main farm of "Veltrup," which already existed in 890 as "villa veliun." Probably "villa veliun" was the main homestead of a small settlement, which was located on the territory of today's inner castle ward. Back then there was a market square at the current castle's entrance, which later developed into the "Old Town" of today.

Another settlement not dated back precisely yet was found in the course of archeological excavations in the area of the contemporary "Steintorfeldmark." All three farming communities had their own sanctuaries in pre-Christian time. After the era of Christianization they built a church in honour of Irish missionaries, which was the predecessor of today's Great Protestant Church. The farming communities celebrate their own feasts and customs with their own special atmosphere up to now although they were incorporated into the city in 1939.

Steinfurt's name originates from an old stone passage (or "ford") across the river "Aa." This passage was probably located at today's crossways of "Wasserstraße" and "Europaring." Being a part of a military formation connecting east and west, it offered one of only few possibilities to cross the river with coaches. The authority controlling the "ford" was powerful, authorised to charge tolls, and fords were also places of commerce. In a document from 1129 there is the first reference to two noblemen "de Steinvorde" (of Steinfurt). They probably had a moated castle built in the place of the main farm of Veltrup near the "ford" in order to control it.

The first rival was the Ascheberg clan living in a castle near today's road to Emsdetten, the old road of army and commerce to Münster and other eastern Germanic areas. There was a permanent war between the House of Ascheberg and the House of Steinfurt. In 1164 the Ascheberg clan is said to have destroyed the castle of the Steinfurt clan while the latter were on a trip to Cologne. After their return to Steinfurt they satisfied their desire for revenge and destroyed the castle of Ascheberg.

The noblemen of Steinfurt put forward a liberal settlement policy offering tradesmen, craftsmen and other citizens favourably situated houses near the "ford." In return they had to provide currency, wax or poultry and the old farming community "Villa Veliun" turned into a market square. In a document from 1338 the settlement is named "unse Stat to Stenvorde" (our city of Stenvorde). From 1816 up to the administrational reform in 1975 the city was called "Burgsteinfurt" and now there is just the city of "Steinfurt" uniting the two parts – Burgsteinfurt and Borghorst.

The Knights of St. John of Jerusalem was a religious and military order of striking importance for Steinfurt, which came to Burgsteinfurt sometime in the 13th century. The knights were given several manors around Steinfurt. Next to the major church the "Knights" founded their settlement called "Kommende" in 1244 of which most of the old buildings have survived until today.

From the 12th century on there was another settlement developed in the neighbourhood of the "Kommende," which is now the district of Burgsteinfurt called "Friedhof" (free area).

The wealth of the Order of St. John grew continuously. The noblemen gave them authority to supervise the major church, including the prerogative to appoint clergymen and to manage its funds. Additionally they accepted donations of several rich farms as well as possessions in the surrounding area. The settlement of the Knights of St. John of Jerusalem in Steinfurt, which was the first settlement of the order in Westphalia, became the biggest one in the region. In Münster they also founded a branch settlement. The Knights of St. John and the "Friedhof" (cemetery)-district formed an important unity. The "Friedhof" (free zone)-district was an independent area outside Steinfurt with its own civil rights. The name "Friedhof" doesn't refer to a cemetery, but reminds the reader of a pre-Christian sanctuary, which was located in the place of today's "Great Church." A person reaching this holy place was free; even criminals could not be punished here. In 1347 Steinfurt was granted town privileges. A hundred years later the County of Steinfurt was integrated into the community of counties immediate to the Empire, so that Steinfurt was only subordinate to the Emperor of Germany. Nevertheless, the ambitions of Münster kept growing. The self-government of Steinfurt had always annoyed the bishop of Münster.

But Steinfurt prepared itself. The citizens built walls, ramparts, ditches and so on at their own expense. A complete wall around the city was put up. This fortification consisted of the city wall, the inner moat, the rampart, the outer moat and a forward wall. The course of this fortification can be traced in today's cityscape. It develops around the old city centre from the "Schüttenwall" via the "Wilhelmsplatz," the "Kalkwall," the "Stampenwall" and the "Neuen Wall." The small lanes "Türkei," "Löffelstraße," "An der Stadtmauer," "Drepsenhoek" and "Viefhoek" run parallel to the old city wall.

Additionally four city gates were built: "Kirchpforte," "Rottpforte," "Steinpforte," and "Wasserpforte." There was only a small gate for pedestrians southward to the castle in the "Burgstraße." The road to Borghorst was built in the 19th century, when the ancient fortification had almost vanished. The "Friedhof"-district had its own fortification – secluded by its own city gate "Blocktor." The old guarding plans of Steinfurt showed the names of citizens who had to "tho wake und to yse," i.e., to guard the fortification and keep them clean and to de-ice them. In winter, when the moat was frozen, they had to break up the ice to guarantee the security of the city. Therefore, the citizenship was divided into three boroughs – the so-called "Eise" (Kirchsträßner Eis, Steinsträßner Eis, Wassersträßner Eis).

Simultaneously the city became more prosperous. In 1421 Eberwin I von Götterswick, who ruled Bentheim and Steinfurt since Steinfurt's dynasty was extinct, donated the town hall with market stalls of butchers and with a set of scales to the city. All citizens became more and more self-confident. As the Great Church was located outside the fortified city, they built a new Small Church from 1471–1475, on the foundation walls of the poorhouse of the Holy Spirit; until 1807 the annual election of the council took place there on 7 January. Later the Counts of Steinfurt conferred the right to build, and the right to put taxes on routes and beer to the city authorities. In 1561 the citizens proudly built their new town hall, resembling the town hall in Münster, on the foundation walls of the old market hall. This town hall was located at the crossroads of the three main streets from Münster (Wasserstraße), from Coesfeld (Kirchstraße) and from Schüttorf (Steinstraße).

During the aftermath of the Reformation Count Arnold II converted for his wife's sake to Lutheranism. This caused tensions with the order of the Knights of St John of Jerusalem, which resulted in the assault on the Great Church on 25 January 1564 (Steinfurt Reformation Day). While the count was asleep, the Great Church was taken. From this time on, only Lutheran church services were held in the Great Church and even today the date is known as the "Robber-Feast." The noble family converted collectively to the Calvinistic Church and stayed alert. From 1591 to 1593 Count Arnold founded a special type of university known as "Hohe Schule," which was a Protestant institution opposing the Catholic Münster.

Unlike universities recognised by the German Emperor or the Pope the "Hohe Schule" mustn't award doctorates. Still this oldest of all Westphalian universities attracted students and scientists from all over Europe; the city became wealthy and famous throughout Germany and the neighbouring countries. Especially Protestant Dutch students appreciated the Hohe Schule. Professor Conrad Vorstius taught there from 1596 until 1605 before he was chosen to become successor of Jacobus Arminius at the Leiden University. Some professors built renaissance-style houses, two of which can still be viewed at the old market square. The Count of Steinfurt even provided cover to Calvinists and Mennonites, who usually came from wealthy families and, therefore, brought many economic resources and also education to Steinfurt. Thus Steinfurt became and remained a Calvinistic-Mennonite island in the centre of Catholic Münsterland for a long time.

But all the prosperity vanished in the Thirty Years' War. The Black Death as well as mercenaries from all over Europe looting the city frightened off many citizens who emigrated in particular to the Netherlands. At the end of the war a great deal of houses was destroyed. Only a minority of citizens still lived in town. Yet even in the post-war period Burgsteinfurt remained lively. In 1660, Prince-Bishop Bernhard von Galen of Münster occupied the town and even ignored judicial orders by the Reichskammergericht, the highest court of the Holy Roman Empire at that time. He even enforced the right of Catholics to perform the mass in the Great Church. The occupation stopped in 1716 because an agreement was reached. Shortly after that a Catholic baroque church was built in Burgsteinfurt. Furthermore, the county of Steinfurt proved to be liberal towards Jews. In 1662 the Count of Steinfurt licensed one of them to live and work in Steinfurt in accordance with his religion. Even though the citizens originally objected to the settlement of Jews, the Jewish community grew successively.

A more peaceful period of time began. Moats and walls were flattened and the resulting new land was given to the citizens for cultivation. Count Charles Paul Ernest planned increasing the economic power of the city. Inspired by several journeys to foreign countries he decided to build an amusement park east of the castle – the "Bagno" (Italian: il bagno = bath, spa) – based on French blueprints.

His heir Louis William Geldricus Ernest of Bentheim and Steinfurt expanded the originally little lake and reconstructed the garden in English style. In the time to follow many exotic buildings were put up, among these a so-called Chinese palace, an Arion ship, a Gothic house and the artificial ruin of a castle. Today there are only the concert hall, the island with the ruin and the New Guardhouse ("Neue Wache") left, but the "Bagno" has become established as an attraction for tourists.

At the same time the conflict between Count and city came to a climax. Following a legal dispute the Count of Steinfurt deposed the city council, arrested the mayor and deployed 150 French soldiers. He banned the town guards and, consequently, the town guard festivals called "Schützenfest." Later peace was restored through a settlement and a new council was elected. In 1806 the French allocated Steinfurt to the grand duchy "Berg." Steinfurt was now the head of the "arrondissement" and therefore its administrational centre. Thus, a decision had been made which is still valid today. Steinfurt is still the seat of the local government, the local district court and the financial authorities. The French also closed the "Kommende."

The decision of the French to choose Burgsteinfurt as an administrational centre was simultaneously the start of the industrial era. Due to poor harvests and subsequent common impoverishment many citizens left for the United States. Especially in Ohio and Missouri old "Stemmerter" (= citizens of Steinfurt) left their traces at that time. Meanwhile, Steinfurt was linked to the existing road networks. Old city gates were torn down to establish new housing estates beyond the old city boundaries. In 1851 the first house was built outside the ancient urban area. Railroad connections were established from Steinfurt to Münster, Enschede, Rheine, Oberhausen and Borken. Textile industry, tobacco factories and the brewery "Rolinck" gained recognition. The predominantly Protestant population grew significantly. An almost forgotten fact is that a first line of telegraphs existed between Burgsteinfurt and Borghorst. Christoph Ludwig von Hoffmann, MD, scientist and personal physician of the Count, installed the optical telegraph.

At the end of World War II, the town was in the British Zone of Occupation. The townsfolk were noted in the British press for their silent but palpable resentment of the British occupation. On 29 May 1945 the people of the town were ordered to watch an Allied documentary film detailing Nazi mass murder.

== Population ==
Historical population

Year	Pop.	±% p.a.
1965	28,593	—
1970	29,763	+0.81%
1975	31,370	+1.06%
1980	32,315	+0.60%
1985	31,441	−0.55%
1990	31,484	+0.03%
1995	33,268	+1.11%

Year	Pop.	±% p.a.
2000	33,955	+0.41%
2005	34,560	+0.35%
2010	33,901	−0.38%
2015	33,682	−0.13%
2020	34,431	+0.44%
2025	34,822	+0.23%

Source: Landesdatabank Nordrhein-Westfalen

== Historical monuments ==
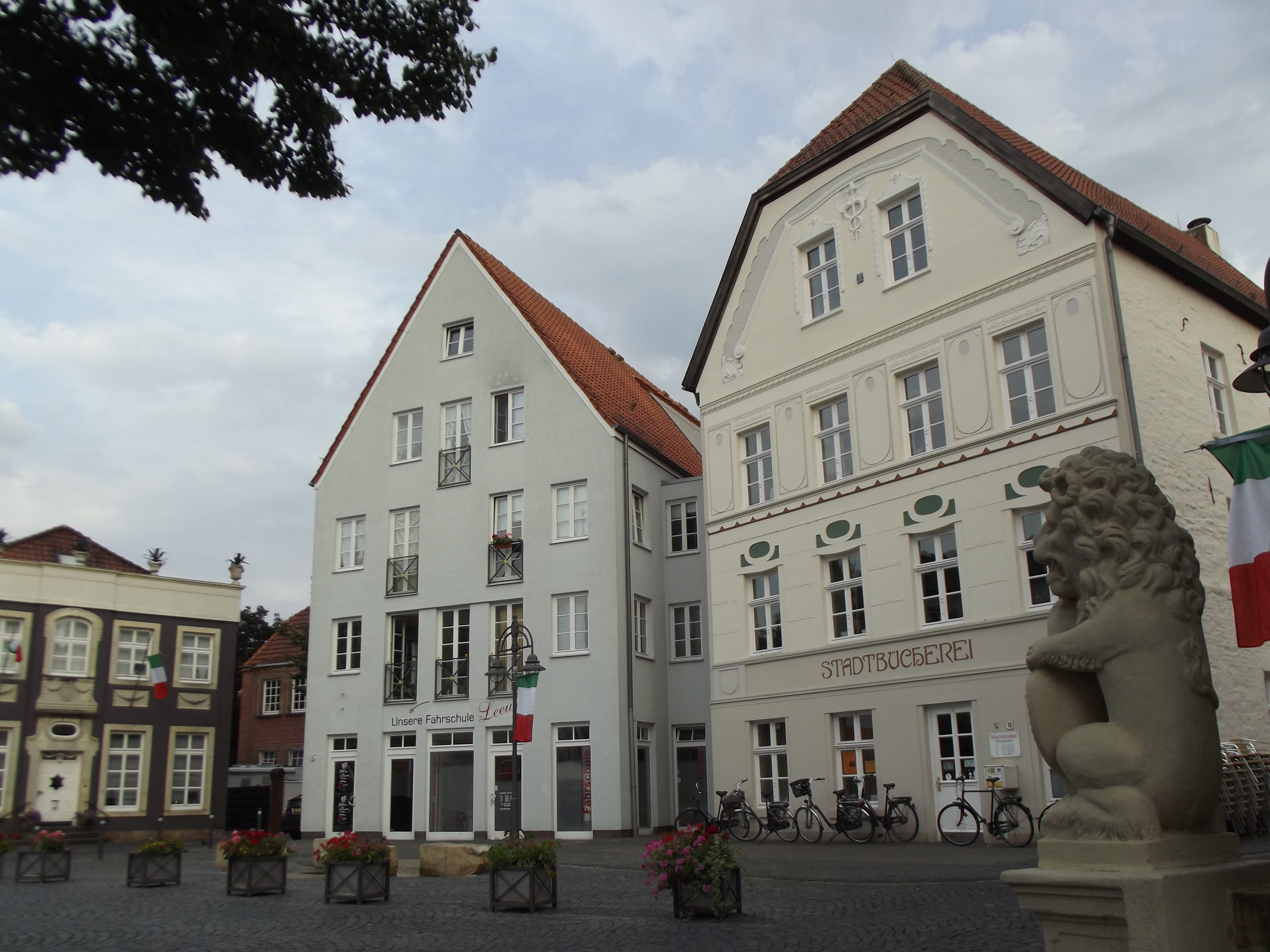
Market square Burgsteinfurt

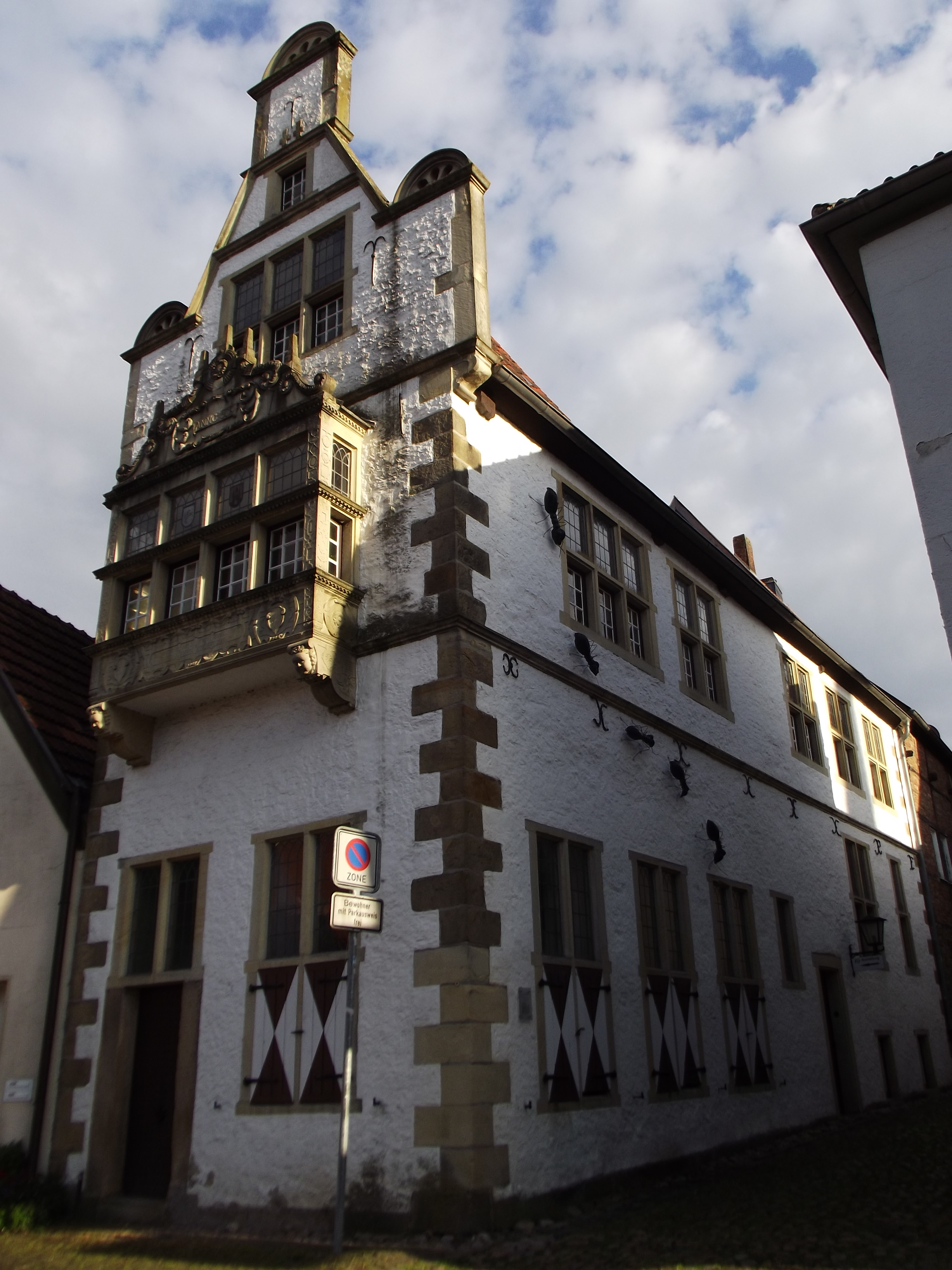
Huck Beifang House

The Old Town Hall built in 1561 indicates by its Renaissance gable the self-confidence of the economically successful citizens of Burgsteinfurt. The swinging contours of the gable lead to seven peaked pyramids and the crest of the city. The turret of the town hall is supported by one big beam, called "Kaiserstiel" (i.e., emperor's beam). The Gothic hall below on the first floor contained the city guard and the prison for a very long time. On the second floor there is the big assembly hall of the city council and the chamber with the fireplace.

At the beginning of the Hahnen street is the "Huck-Beifang-Haus." Eberhard Huck, the Count's financial administrator, had built this house as an annex to his wife's home in "Bütkamp 3." The proud owner noted on the bay in Latin: "Sunt hae structae aedes Eberhardie sumptibus Hucki. Ex his as superas sperat abire domos," which would be in English something like: "This house was built at the expense of Eberhard Huck. From here he hopes he will come into heaven one day." The bay is marked with the crest of the Huck family (Huck = hook) and Beifang family and the year 1607. The building, which in the meantime harboured the public library, serves now occasionally as an art gallery and a function hall for public lectures.

From here a narrow medieval lane, the "Kalkarstiege," leads to "Bütkamp." There are several classic buildings all at once: first the Haus Bütkamp 3 on the left side and the house called Ackerbürgerhaus, a building inhabited by a citizen who was a farmer as well as a citizen of the town and who had his land outside the city walls. On the right side is a very graceful half-timbered house with two storeys located. It dates from the beginning of the 17th century and is called Kornschreiberhaus ("Bütkamp 14"). The second floor and the third floor extend into the street. Thus the house offered more space. Michael Oeglein from Southern Germany's Swabia was the architect and initial owner of this house. He was in charge of collecting the duties and taxes the farmers owed to the Count. They delivered food grain ("Korn") and he had to keep records. Since "keeping records" is in colloquial German "(auf-)schreiben", his house was eventually known as "Kornschreiberhaus."

The tall building housing the "Stadtbücherei" (municipal public library) is known as "Weinhaus" (wine-house). It is the oldest building at the market square. Built around 1450 by the Count, it served as accommodation for his guests and later on for selling wine. Moreover, it demonstrated how the Count held sway over the town and its market square which symbolized the wealth and power of the citizens. Due to certain defects concerning the building's construction the roof had to be restored in 1490 already. The wall close to "Kirchstrasse" had to be rebuilt after the Thirty Years' War. And the stucco façade, a mix of Baroque elements and Art Nouveau dates back to 1912. Nowadays the house lodges a fireplace which was relocated from house "Markt 16." It shows Adam and Eve while Eve passes on the apple to Adam.

Close to the Wine-House there are two houses in Renaissance style. The house "Markt 18" was owned by the judge and law professor at the "Hohe Schule," Johannes Goddaeus, who had the house built on the foundations of a wine-shop. The house "Markt 16" was constructed by the Count's administrator Dr. Caspar Kestering and his wife Adelheid Huberts immediately after the Thirty Years' War in 1648. Their initials are eligible in the crest of the two lions in front of the door. In the past there was a tavern, the cellar of which still exists. During the Thirty Years' War the house was destroyed, but Kestering had a new house put up on the foundation of the old one in the style of the Dutch Renaissance.

Opposite to this house there is the House Pieter van der Swaagh, which was built in 1784 by judge Friedrich Houth in classicistic style. The flowerpots on the house with the artificial agaves probably derive from the Bagno.

The tour leads on to "Burgstrasse." The Count's the former "Kunsthaus" (House of Arts) deserves attention because more than a hundred years ago it was a unique museum of artwork, stuffed crocodiles and odd scientific instruments. At the end of "Burgstrasse" there is the "Schlossmühle" (castle mill) on the left and the castle itself on the right. There was a mill on this site already in the Middle Ages, today there is a café and a restaurant.

The Castle is one of Burgsteinfurt's most important buildings. Registered sightseeing tours are offered, but only a limited area is open for tourists because the castle is still inhabited by the noble family. A fortified castle was erected on a hill already dug up in the 10th century, but was destroyed in 1164 in a conflict with Ascheberg's nobility. The new facility contained an outer wall, the "Buddenturm," a tall tower for defence demolished in the 18th century, and the tower used for living with the Great hall. A rare construction are the two chapels built on top of each other and used as two-storeyed chapel. The auxiliary building ("Vorburg") of today in front of the main residence or "Hauptburg" comprises flats, garages, stables and farm buildings. In the middle there is a little Baroque "house" for a well, built by stonemason Johann Schrader.

From the castle and the market the former university building "Hohe Schule" can be seen. In order to oppose the activities of the Jesuits in Münster and "Münsterland," Count Arnold IV (1554–1606) founded a Calvinistic university, once the oldest university in Westphalia. Starting in 1591 the "Hohe Schule" offered courses in law, theology, medicine/physics, philosophy, history and rhetoric. Doctors’ degrees, however, were not awarded in Burgsteinfurt. The "Hohe Schule" was built in the Renaissance style and is crowned by two weather vanes that are marked with the crest of Count Arnold IV and his wife. Around the big tower runs a gallery, where people could make astronomical computations. At the beginning of the 19th century the "Hohe Schule" was closed. It was used then by French troops under Napoleonic rule, later on as the seat of a law court and as a prison.

From the "Hohe Schule" an alley branches off, the so-called Kautenstege, actually Kortenstege or "short way." At the beginning the old Geisthaus (House of the Holy Spirit) can be seen, the only surviving poorhouse of the city from the 15th century. In "Kautenstege" a memorial stone reminds the visitor of the Synagogue that once stood here and the Jewish citizens who were deported. The Synagogue was destroyed in November 1938. At the end of "Kautenstege" there is the Steinstrasse ("cobblestone street," in former times the only paved street in Burgsteinfurt); on the right side there is the old town hall, the starting point of the tour.

== Education ==
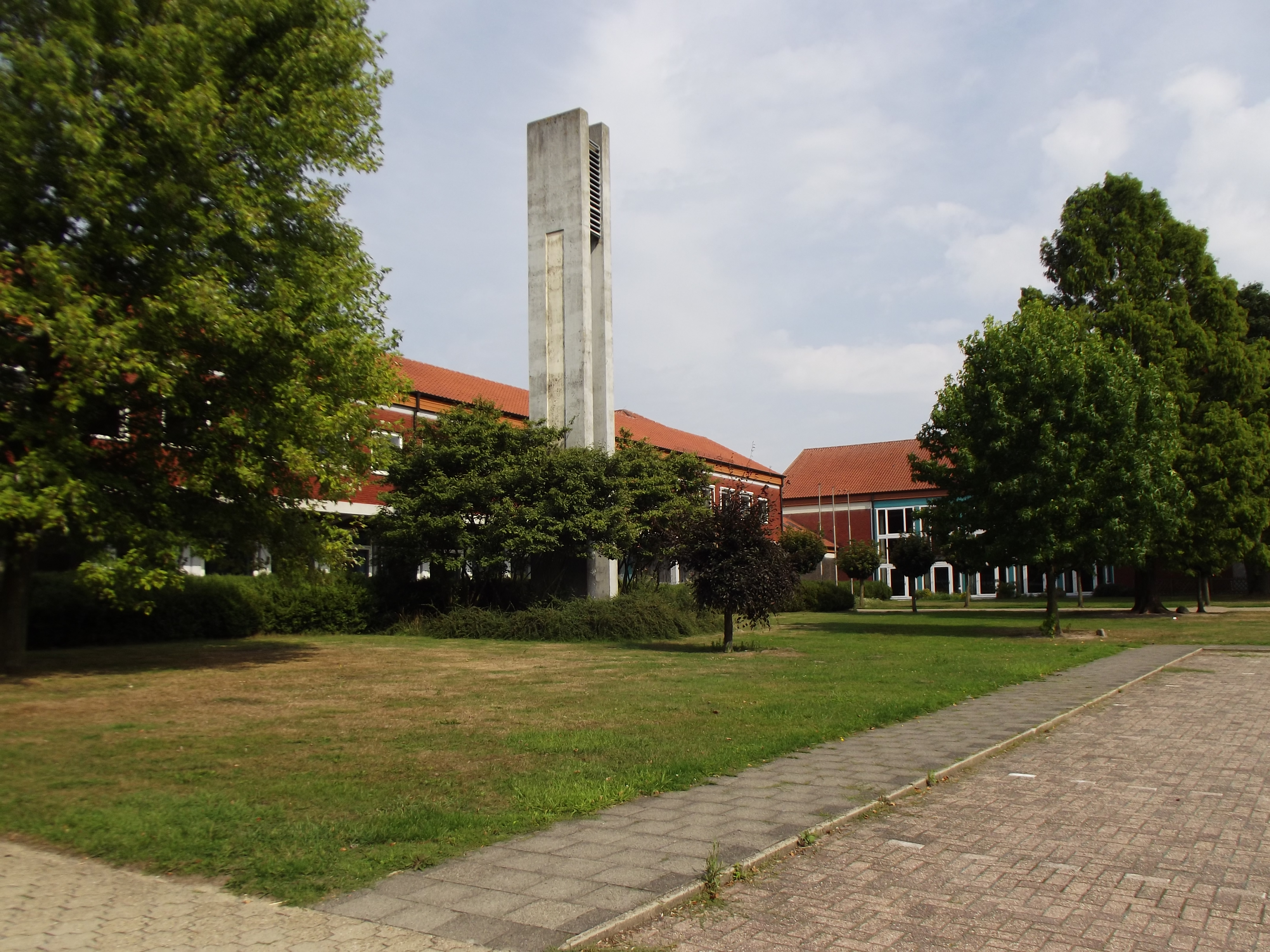
Gymnasium Arnoldinum

In Steinfurt there are a variety of schools and colleges, including two secondary schools, one of which is the "Gymnasium Arnoldinum," a descendant of the "Hohe Schule."

The engineering faculties of the University of Applied Sciences Münster (Fachhochschule Münster) are based in Steinfurt.

== Transport ==
=== Train ===
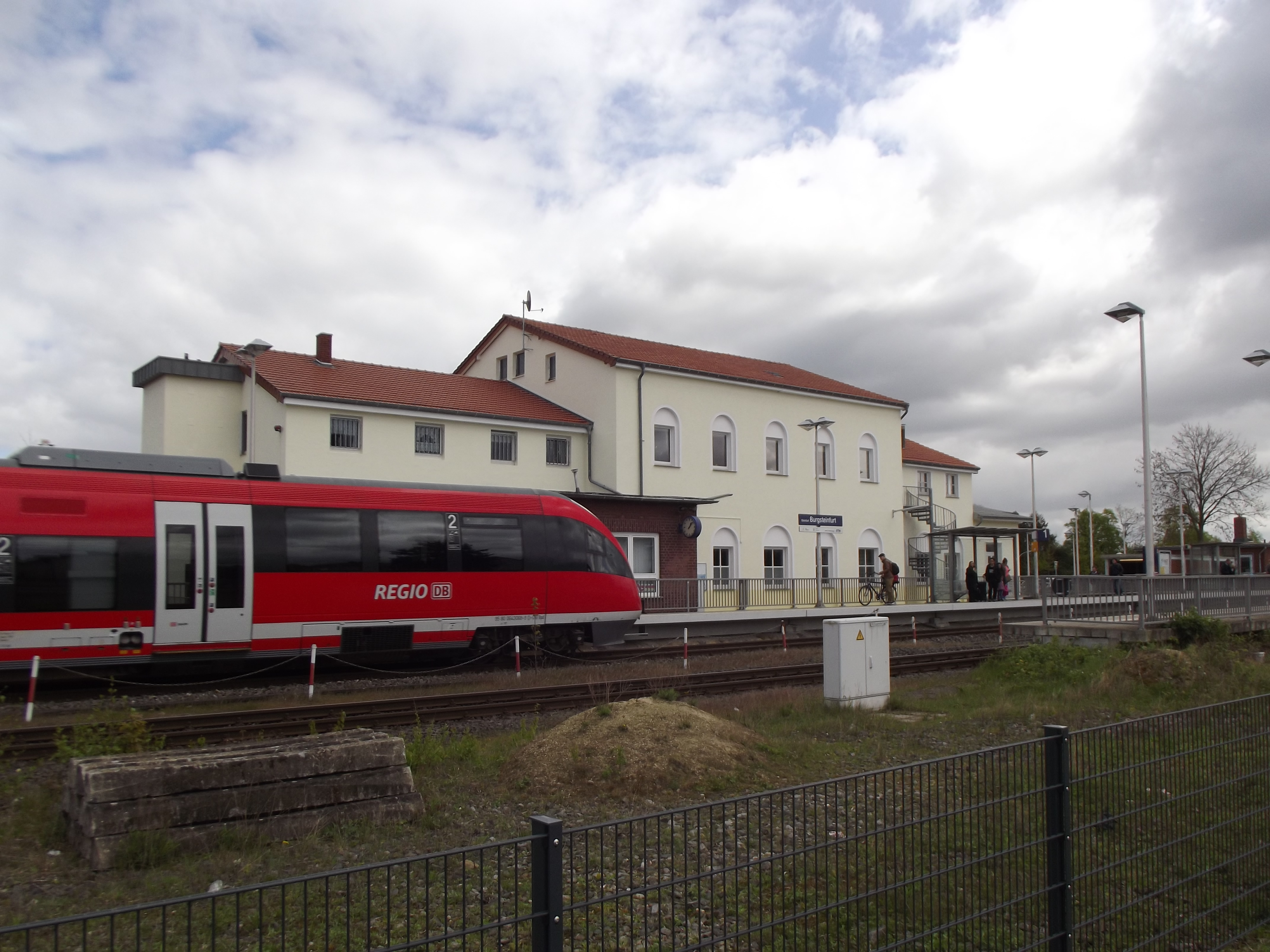
Steinfurt Burgsteinfurt station

Steinfurt-Burgsteinfurt station is located on the Münster–Enschede railway and has an hourly train service to Münster in one direction and to Enschede in the other direction.

=== Buses ===
Bus lines connect Steinfurt to Rheine, Emsdetten and Coesfeld

=== Bicycle ===
Bicycle paths lead to Metelen, Rheine, Horstmar and Münster.

== Twin towns – sister cities ==
Steinfurt is twinned with:

- Liedekerke, Belgium
- Neubukow, Germany
- Rijssen-Holten, Netherlands

== Notable people ==
- Alexander Hegius (c. 1439–1498), humanist, priest and member of the Brothers of Common Life
- Johann Friedrich Böckelmann (1632–1681), jurist and professor
- Louis William Geldricus Ernest, Prince of Bentheim and Steinfurt (1756–1817), nobleman
- Ludwig Wilhelm, Prince of Bentheim and Steinfurt (1812–1890), nobleman, Royal Hanoverian and Prussian Lieutenant General
- Alexis, Prince of Bentheim and Steinfurt (1845–1919), nobleman and statesman
- Levin Ludwig Schücking (1878–1964), anglist and Shakespeare researcher
- Heinz Baumkötter (1912–2001), SS leader and concentration camp doctor
- Paul Gauselmann (born 1934), founder and chairman of the company's group of companies of the same name
- Jutta Richter (born 1955), author of children's and youth literature
- Bertram Engel (born 1957), drummer
- Mikael Forssell (born 1981), Finnish footballer
- Peter Elkmann (born 1981), racing driver
- Lena Wermelt (born 1990), footballer
- Jannine Weigel (born 2000), German-Thai singer, actress and model

== Gallery ==
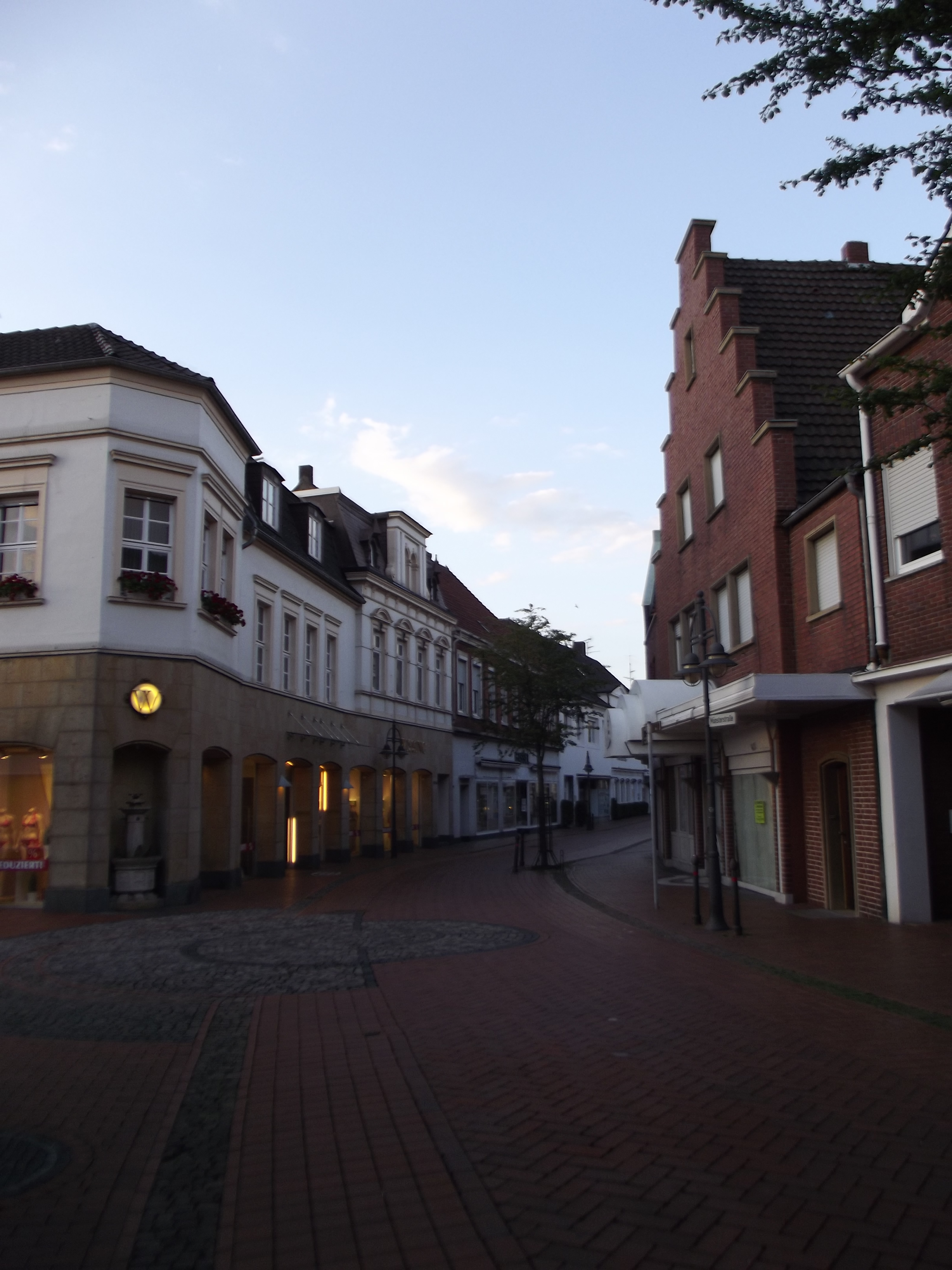
Old Town Borghorst

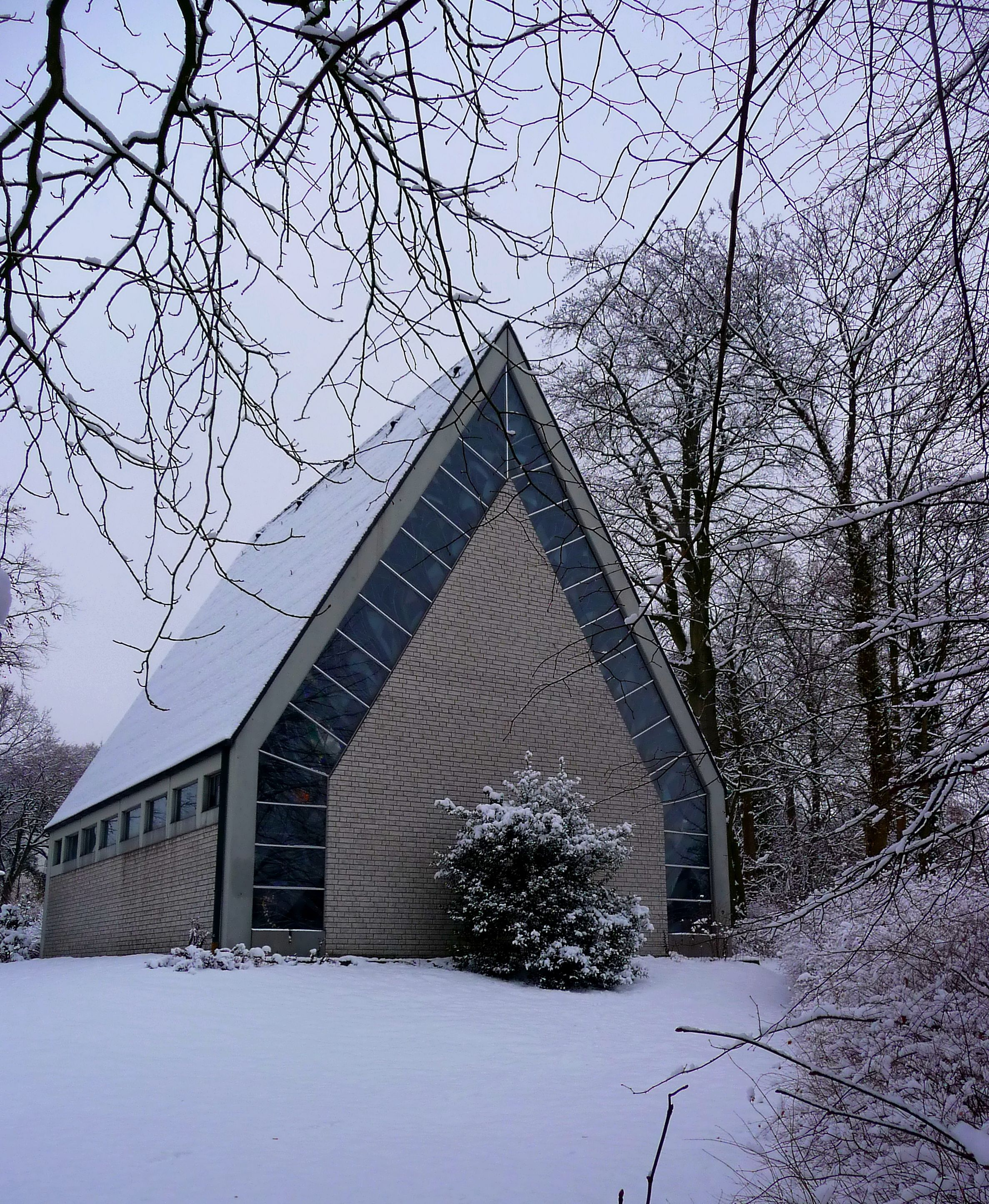
St. Johanneskirche SELK

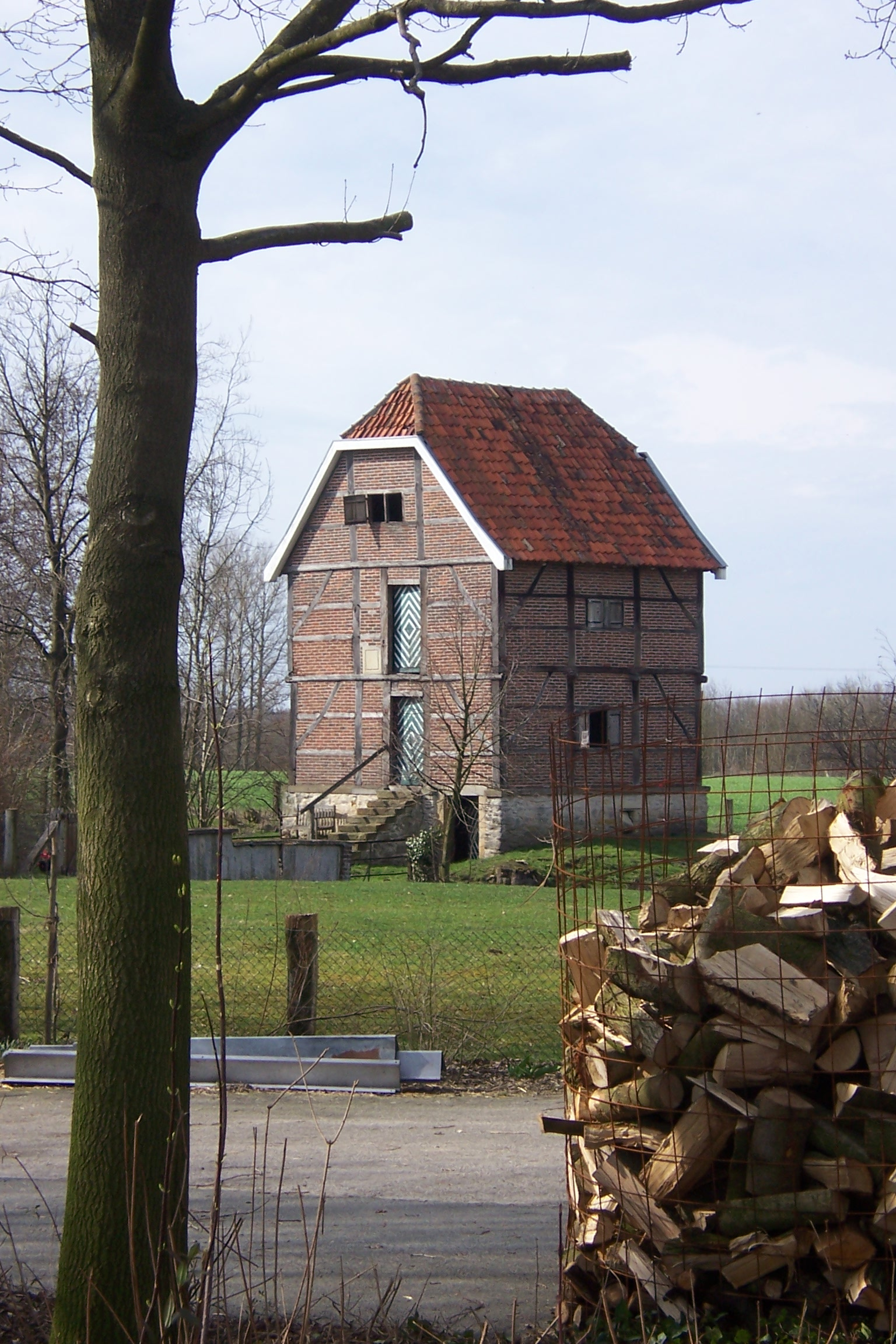
Speicherhaus in Wilmsberg

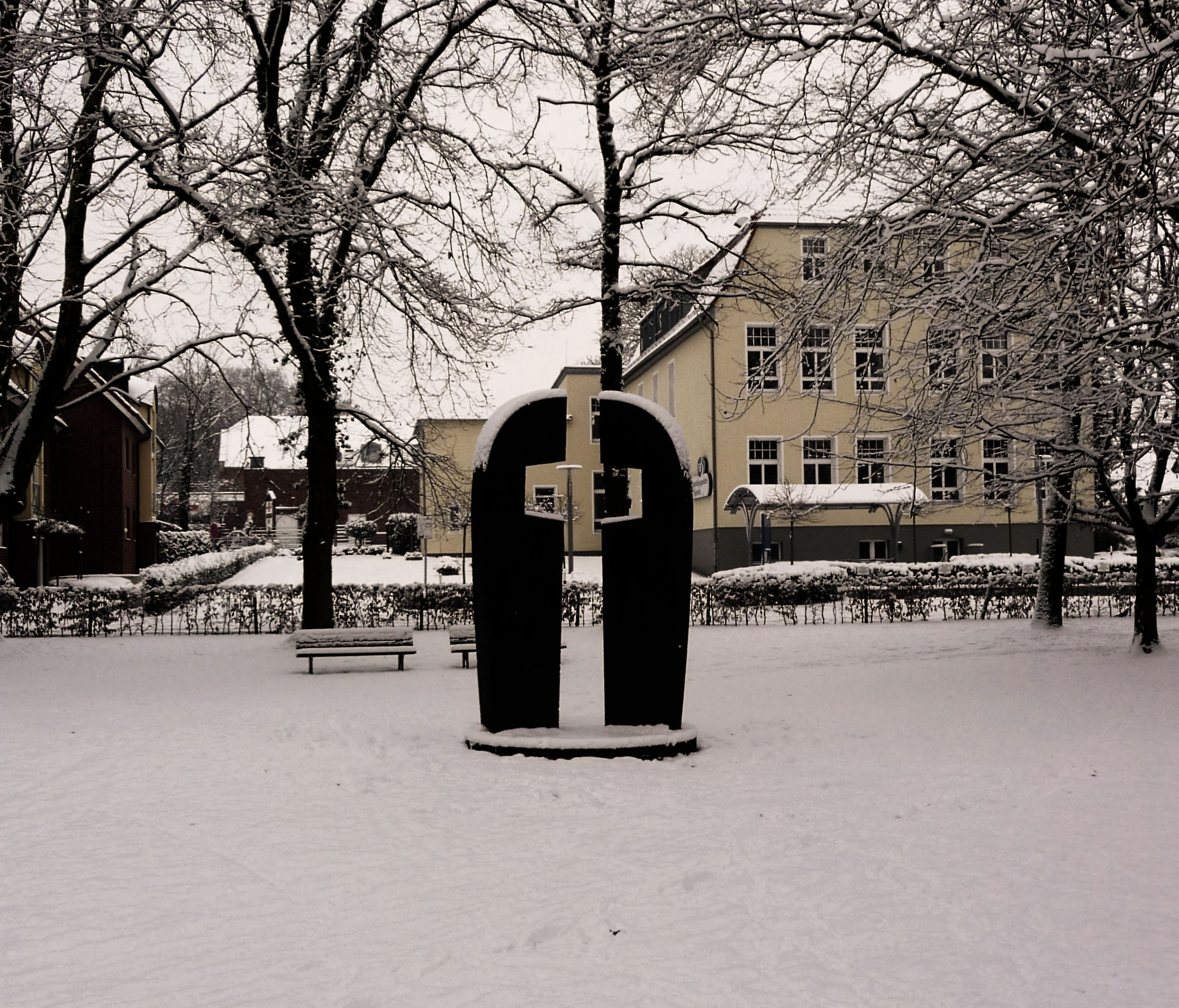
Urban Park Borghorst

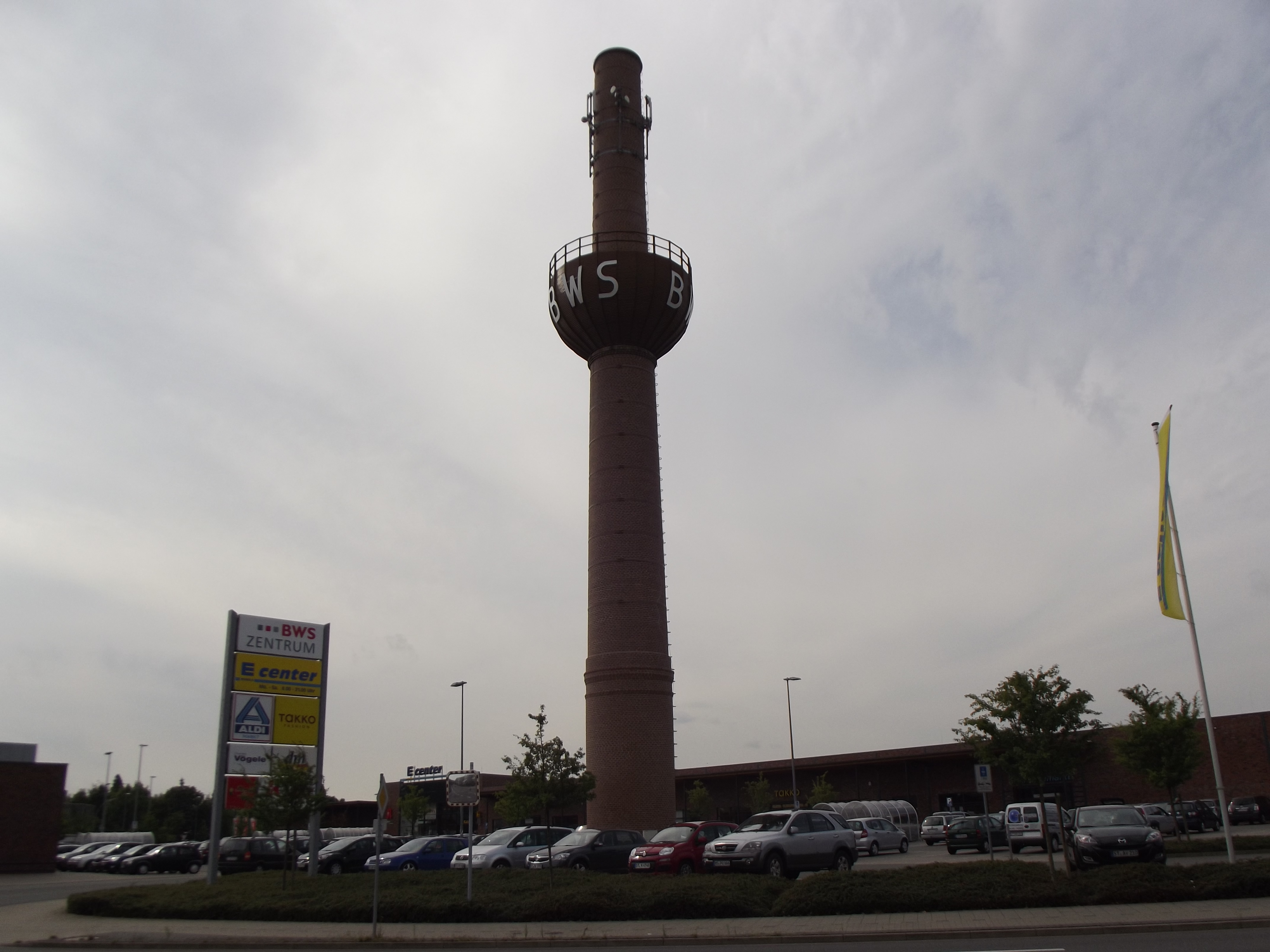
BWS shopping Centre

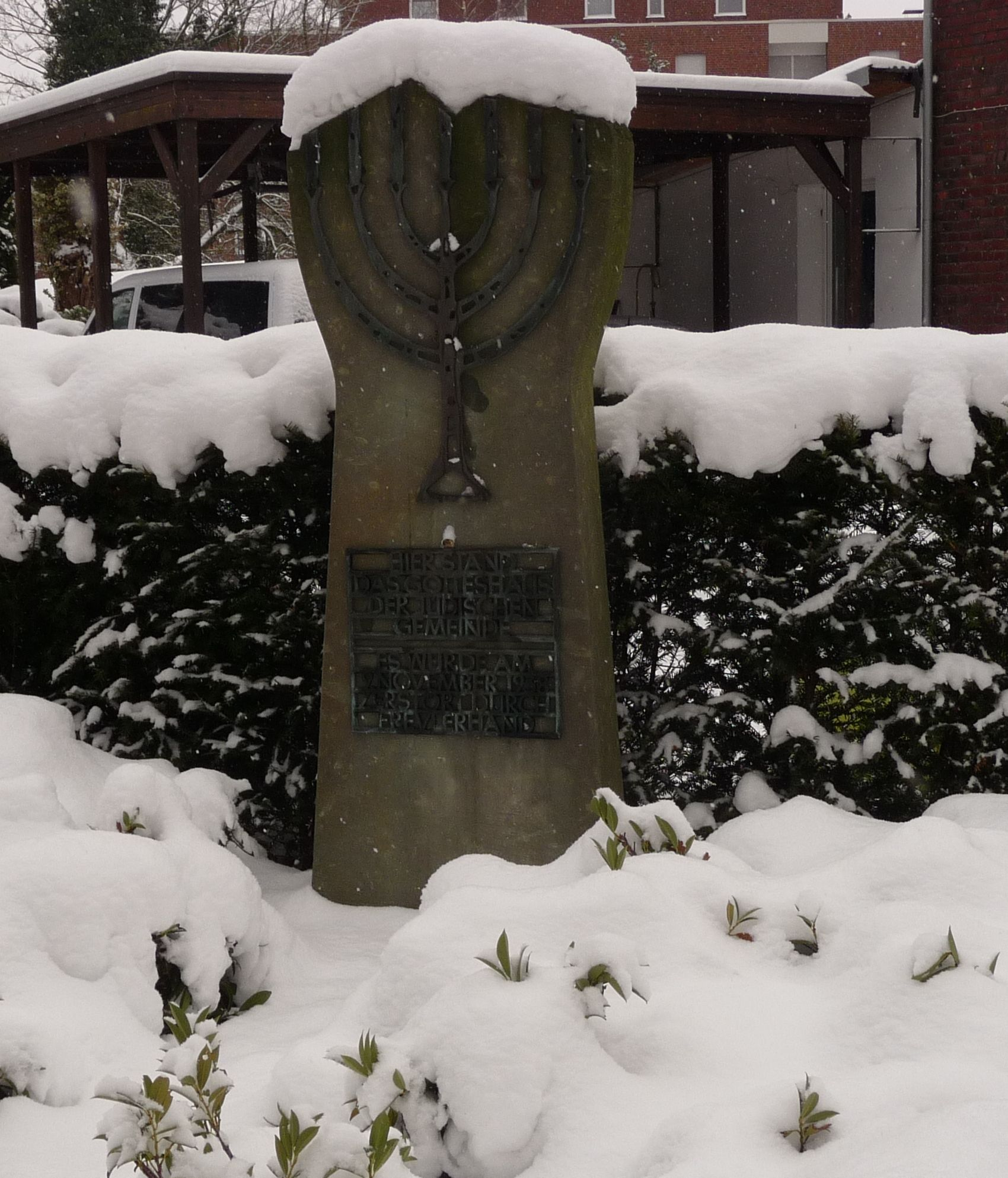
Borghorst Synagogue Memorial

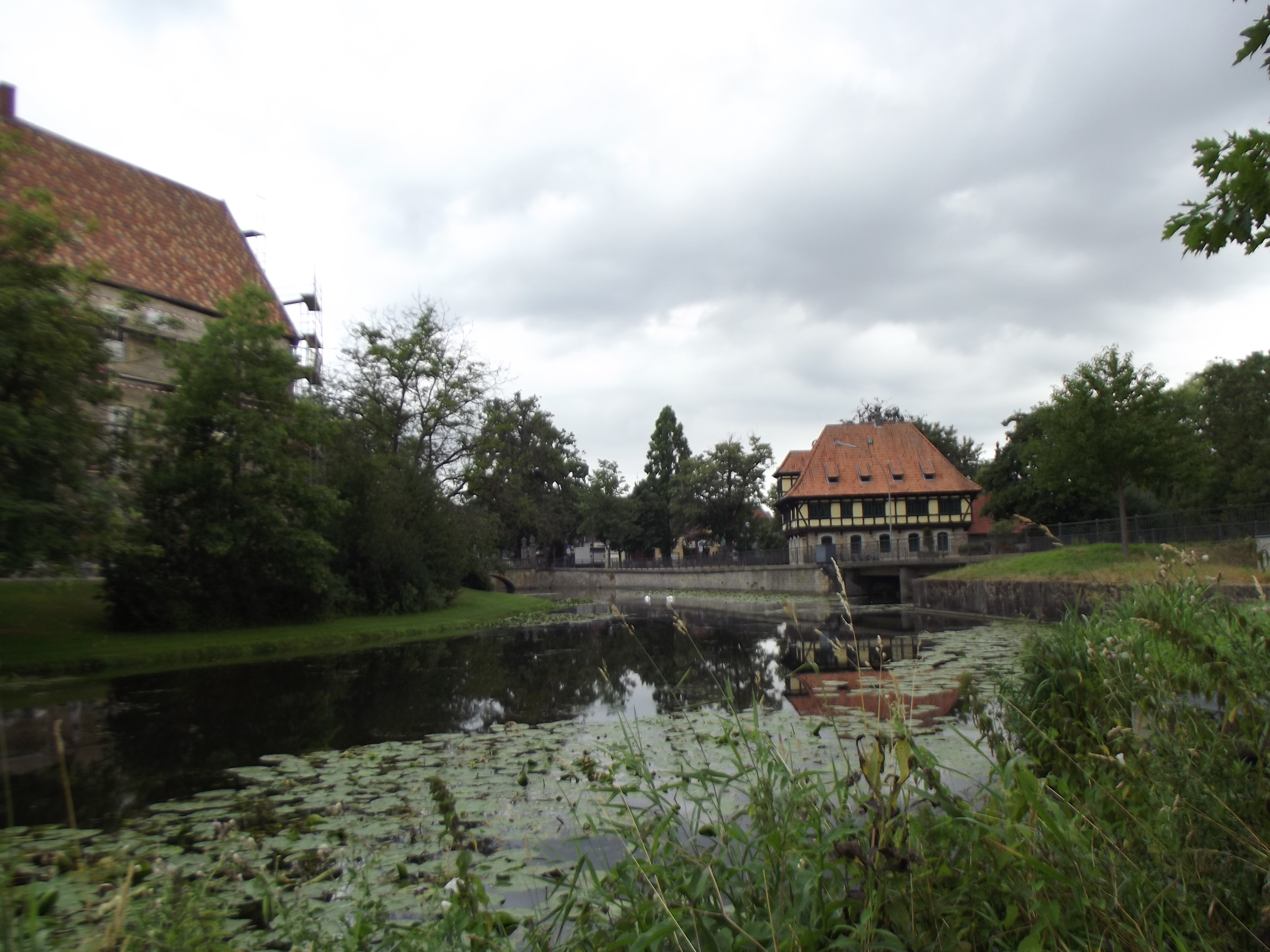
Castle moat

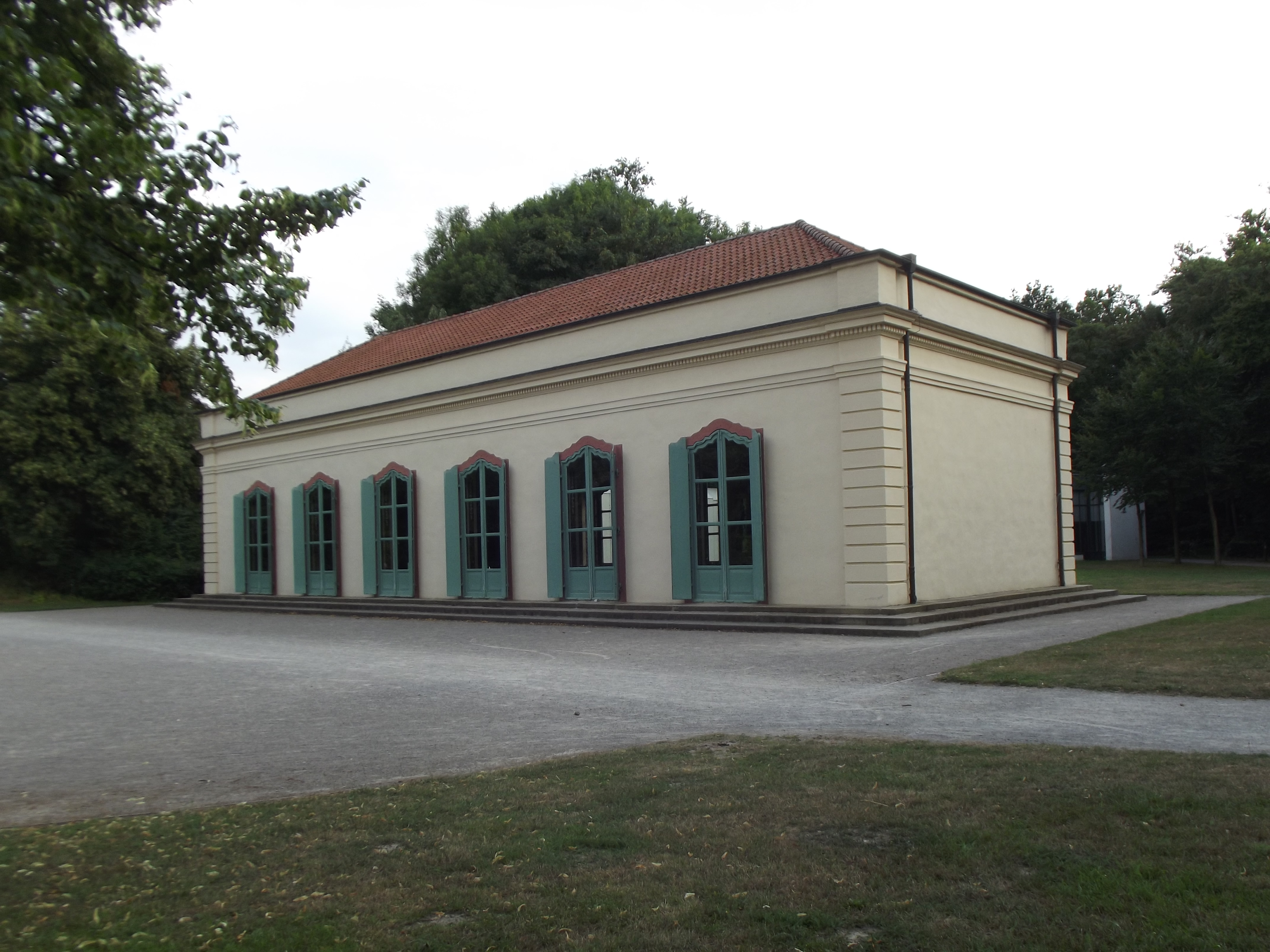
Bagno Concert Hall

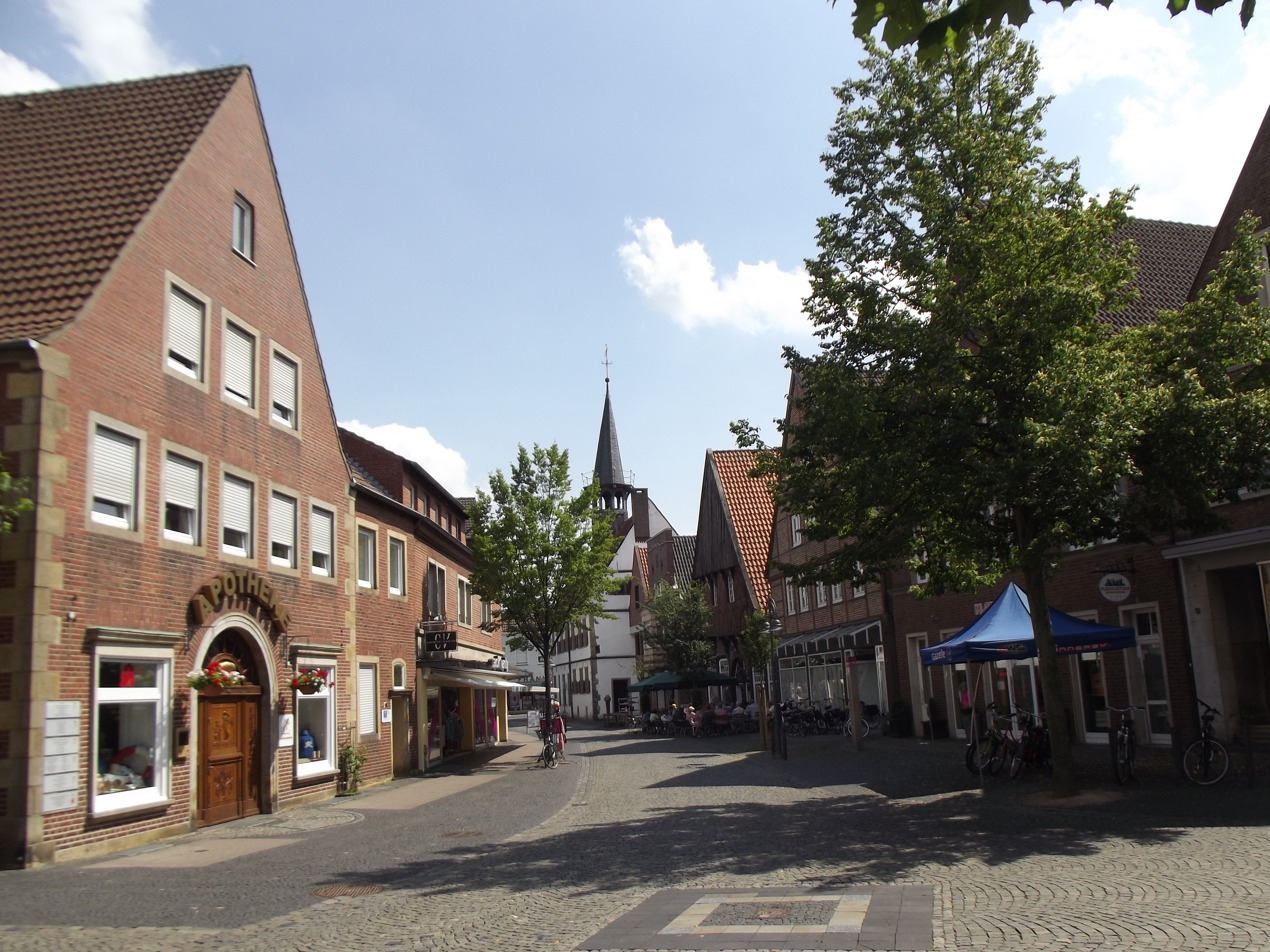
Historical Old Town of Burgsteinfurt

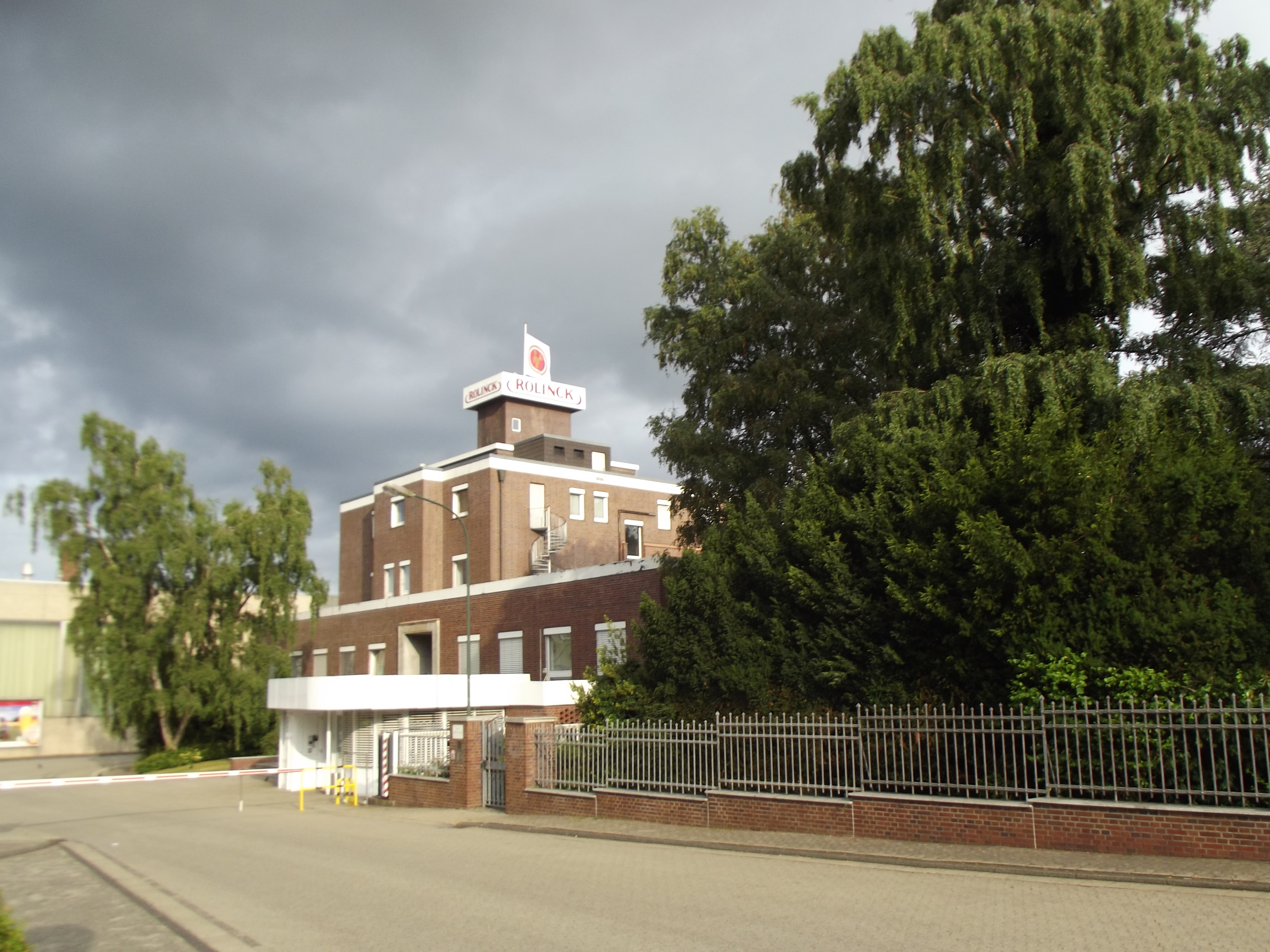
Rolinck brewery

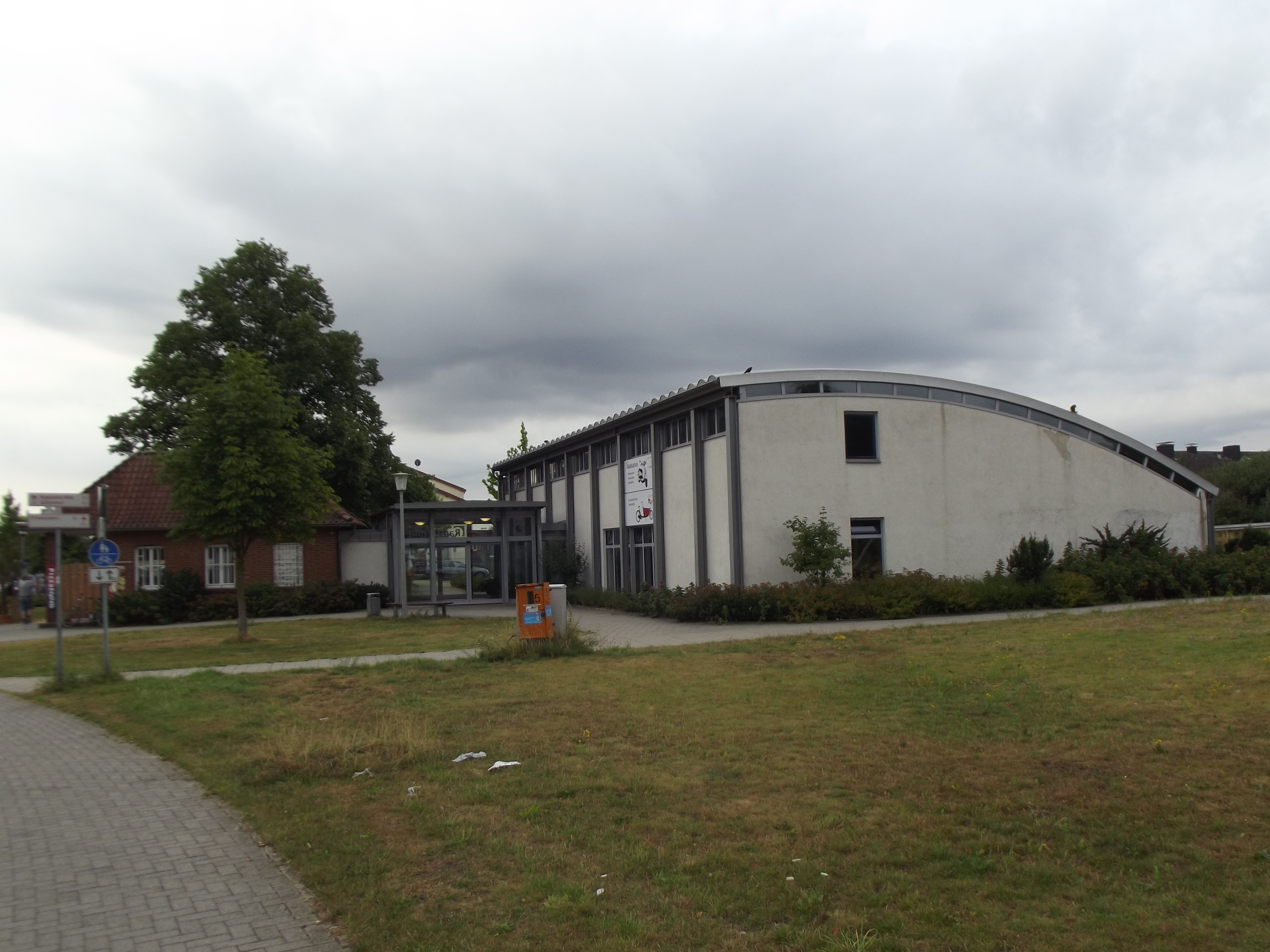
Steinfurt's bicycle station

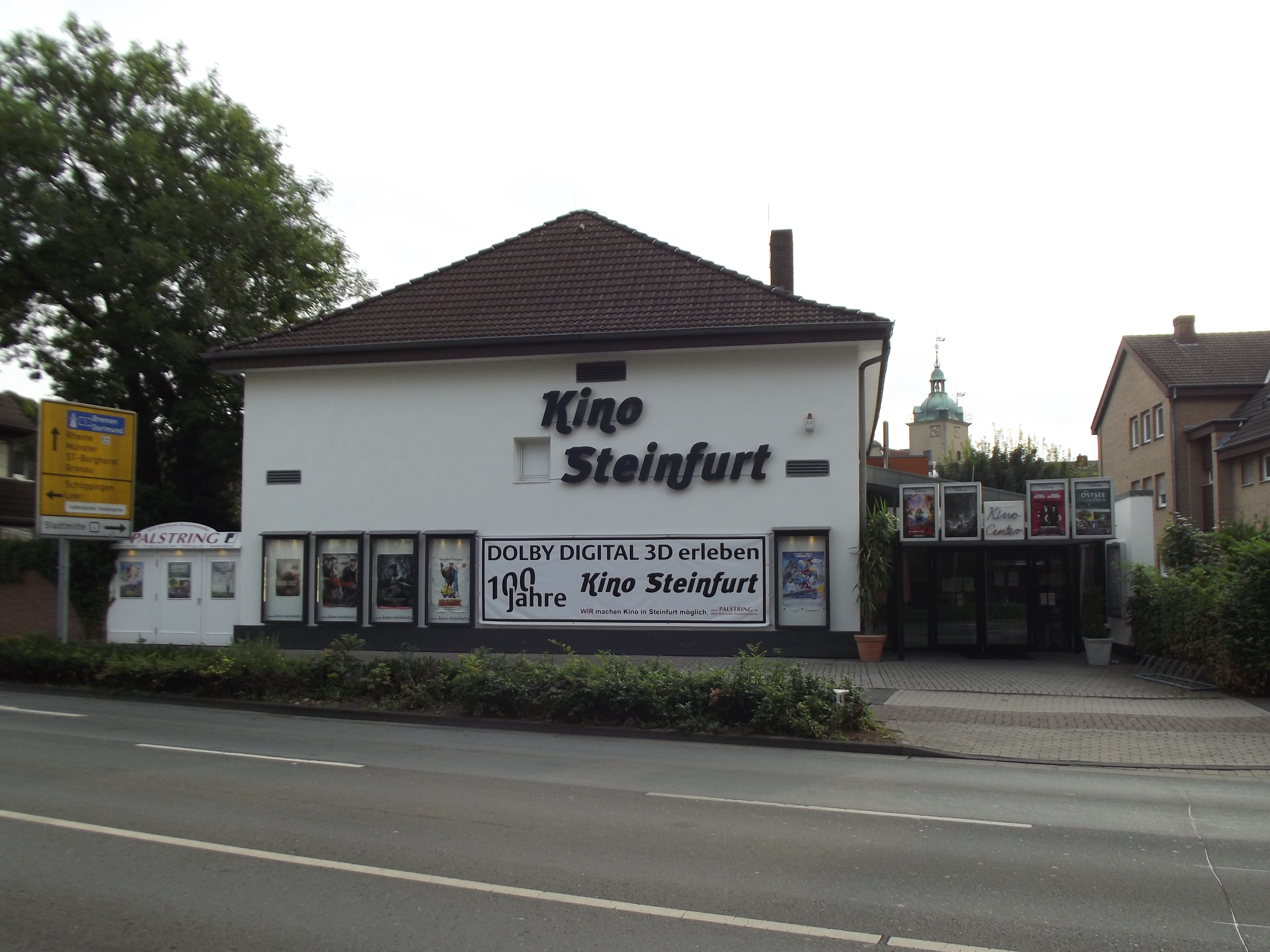
Cinema Steinfurt

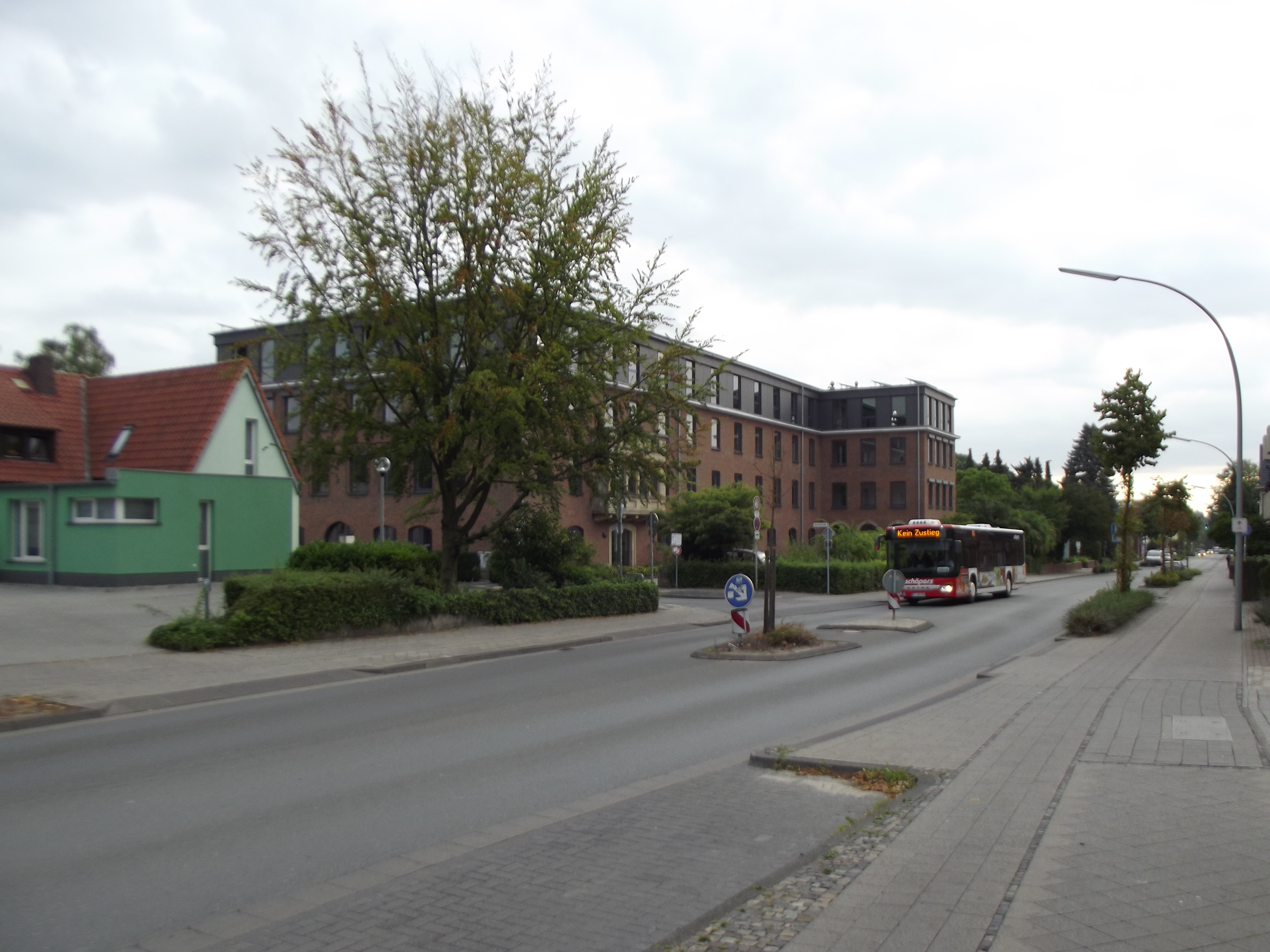
School of Economics

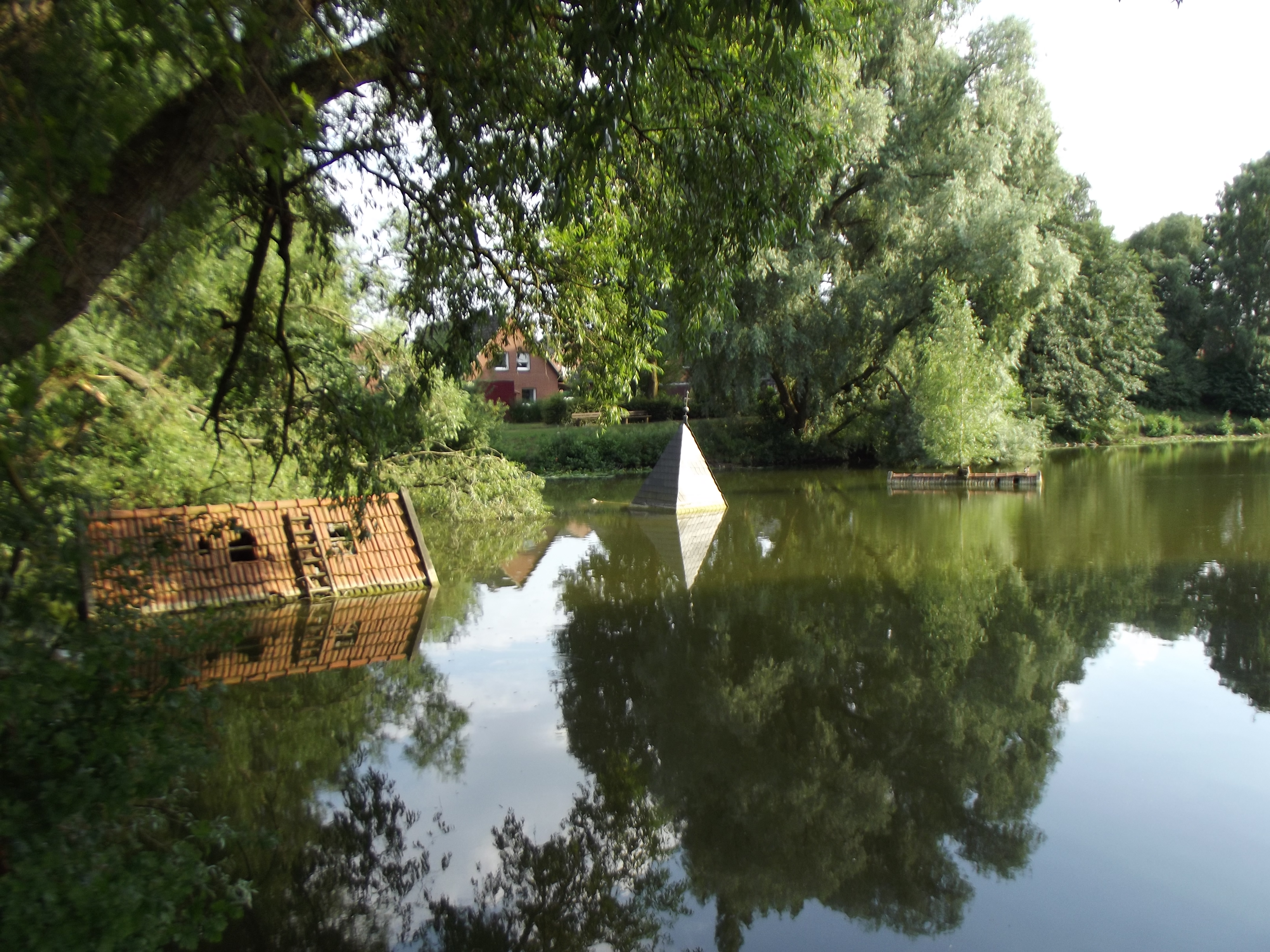
The Sunken Town

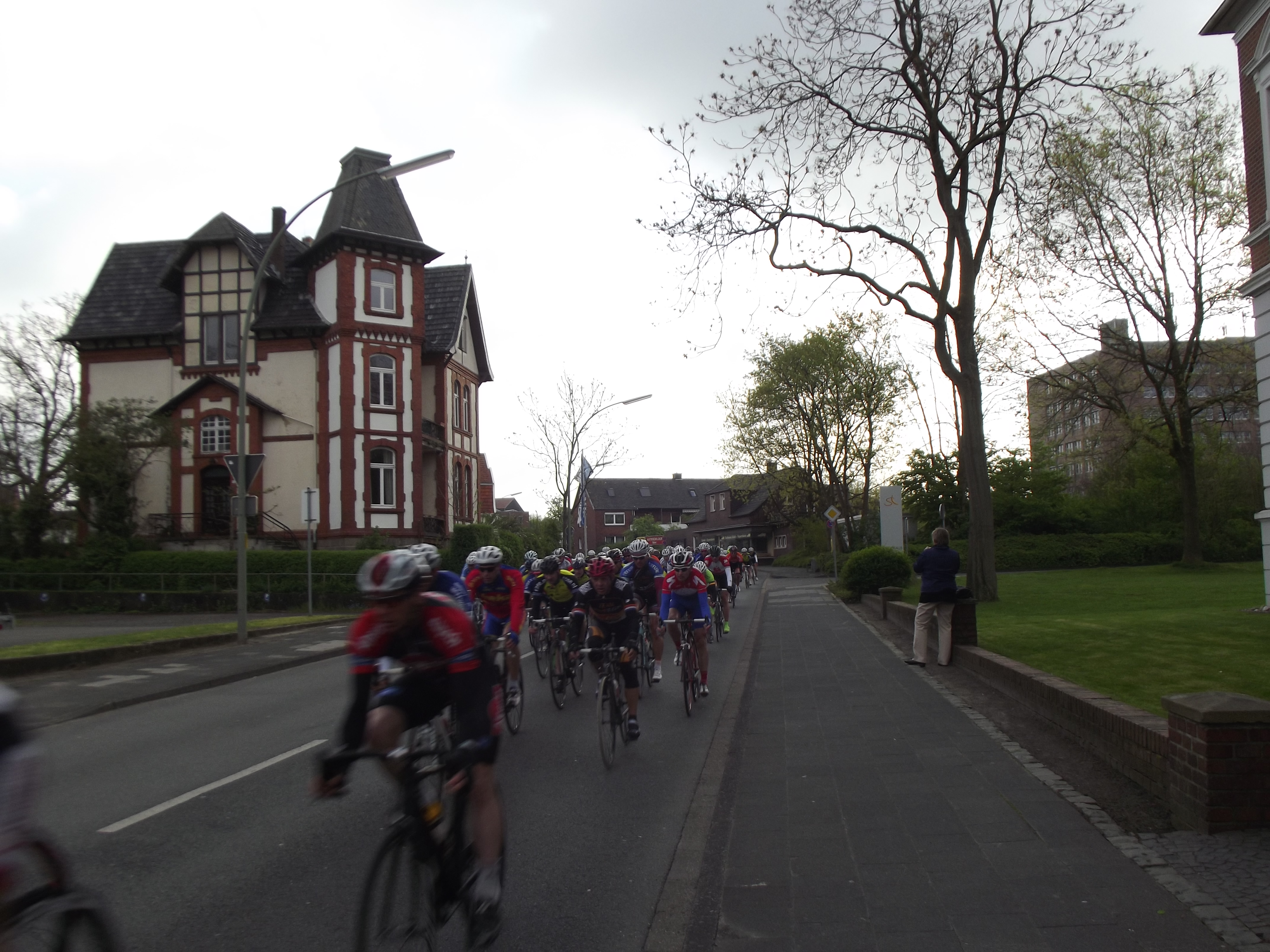
Cycle race Steinfurt 2014

== See also ==
- Steinfurter Bagno, a public park near Burgsteinfurt
