= Steinfurter Bagno =

Coordinates: 52°08′26″N 7°21′24″E

The Steinfurter Bagno is a park near the town of Burgsteinfurt in the German state of North Rhine-Westphalia.

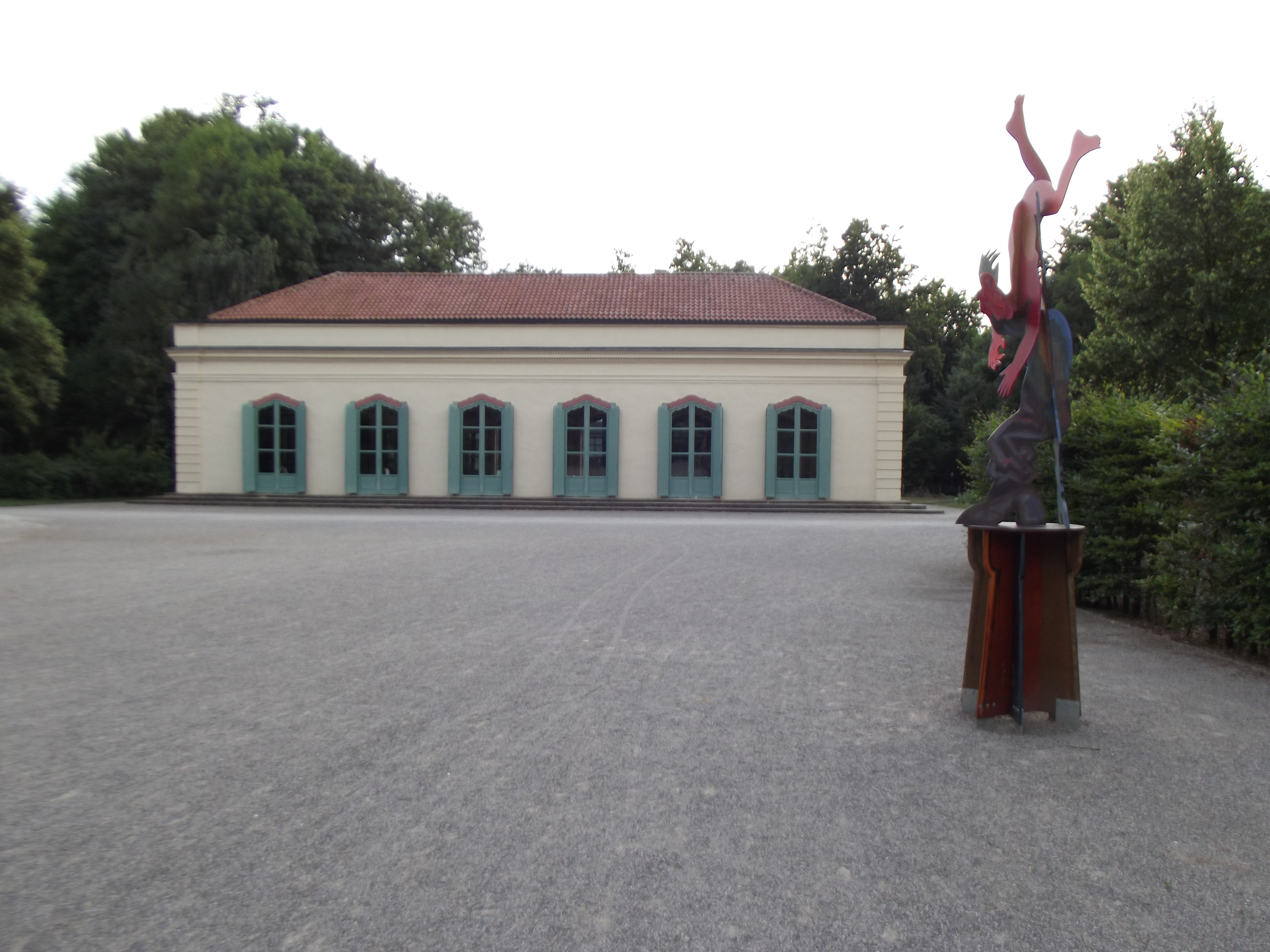
Concerthall

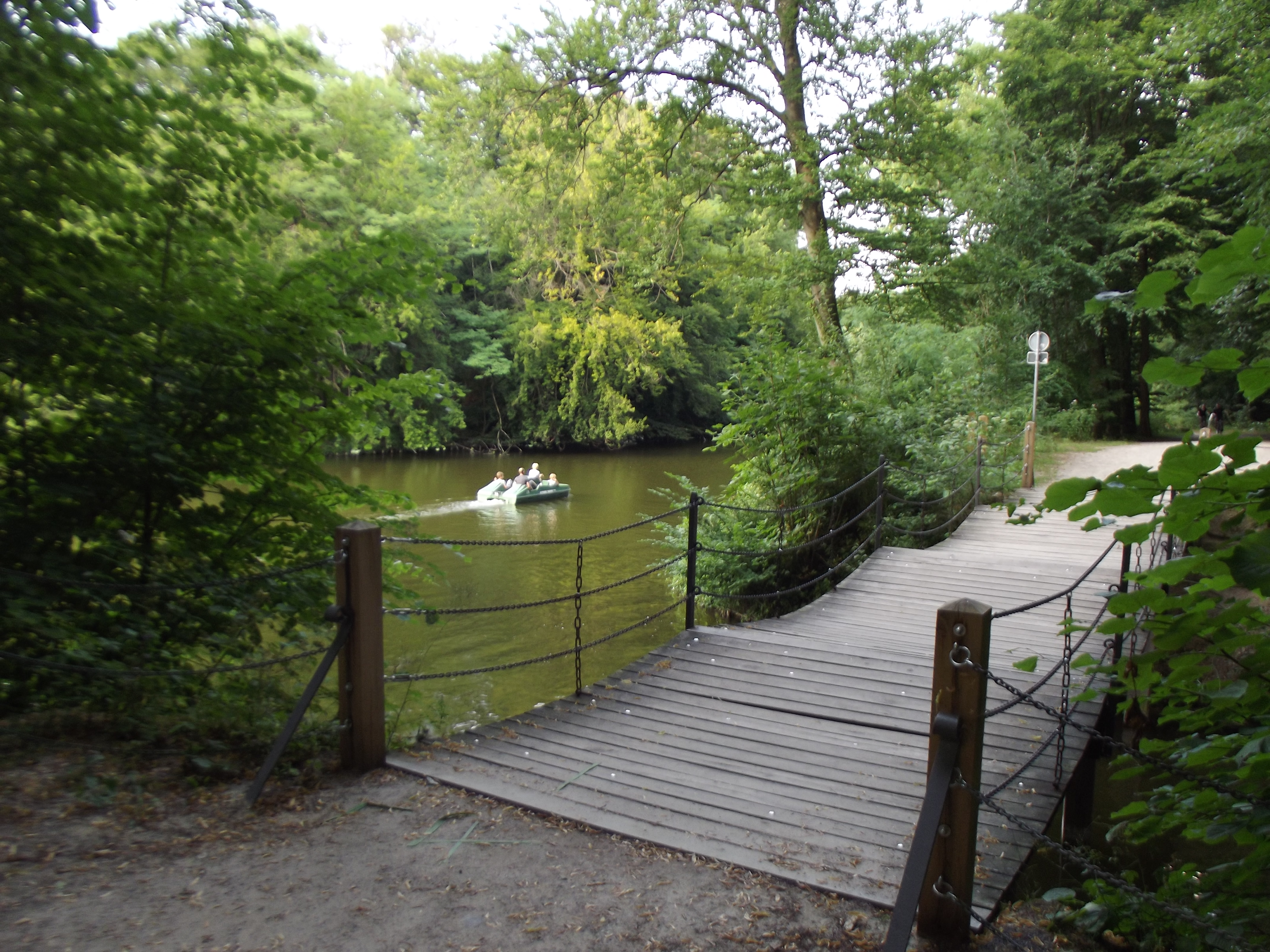
Recreation area

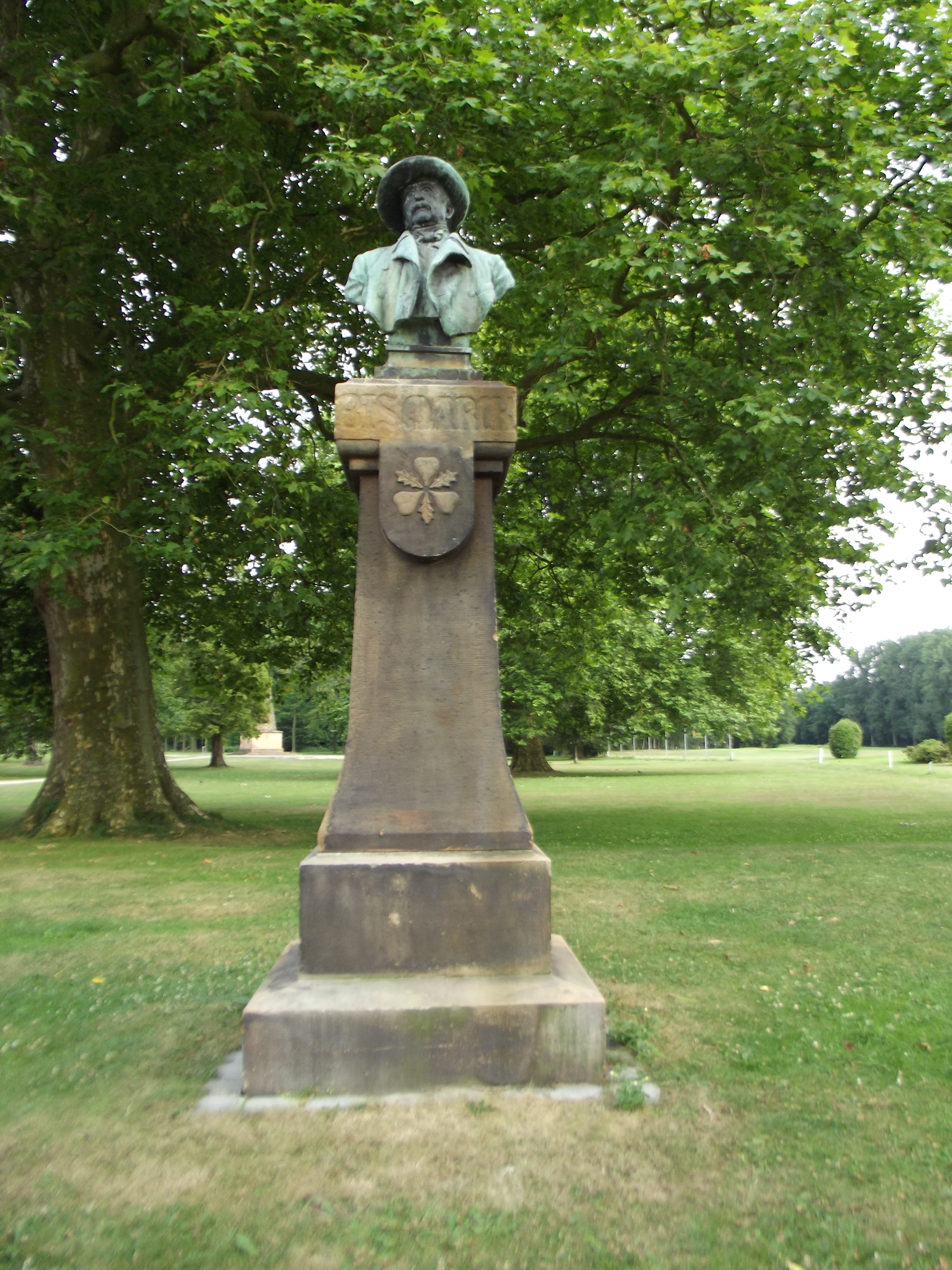
Bismarck statue

== History ==
=== Amusement park ===
Count Charles Paul Ernest of Bentheim-Steinfurt founded it in 1765 with the intention of creating a summer residence for his family. The initial design adhered to the French garden tradition of imposing strict order and symmetry on the layout. Following Count Louis' succession in 1780, the park saw the addition of various buildings and structures, including the so-called Greece and Egypt, as well as imitations of Oriental and Far-Eastern styles. The oldest surviving layout dates from 1787 and includes 105 buildings, fountains, bridges, statues, islands, gardens, and paths crammed onto a 125-hectare plot.

In later years, criticism on the excessive density of objects and architectural styles and the rise of the English garden brought about substantial change to the Bagno. Buildings and other objects were removed, new ones constructed; straight ways were replaced by meandering paths, natural looking yet artificial cascades were built, large lawns created and exotic trees planted. The Bagno developed into the most prominent park of Westphalia boasting extraordinary fountains, a widely known chapel, and a lake navigated by a fleet of small yet pompous ships. In a rather modern move, the Count opened the park to the general public.

=== French occupation ===
The park experienced a sudden change in 1806 when Napoleon's vassals seized the county. Count Louis traveled to Paris to talk to the French emperor in person and reclaim his position, but to no avail. His son Alexius maintained the park on scant means, and saw himself forced to demolish a number of buildings for want of money for their maintenance. By 1828, only 16 of the 39 buildings counted in 1806 remained; of these 3 remain to this day.

== Restoration ==
State contributions of 4.1 million Euros helped reshape the Bagno in 2004; the refurbished concert hall has gained particular popularity since. In 2006, the park became a member of the European Garden Heritage Network.
