= Johann Friedrich Böckelmann =

17th century German jurist

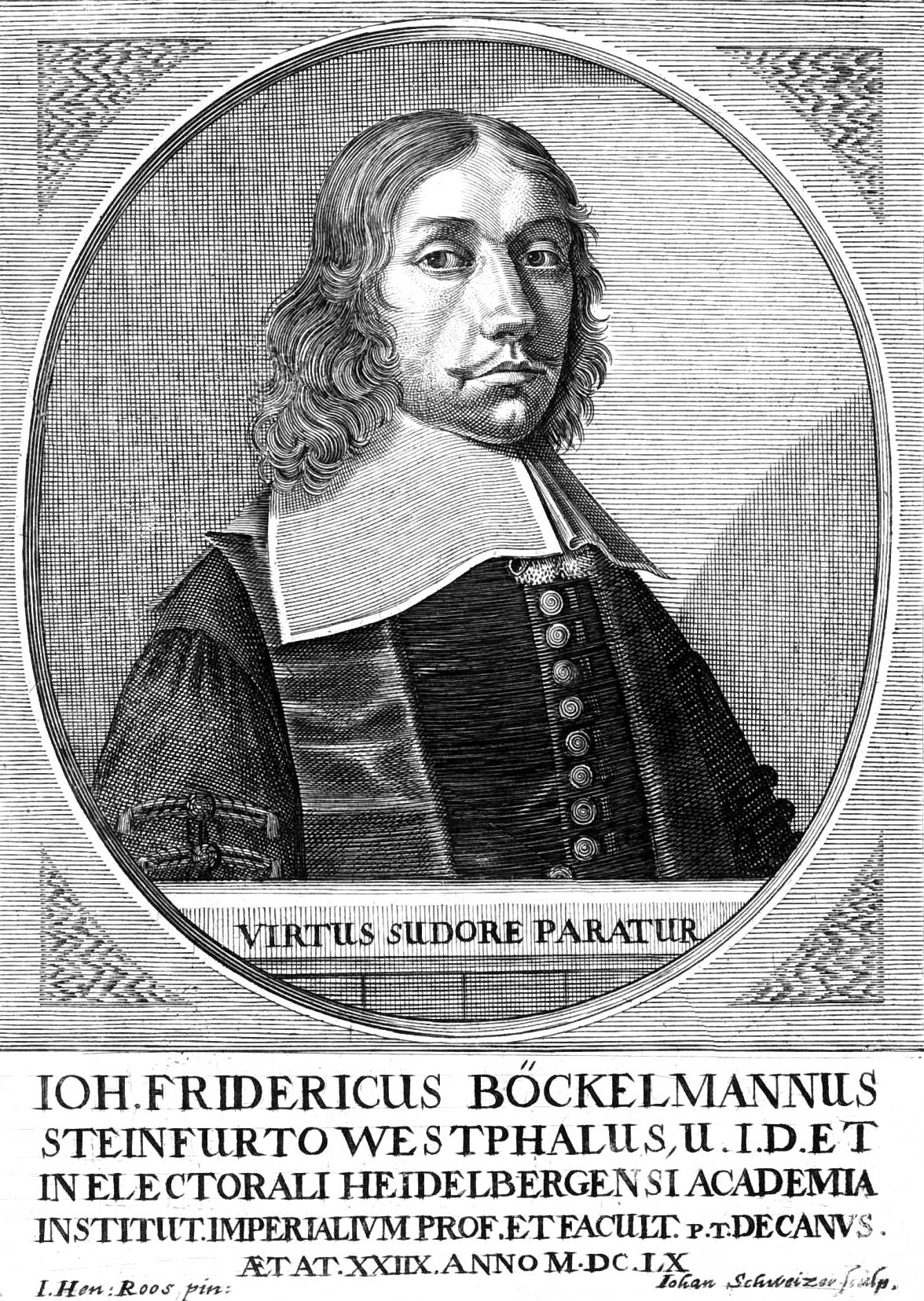
Johann Friedrich Böckelmann

Johann Friedrich Böckelmann (1633–1681) was a German jurist.

Born in Steinfurt, Böckelmann studied law at Heidelberg, where he became a professor in 1661. He was also president of the electoral court of law and a councillor and envoy of the prince elector.

In 1670, Böckelmann moved to teach at Leiden, where he had lasting influence by introducing the new methodus compendiarium, a teaching method based no longer on the Corpus Iuris Civilis itself, but on shorter summaries. One of these, his Compendium Institutionum, was in use up until the 19th century. To this day, the university of Leiden administrates a Legatum Böckelmannianum from which one outstanding law student receives a stipend.
