= Krummacher =

Krummacher is a German surname. It may refer to:

- Emil Wilhelm Krummacher (1798–1886), German clergyman
- Friedhelm Krummacher (born 1936), German musicologist
- Friedrich Adolf Krummacher (1767–1845), German theologian
- Friedrich Wilhelm Krummacher (1796–1868), German clergyman
- Gottfried Daniel Krummacher (1774–1837), German clergyman
- Hermann Friedrich Krummacher (1828–1890), German author and government official
- Johann-Henrich Krummacher (1947–2008), German politician and clergyman

== See also ==
- Karl Krumbacher
