= Eleonore Marie of Anhalt-Bernburg =

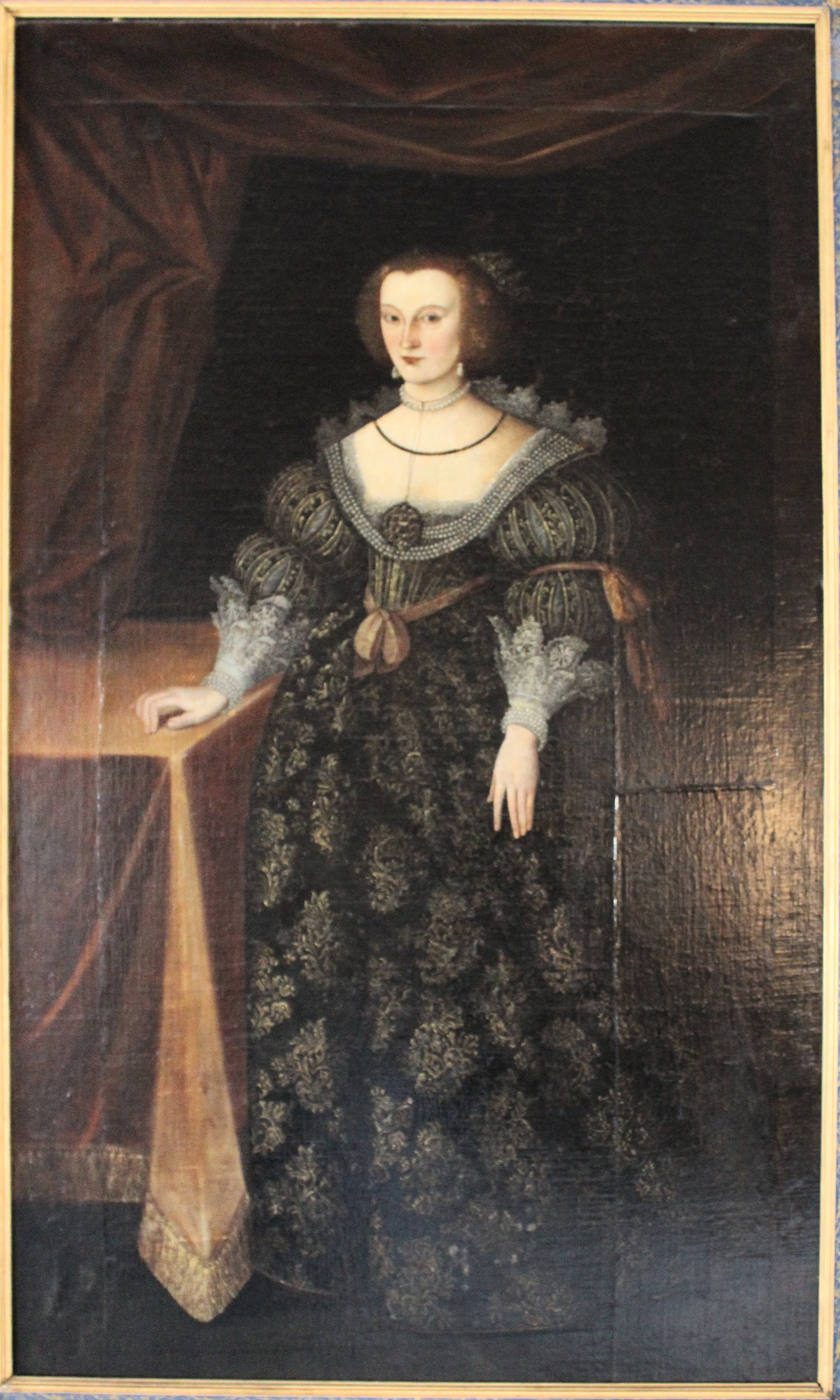
- Portrait of Eleonore Marie in Güstrow Castle
- Born: 7 August 1600; Amberg
- Died: 17 July 1657 (aged 56); Strelitz
- Burial: Cathedral in Güstrow
- Spouse: John Albert II, Duke of Mecklenburg
- Issue Detail: Gustav Adolph, Duke of Mecklenburg-Güstrow
- House: Ascania
- Father: Christian I, Prince of Anhalt-Bernburg
- Mother: Anna of Bentheim-Tecklenburg

Eleanor Marie of Anhalt-Bernburg (7 August 1600 – 17 July 1657) was a princess of Anhalt-Bernburg by birth and by marriage Duchess of Mecklenburg-Güstrow.

== Early life ==
Eleanor Marie was a daughter of Prince Christian I (1568-1639) from his marriage to Anna of Bentheim-Tecklenburg (1579-1624), the daughter of Count Arnold III of Bentheim-Tecklenburg-Steinfurt-Limburg.

== Biography ==
Under the nickname die Beständige ("the Resistant"), she was co-founder and the second head of the Académie des Loyales, one of the female counterparts of the Fruitbearing Society.

On 7 May 1626 in Güstrow, she married Duke John Albert II of Mecklenburg-Güstrow (1590-1636). After his death, she took up regency for her young son Gustav Adolph, as specified in her husband's testament. However, only three days later, her brother-in-law Adolf Frederick I deposed her as regent and guardian of her son and took up those rôles himself. This caused a bitter dispute between Eleonore Marie and her brother-in-law. However, on 4 May 1636, the estates submitted to Adolf Frederick I.

Adolf Frederick appealed against his brother's testament, and replaced all but one of the cabinet members in Güstrow, leaving only Andreas Buggenhagen in office. He also took measures against the Reformed Church in Mecklneburg-Güstrow. In 1637, he separated Gustav Adolph from his Calvinist mother. Nobody dared to participate in the private Calvinist services Eleonore Marie organized, and she was referred to hew window seat in Strelitz. Emperor Ferdinand III ruled in her favor. However, Adolf Frederick continued his court cases against her, and involved foreign powers into the matter.

Eleonore Marie finally renounced her rights in 1645. She died twelve years later on her widow seat in Strelitz. She was buried in the Cathedral in Güstrow.

== Issue ==
From her marriage to John Albert II, she had the following children:

- Anna Sophie (29 September 1628 — 10 February 1666), married Duke Louis IV of Legnica
- John Christian (1629–1631)
- Eleanor (1630–1631)
- Gustav Adolph (1633–1695)
- Louise (20 May 1635 — 6 January 1648)

== Ancestry ==
Ancestors of Eleonore Marie of Anhalt-Bernburg

8. John V, Prince of Anhalt-Zerbst
4. Joachim Ernest, Prince of Anhalt
9. Margaret of Brandenburg, Duchess of Pomerania
2. Christian I, Prince of Anhalt-Bernburg
10. Wolfgang I, Count of Barby-Mühlingen
5. Agnes of Barby-Mühlingen
11. Agnes of Mansfeld
1. Eleonore Marie of Anhalt-Bernburg
12. Eberwin III, Count of Bentheim-Steinfurt
6. Arnold III, Count of Bentheim-Steinfurt-Tecklenburg-Limburg
13. Anna of Tecklenburg-Schwerin
3. Anna of Bentheim-Tecklenburg
14. Gumprecht II, Count of Neuenahr-Alpen
7. Magdalena of Neuenahr-Alpen
15. Amöne of Daun-Falkenstein
