= Anna of Bentheim-Tecklenburg =

German princess

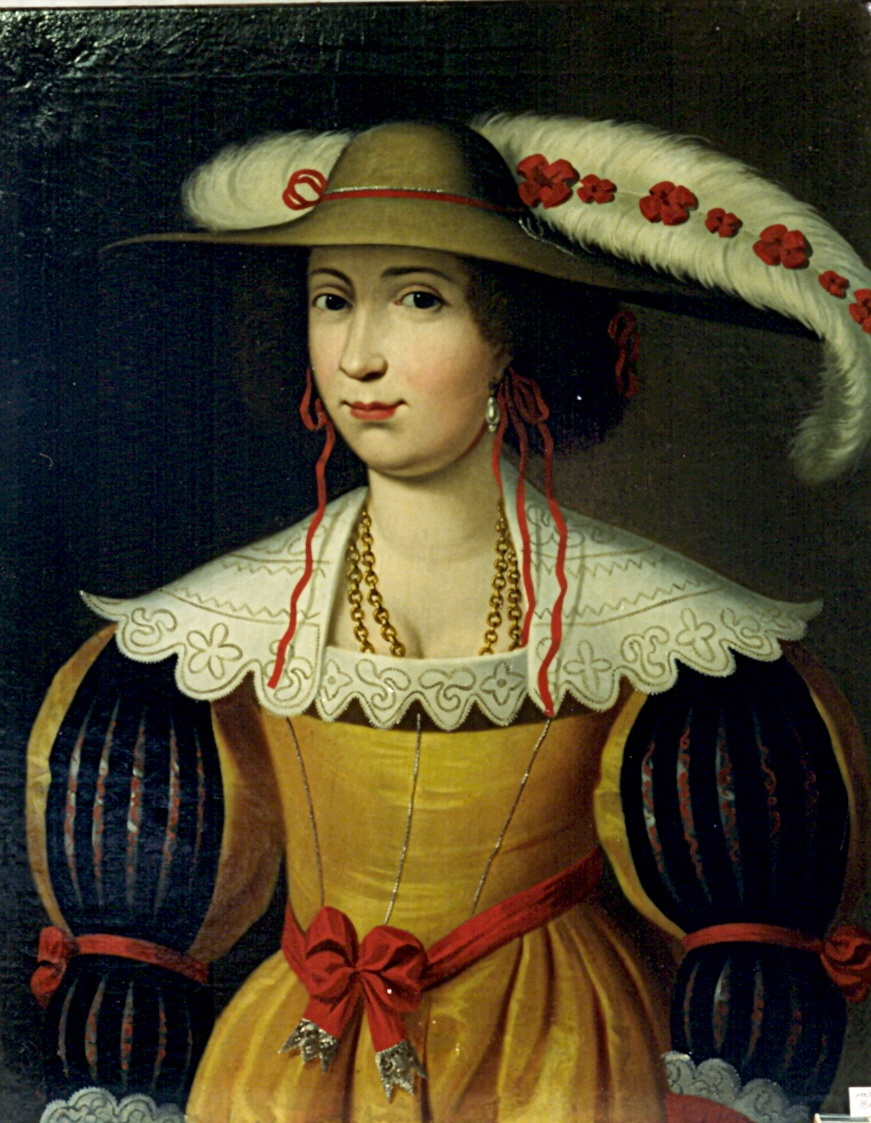

Princess of Anhalt-Bernburg
- Born: 4 January 1579; Bentheim; Holy Roman Empire
- Died: 9 December 1624 (aged 45); Bernburg, Anhalt; Holy Roman Empire
- Spouse: Christian I, Prince of Anhalt-Bernburg
- Issue: Christian II, Prince of Anhalt-Bernburg; Eleonore Marie, Duchess of Mecklenburg; Frederick, Prince of Anhalt-Harzgerode
- House: Bentheim-Tecklenburg
- Father: Arnold III, Count of Bentheim-Steinfurt-Tecklenburg-Limburg
- Mother: Magdalena of Neuenahr-Alpen

Anna, Princess of Anhalt-Bernburg (née Countess Anna of Bentheim-Tecklenburg; 4 January 1579 – 9 December 1624) was the consort of Christian I, Prince of Anhalt-Bernburg.

== Biography ==
Countess Anna of Bentheim-Tecklenburg was born in Bentheim on 4 January 1579 to Arnold III, Count of Bentheim-Steinfurt-Tecklenburg-Limburg and Magdalena of Neuenahr-Alpen.

On 2 July 1595, she married Christian I, Prince of Anhalt-Bernburg in Lohrbach. They had sixteen children of which only nine lived to mature adulthood:

1. Frederick Christian (b. and d. Amberg, 2 May 1596).
2. Amalie Juliane (b. Amberg, 10 September 1597 – d. Neinburg, Hannover, 11 August 1605), died in childhood.
3. Christian II, Prince of Anhalt-Bernburg (b. Amberg, 11 August 1599 – d. Bernburg, 22 September 1656).
4. Eleonore Marie (b. Amberg, 7 August 1600 – d. Strelitz, 17 July 1657), married on 7 May 1626 to John Albert II, Duke of Mecklenburg-Güstrow.
5. A daughter (b. and d. Amberg, May? 1601).
6. Sibylle Elisabeth (b. Amberg, 10 February 1602 – d. Strelitz, 15 August 1648).
7. Anna Magdalene (b. Amberg, 8 March 1603 – d. 30 October 1611), died in childhood.
8. Anna Sophie (b. Amberg, 10 June 1604 – d. Bernburg, 1 September 1640).
9. Louise Amalie (b. Amberg, 14 January 1606 – d. Bernburg, 17 October 1635).
10. Ernest (b. Amberg, 19 May 1608 – d. Naumburg, 3 December 1632), colonel of a cavalry regiment in Saxon service, fatally wounded at the Battle of Lützen (1632).
11. Amöena Juliane (b. Amberg, 13 November 1609 – d. Bernburg, 31 July 1628), died in adolescence.
12. Agnes Magdalene (b. Amberg, 8 October 1612 – d. Wildungen, 17 July 1629), died in adolescence.
13. Frederick, Prince of Anhalt(-Bernburg)-Harzgerode (b. Ensdorf, 16 November 1613 – d. Plötzkau, 30 June 1670).
14. Sophie Margarete (b. Amberg, 16 September 1615 – d. Dessau, 27 December 1673), married on 14 July 1651 to John Casimir, Prince of Anhalt-Dessau.
15. Dorothea Matilde (b. Amberg, 11 August 1617 – d. Bernburg, 7 May 1656).
16. Frederick Louis (b. Amberg, 17 August 1619 – d. Harzgerode, 29 January 1621), died in early childhood.

In 1603, her husband became the Prince of Anhalt-Bernburg, making her the princess consort. Anna died on 9 December 1624 in Bernburg, aged just 45, and was buried in the crypt of the Castle Church of St. Aegidien.
