= Arnold III of Bentheim-Steinfurt-Tecklenburg-Limburg =

Arnold III, Count of Bentheim-Steinfurt-Tecklenburg-Limburg
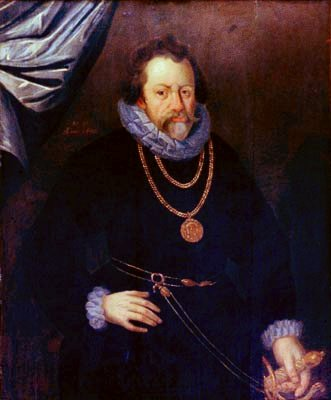
- Arnold III of Bentheim-Steinfurt
- Born: 10 or 11 October 1554; Neuenhaus
- Died: 11 January 1606 (aged 51); Tecklenburg
- Buried: Protestant church in Bad Bentheim
- Noble family: House of Bentheim-Steinfurt
- Spouse: Magdalena of Neuenahr-Alpen
- Father: Eberwin III, Count of Bentheim-Steinfurt
- Mother: Anna of Tecklenburg-Schwerin

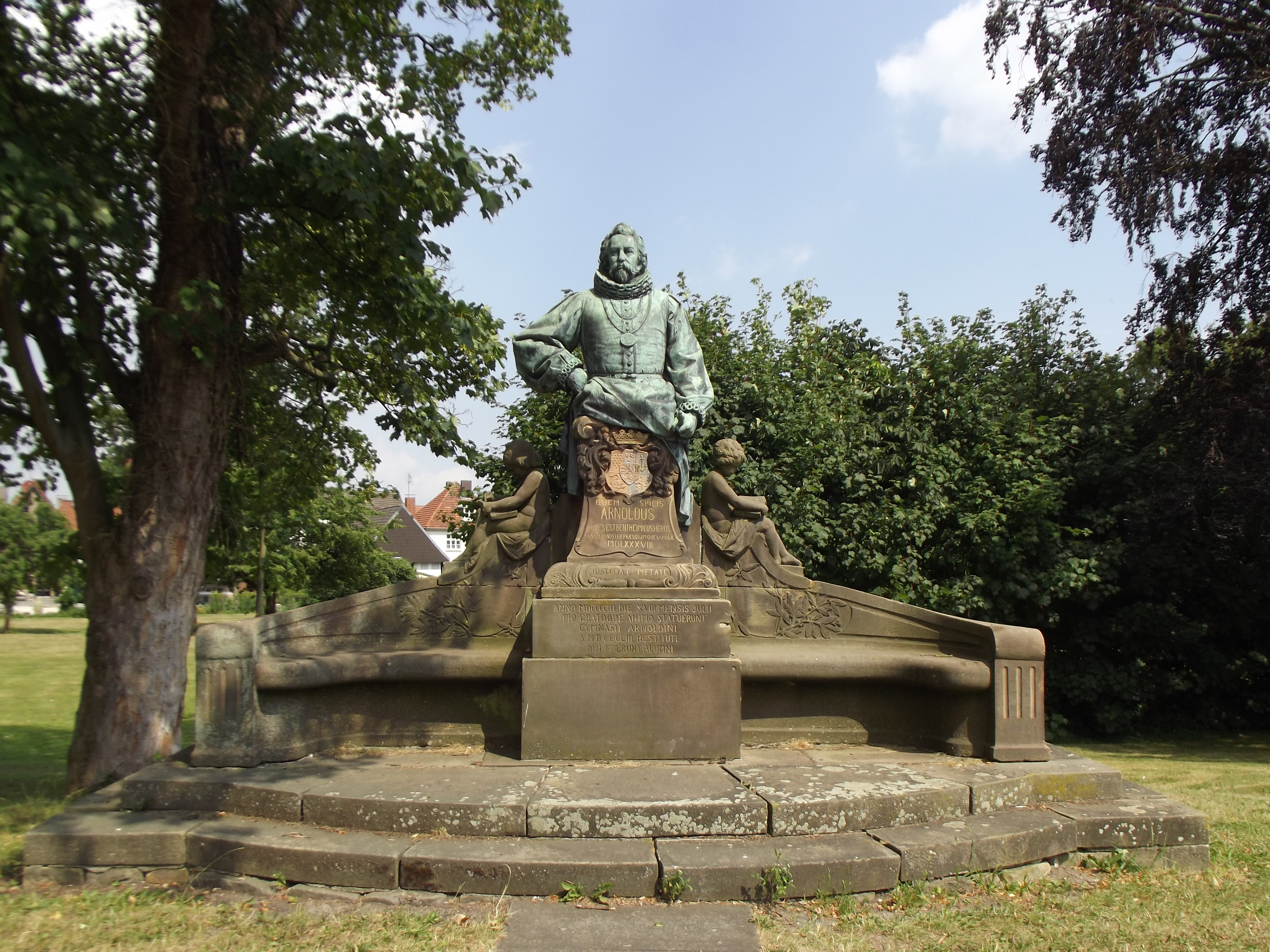
Memorial in Steinfurt.

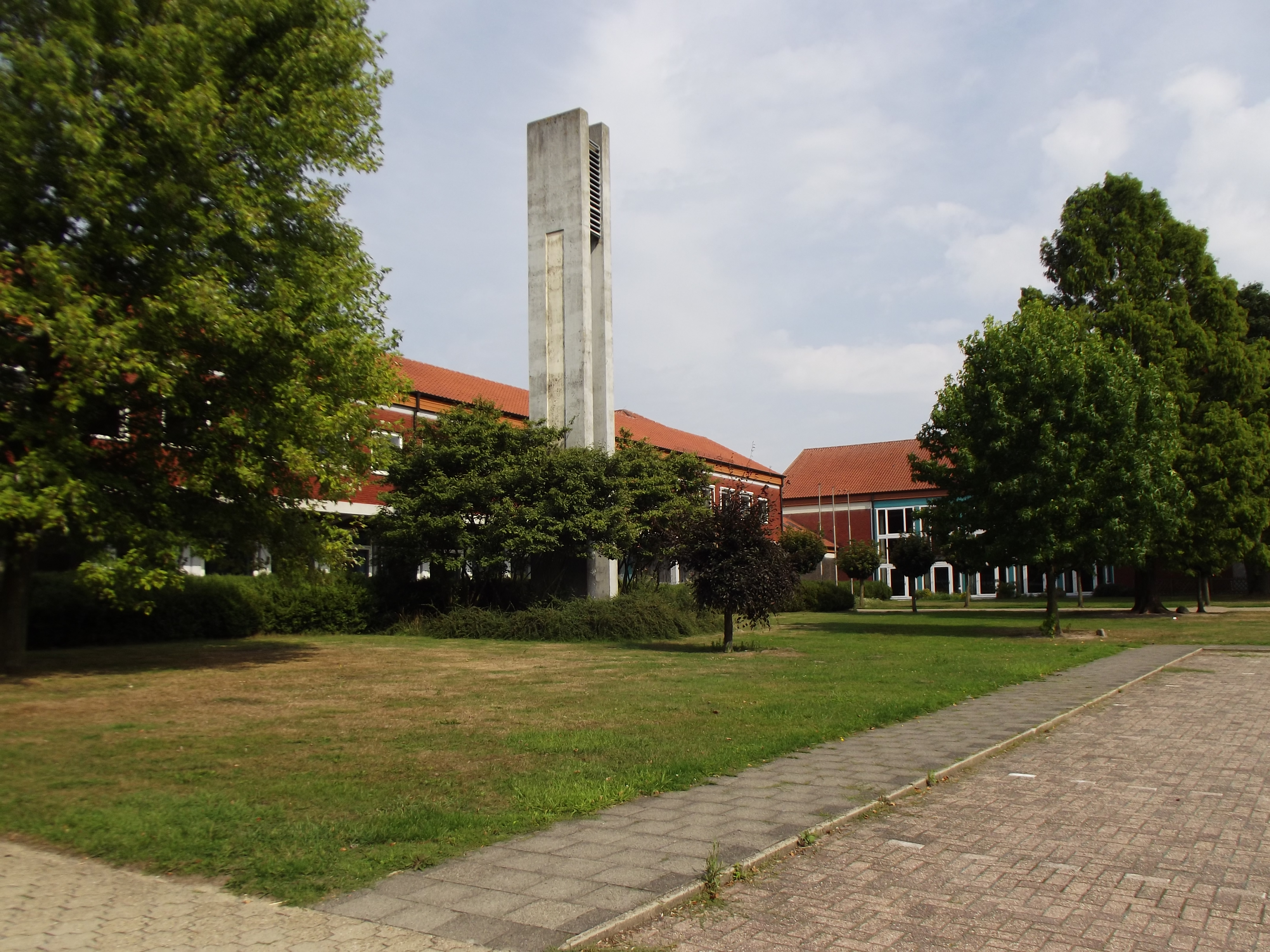
Arnoldinum Steinfurt-Burgsteinfurt

Arnold III of Bentheim-Tecklenburg-Steinfurt-Limburg (10 or 11 October 1554 in Neuenhaus – 11 January 1606 in Tecklenburg) was a German nobleman. He was Count of Bentheim, Tecklenburg and Steinfurt, and jure uxoris Count of Limburg. He ruled as Arnold IV in Bentheim and Tecklenburg, and as Arnold II in Steinfurt. In Limburg, he was the first Count named Arnold and hence just the name distinctive.

== Early life ==
Arnold was the born as the eldest child and only son of Count Eberwin III of Bentheim-Steinfurt (elder line) and his wife, Countess Anna of Tecklenburg-Schwerin. He had one sister, Countess Walburga of Wied (1555–1628).

== Biography ==
He spent his youth in Leeden Abbey with his sister Walburga. His mother educated him in regards to religion. He attended the princely school in Jülich where he studied arts, languages and knightly exercises. He had both Protestant and Catholic teachers.

In 1571, he went to Strasbourg, to study Protestant theology, law and politics. He was planning to visit the French court in Paris after completing his Grand Tour but during his journey he received word that there was a turmoil. The St. Bartholomew's Day massacre hindered him to follow through on his original plan. Instead he returned to his studies at the landgraviate court of Hesse-Kassel.

On 26 July 1573, he married Magdalena of Neuenahr-Alpen, the daughter of Count Gumprecht II, Count of Neuenahr-Alpen (1503–1556) and his wife, Countess Amöne of Daun-Falkenstein (1537–1560).

Arnold peacefully united a substantial number of territories in his hand, due to inheritance and marriage. He held the counties of Bentheim, Tecklenburg, Steinfurt, Limburg an der Lenne, the Lordship of Rheda, possessions on the Lower Rhine and bailiff rights in the Archbishopric of Cologne. This made the House of Bentheim-Tecklenburg a significant political factor. Even so, this house did not follow primogeniture; this led to its possessions being fragmented and the house losing its prominence. During his reign, Arnold had to cope with a lawsuit brought by the Counts of Solms-Braunfels about the inheritance of the County of Tecklenburg.

Between 1588 and 1593, Arnold III gradually introduced the Reformed doctrine of John Calvin and Huldrych Zwingli in his territories. He had studied it in detail while he was a student in Strasbourg in 1571 and 1572. His time in Strasbourg coined his religious stance and moreover influenced his stance on politics and education. He supported existing schools and eventually founded himself several schools in his counties. In September 1588, he founded his first school, a Latin school in an abandoned monastery in Schüttorf. In 1591, due to a looming invasion by enemy troops, the school had to move from Schüttorf to Steinfurt. In 1853, the school was expanded to a grammar school; it was named after him Arnoldium.

Arnold III died in 1606 and was buried in the Protestant church in Bad Bentheim.

== Issue ==
- Otto (22 December 1574 in Steinfurt – 1574)
- Eberwin Wirich (14 January 1576 in Bentheim – 31 May 1596 in Padua)
- Adolf (7 July 1577 in Steinfurt – 5 November 1623), married in 1606 to Margaret of Nassau-Wiesbaden, daughter of John Louis I, Count of Nassau-Wiesbaden-Idstein
- Anna (3 January 1579 – 9 December 1624), married in 1595 to Prince Christian I of Anhalt-Bernburg
- Arnold Jost (4 April 1580 – 26 August 1643), married in 1608 with Anna Amalia of Isenburg-Büdingen, daughter of Wolfgang Ernst I of Isenburg-Büdingen-Birstein
- Amalie Amoena (15 May 1581 in Tecklenburg – 31 January 1584 in Bentheim)
- William Henry (13 February 1584 in Bentheim – 6 October 1632), married in 1617 with Princess Anna Elisabeth of Anhalt-Dessau, daughter of John George I, Prince of Anhalt-Dessau
- Conrad Gumprecht (10 March 1585 in Bentheim – 10 March 1618), married in 1616 Countess Johannetta Elisabeth of Nassau-Siegen, daughter of Johann VI, Count of Nassau-Dillenburg
- Amoena Amalia (19 March 1586 in Bentheim – 3 September 1625), married in 1606 to Prince Louis I of Anhalt-Köthen
- Frederick Ludolph (23 August 1587 in Bentheim – 8 January 1629)
- Magdalena (6 May 1591 in Steinfurt – 1649), married on 24 May 1631 in Steinfurt with Count Georg Ernst of Limburg-Stirum, son of Count Jobst of Limburg
