= Eberwin III of Bentheim-Steinfurt =

Eberwin III, Count of Bentheim-Steinfurt
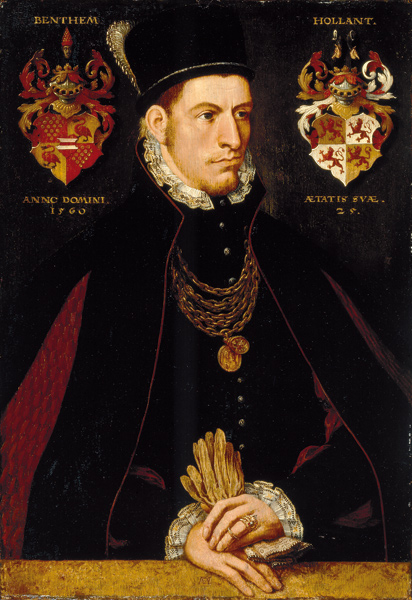
- portrait of Eberwin III by Hermann tom Ring
- Born: 1536
- Died: 19 February 1562; Bentheim Castle
- Noble family: Bentheim-Steinfurt
- Spouse: Anna of Tecklenburg-Schwerin
- Father: Arnold II of Bentheim-Steinfurt
- Mother: Walburga of Brederode-Neuenahr

Eberwin III, Count of Bentheim-Steinfurt (1536 – 19 February 1562 at Bentheim Castle) was a German nobleman. He was a member of the elder line of the House of Bentheim-Steinfurt and was the ruling Count of Bentheim and Steinfurt from 1544 until his death. From 1557, he was also Count of Tecklenburg and Lord of Rheda by marriage.

== Life ==
Eberwin III was the eldest son of Count Arnold II of Bentheim-Steinfurt and his wife, Walburga of Brederode-Neuenahr. Eberwin's younger brother Arnold married Magdalena Sophia (1540–1586), daughter of Ernest I, Duke of Brunswick-Lüneburg.

In 1553, when he was 18 years old, Eberwin III married the 21 years old Anna of Tecklenburg-Schwerin, the heiress of Tecklenburg. The reasons for this marriage were the religious and territorial policies of the two countly families. The families even agreed in the marriage contract that if Eberwin III were to die young, his younger brother Arnold should marry Anna.

After Anna's father, Count Conrad of Tecklenburg-Schwerin, died, a dispute broke out between Eberwin III and his wife. She claimed that she was entitled to rule her own inheritance as Countess suo jure. Eberwin claimed that he was entitled to rule her inheritance as Count jure uxoris. Eberwin had his wife arrested, and locked her up in her own residence, Tecklenburg Castle. Anna was only released when Count Christopher of Oldenburg intervened. After her release, the nobility of Tecklenburg sided with Anna, and accused Eberwin of adultery. Anna herself accused him of spending too much on luxury items, such as precious horses, and a portrait of himself by Hermann tom Ring. After mediation by the rulers of neighbouring territories, Anna and Eberwin agreed to a separation from bed and board.

The dispute ended in 1562, when Eberwin died from syphilis at the age of 26.

== Issue ==
From his marriage to Anna, Eberwin had two children:

- Arnold III (2 October 1554 in Neuenhaus – 11 January 1606 in Tecklenburg)
- Walburga (24 October 1555 – 9 April 1628), married in 1576 Count to Herman I of Wied
