= Hermann Beitzke =

German pathologist

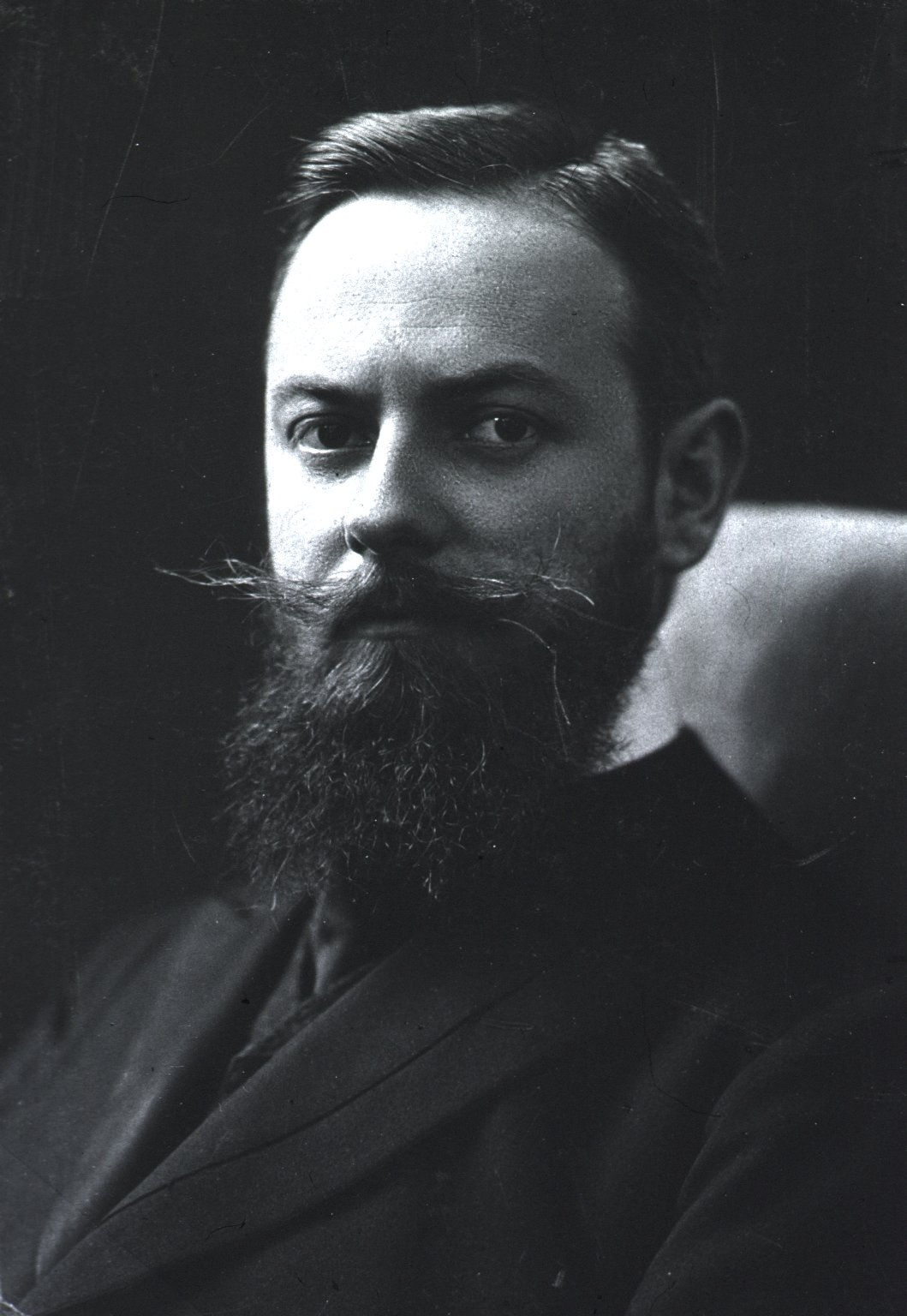
Hermann Beitzke, ca. 1910

Hermann Beitzke (21 June 1875 – 8 June 1953) was a German pathologist born in Tecklenburg, Westphalia.

Beitzke studied medicine at several universities, earning his doctorate in 1899 from the University of Kiel. In 1900-01 he was an assistant at the institute of hygiene in Halle an der Saale, and afterwards worked at the pathology institutes in Göttingen and Berlin. In 1911 he became a professor at the University of Lausanne, and in 1922 relocated to the University of Graz, where he taught classes until 1941.

He specialized in pathological investigations of infectious diseases, in particular tuberculosis studies. He was co-editor of Ergebnisse der gesamten Tuberkuloseforschung, a journal involving tuberculosis research.

== Selected publications ==
- Taschenbuch der pathologisch-histologischen Untersuchungsmethoden (Book of pathological-histological study methods), 1924.
- Die ambulante Diagnostik der Kinder-Tuberkulose (Outpatient treatment diagnostics of childhood tuberculosis), 1926.
- Pathologische-anatomische Diagnostik an der Leich nebst Anleitung zum Sezieren (Pathological-anatomical diagnostics of cadavers along with Instruction on autopsies), 1926.
