= Tecklenburg Castle =

Ruined castle in North Rhine-Westphalia, Germany

- Tecklenburg
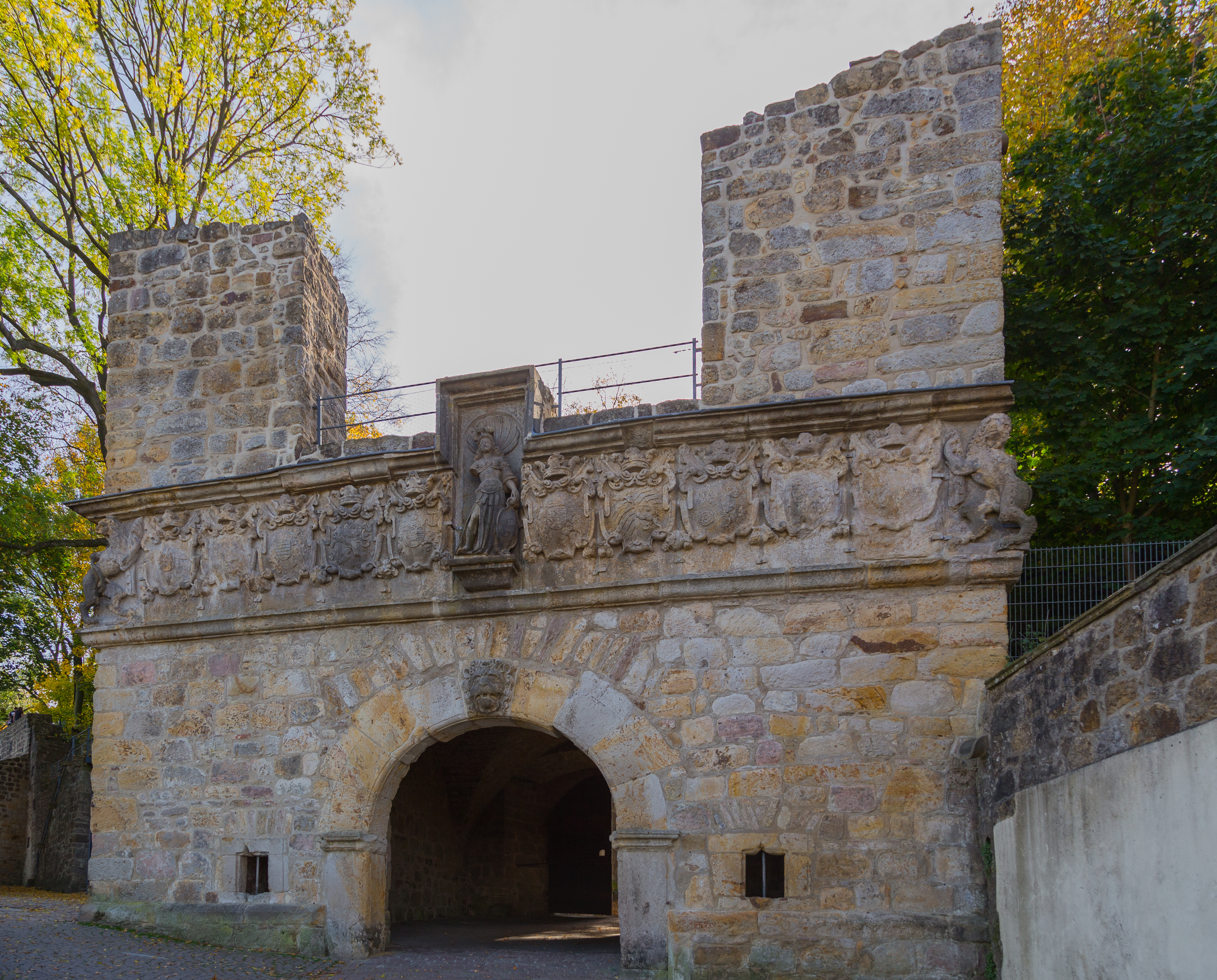
- The Mauritz Gate at Tecklenburg. In the centre of the coat of arms is Minerva, the tutelary goddess of the counts of Tecklenburg.

Site information
- Type: hill castle
- Code: DE-NW
- Condition: ruin

Location
- Location within Germany
- Coordinates: 52°13′11″N 07°48′35″E
- Height: 170 m above sea level (NN)

Site history
- Built: c. 1100

Tecklenburg Castle (German: Burg Tecklenburg), or simply the Tecklenburg, is a ruined castle and venue for the Tecklenburg Open-Air Theatre in the eponymous town of Tecklenburg in the county of Steinfurt in the state of North Rhine-Westphalia, Germany. It was once the seat of the rulers of the County of Tecklenburg.

== History ==
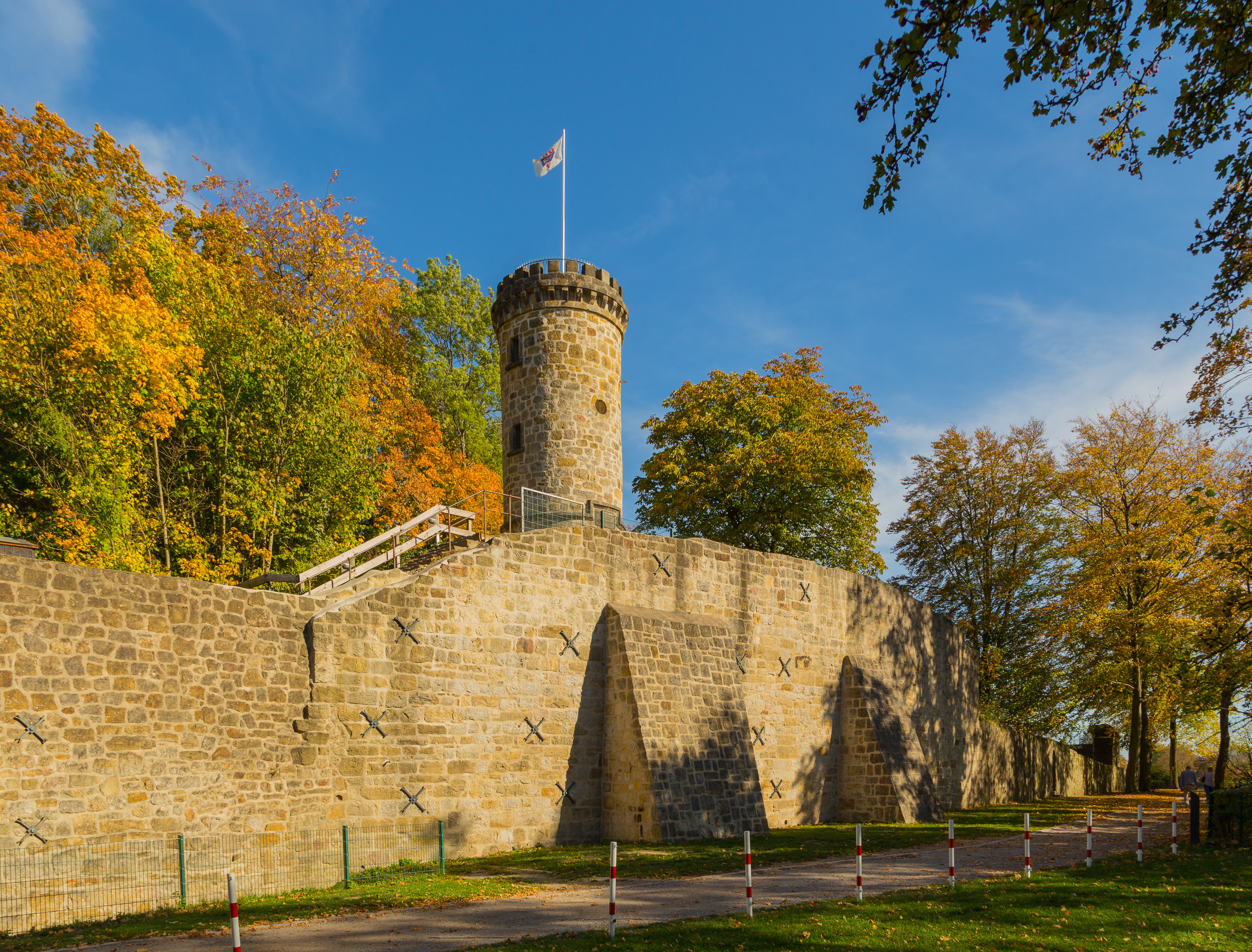
The castle ruins

=== Toll castle ===
The castle was probably built around 1100 by the Dutch Count of Zutphen to protect the important trade route from Lübeck via Bremen and Münster to Cologne, in order to be able to control this narrow and easily visible place and to be able to demand customs duties. Later, to secure the access roads to Tecklenburg, some of the lesser nobility were engaged as vassals to secure this route, including lords from the House of Marck, and the estates of Kieseling, Horne, Meeseburg, Kronenburg, Hülshoff and Wondahl.

The castle is first mentioned in an 1184 document. At that time, the Tecklenburg was said to have been the largest and most powerful hilltop castle in northern Germany. Between 1168 and 1190 Archbishop Philip of Cologne acquired the County of Tecklenburg from Count Henry of Guelders and Count Symon of Tecklenburg for the extraordinarily high sum of 3,300 marks. Count Symon received Tecklenburg Castle as a fiefdom and gave his allods for 50 marks to the Archbishopric of Cologne. Connected with this were the lordships of the prince-bishoprics of Münster and Osnabrück, which from now on lay near Cologne and thus formed the basis of the claim of ducal dignity for Westphalia by the Archbishops of Cologne.

In 1226, the papal legate, Conrad of Urach, imposed the ban on the castle and the city of Tecklenburg because Frederick of Isenberg, the alleged murderer of Archbishop Engelbert of Cologne, had hidden himself at the castle in 1225. In 1227, the Cologne church took over Tecklenburg Castle because, according to the people of Cologne, the count had forfeited possession of the castle as a result of his participation in the conspiracy against Engelbert. In 1282, the castle came into the possession of Bishop Conrad II of Osnabrück.

After the Counts of Tecklenburg died out in 1262, the county went into the possession of the Counts of Bentheim. Between 1328 and 1562, it belonged to the Count of Schwerin. He was able to acquire the Barony of Rheda in 1365. But in 1400, he lost the northern parts of the county with the districts of Cloppenburg, Friesoythe and Bevergern to the Prince-Bishopric of Münster.

In 1400, during the rule of Count Nicholas II, Tecklenburg lost its northern territory in a conflict with the Bishopric of Osnabrück. This, and the fact that the Bremen-Cologne trade route was being re-routed more and more via Osnabrück with its now upgraded trunk road, reduced the strategic importance of Tecklenburg. Weapon technology had also changed significantly in the meantime, and the outdated defensive systems of Tecklenburg could only be improved very slowly.

=== From fortified castle to stately home ===
In 1527 under Count Conrad, the County of Tecklenburg became the first region in Westphalia to reform. In 1538, Conrad finally joined the Schmalkaldic League, a military alliance of Protestant princes and cities. In 1547, Conrad took part in the Battle of Mühlberg, in which the Protestants were defeated by the Catholics under Emperor Charles V. During this phase of the conflict, the defensive strength of the castle was greatly expanded because attacks were always expected. For example, a bastion was built in the northeast of the castle. From there, fire could be brought to bear on the southeastern moat, the market square, the valley to the north and the northwestern side of the castle. It is quite likely that a second bastion was built, but evidence of it has not yet been found. The houses along Ibbenbürener Straße were torn down as they were in the field of fire from the north. There is disagreement about the scale of the demolition of the town, and in some cases it is assumed that the town of Tecklenburg no longer existed for a time, as the buildings north of the castle including Ibbenbürener Strasse and the market square made up the entire town. Church historical sources about Tecklenburg were also lost during this time. When the military situation eased again in the second half of the 16th century and a temporary peace returned, the town was able to be rebuilt.

The castle also underwent numerous structural changes under Countess Anna, Count Conrad's daughter. These mainly served to improve the living comfort of the Tecklenburg and to develop it into a stately residential home. The outer windows were enlarged and a new access, today's Schlossstrasse, was constructed to reach the new north-eastern entrance to the castle. All of this resulted in the Tecklenburg losing much of its defensive strength, and a large part of the bastion was buried by the embankment on which Schlossstrasse was built. Over time, the bastion fell into obscurity and was only rediscovered by chance in 1944, when a large cavity was found while digging an air raid shelter. It turned out to be the vault of the bastion. In the 17th century the Mauritz Gate (Mauritztor) was built at the new entrance by Count Mauritz. The ground floor and parts of the first floor of the gate with its richly designed coat of arms frieze are still present today.

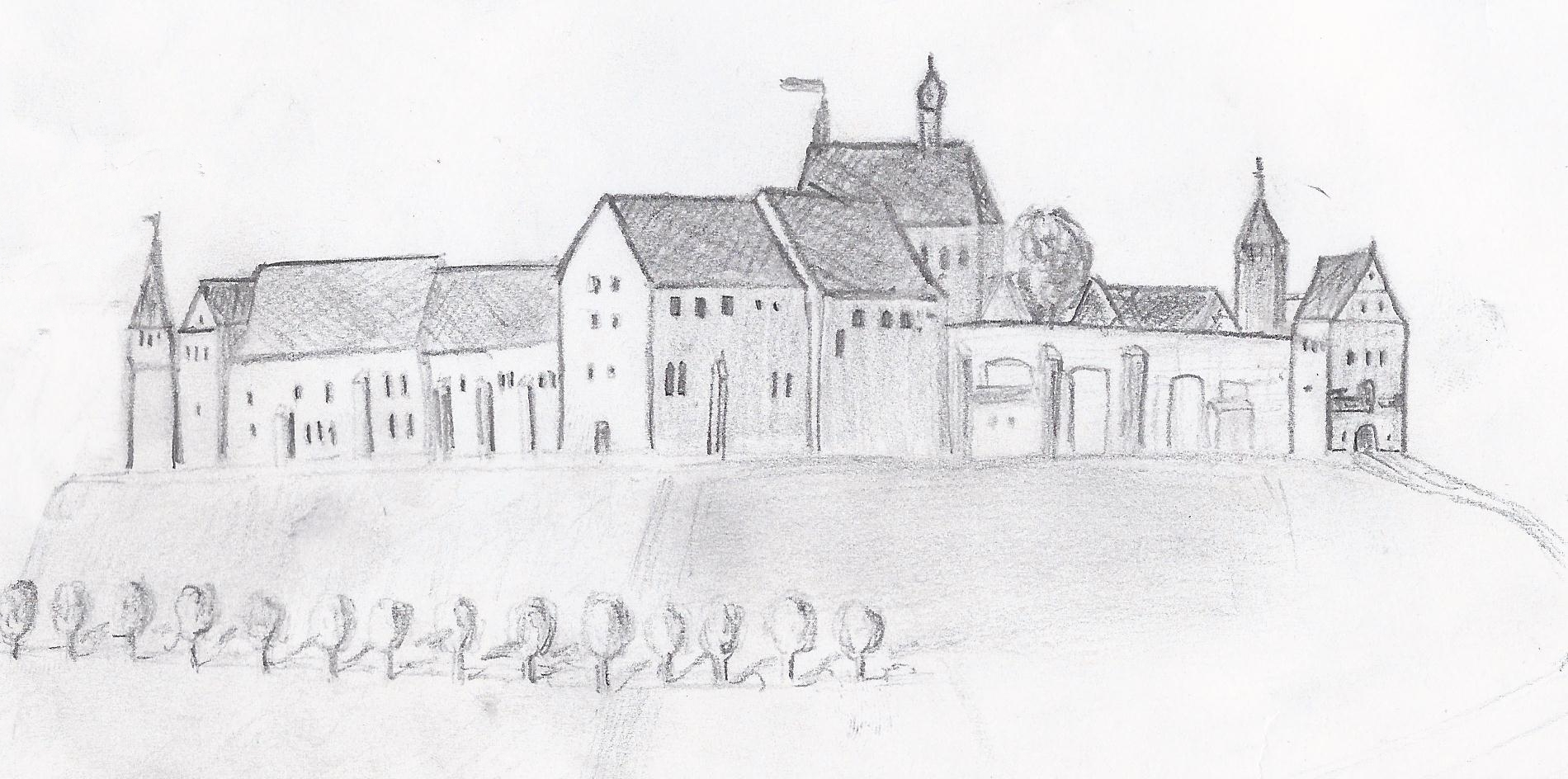
The castle in the 17th century as seen from the Kahler Berg, based on the Solms engraving

The county of Tecklenburg went to Arnold II (IV) of Bentheim-Tecklenburg in 1557, bypassing the inheritance claims of the house of Solms-Braunfels. His son Adolphus founded a special line of the family in Tecklenburg in 1606. In 1588, the counts introduced the Reformed Church. As a result of a judgment by the Reichskammergericht, the county of Tecklenburg fell to the Solms house in 1696. Count William Moritz of Solms-Braunfels sold Tecklenburg in 1707 to Prussia. In the Berlin Treaty of 1729, the comital House of Bentheim-Tecklenburg waived all claims against Prussia.

=== Under Prussian rule ===
With its sale to Prussia in 1707, Tecklenburg finally lost its independence and sovereignty. At that time, the Tecklenburg was in an extremely poor structural condition. Many attempts were made by Prussia to develop the Tecklenburg into a defensive fortress, numerous remains of the walls of the defensive systems bear witness to this to this day. Finally these attempts were abandoned and the Tecklenburg was razed. From 1744, the castle was used as a quarry and gradually fell into ruin. Fragments of the castle are scattered all over Tecklenburg. The splendid renaissance fireplace of the Tecklenburg hotel Drei Kronen comes from the castle, as does the décor of the bridge piers of the Marcks house, and Tecklenburg prison was also built from stones from the castle.

Not until the second half of the 19th century, were the principles of monument protection considered. At that time, the constant demolition was stopped and attempts were made to conserve the remains. In 1884, the Wierturm tower was built on the rampart that separated the forecourt from the main castle in memory of court doctor, Johann Weyer, who, with Countess Anna, opposed the burning of witches. At the end of the 19th century, there were plans to build a large climatic spa hotel on the castle complex, but these were rejected. On 7 August 1907, in the presence of Kaiser William II, a solemn ceremony celebrating the 200th anniversary of Tecklenburg's membership of Prussia was celebrated in the inner courtyard.

=== Open-air stage ===
From 1927, plays have been performed in the outer courtyard of the Tecklenburg. Since 1949, the Tecklenburg, whose courtyard now has 2,300 seats and whose stage technology enables professional musical performances, has been the venue for the Tecklenburg Open-Air Theatre.

== Description ==
The hill castle stands on the so-called Burgberg ("Castle Hill") at a height of 170 m above NN in the Teutoburg Forest.

The complex has two courtyards, an outer ward and an inner ward. A moat and an embankment separate these two courtyards from one another. Parts of the embankment and moat have survived. The embankment was crowned by the pentagonal tower called the Hakenturm or Schiffsturm, the highest tower in the castle. Today only its foundation has survived up to the height of the embankment's crown. The Mauritz Gate leads to the outer ward. The second ward was enclosed on three sides by buildings, only fragments of the foundation walls remain. An exception is the so-called Krönchen ("Little Crown"), the larger scale remains of a room. According to legend, the castle chapel was located in this room, but this cannot be proven, nor whether there was a castle chapel at all. However, given the size and importance of the castle, that is quite likely.

The exact construction history and the former appearance of the castle are still not fully understood. The most famous illustration of the intact Tecklenburg is the Solmser Stich ("Solms Engraving") from the 17th century.

The Wierturm is a round brick observation tower that offers a good view of Tecklenburg. The key to the tower is available for a deposit from the guest house near the tourist information office on the market square.

== Gallery ==
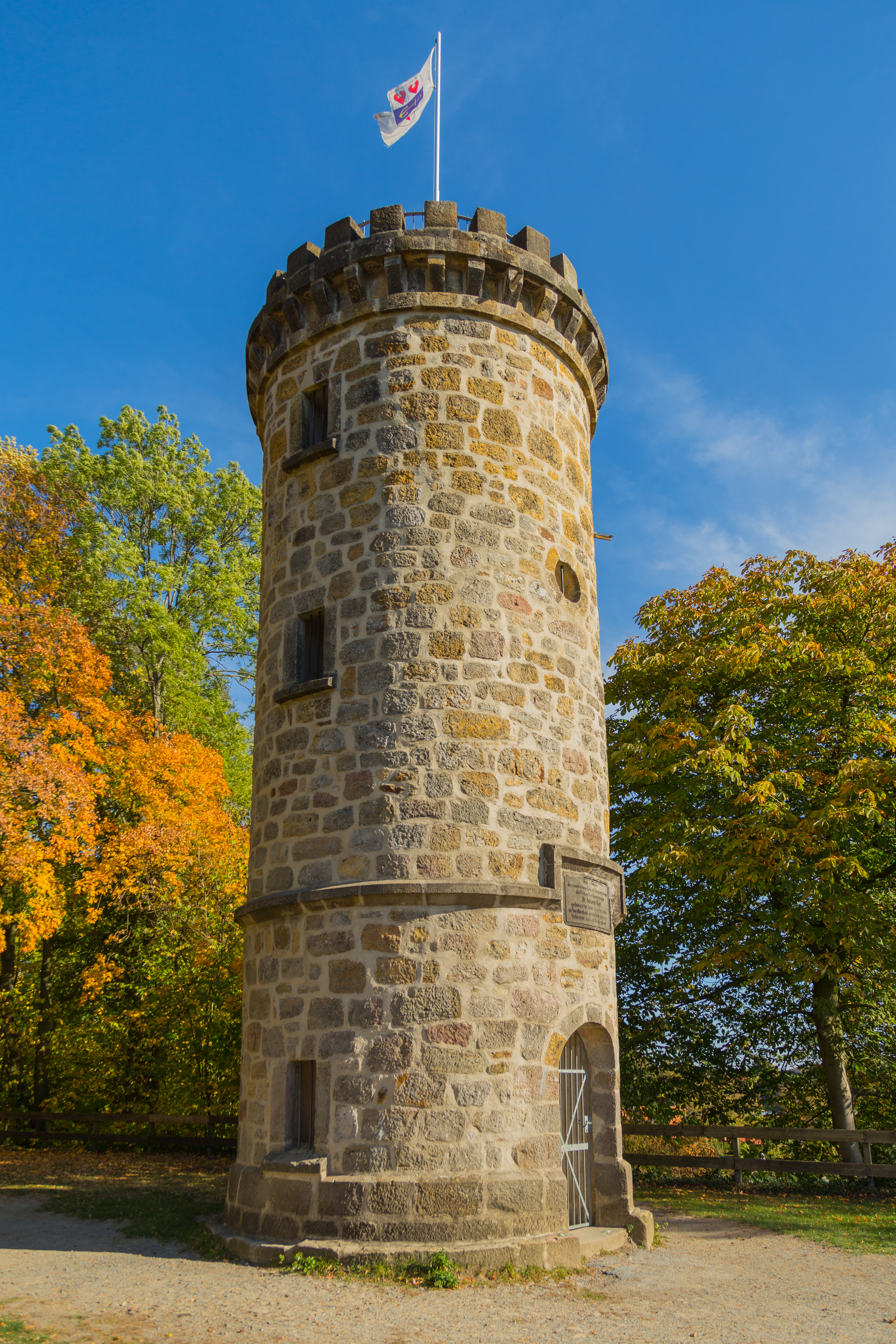
The Wierturm on the Tecklenburg

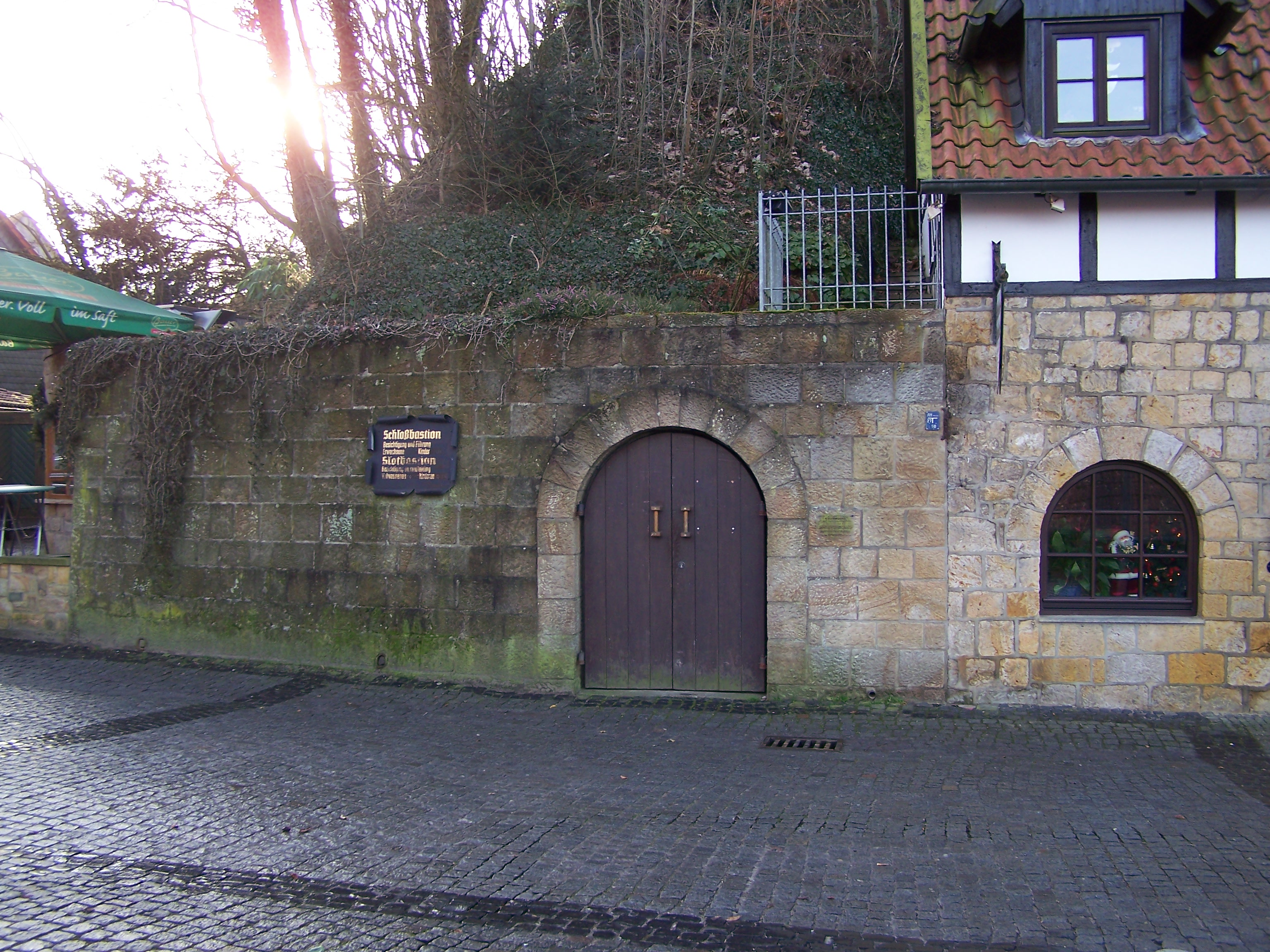
The 1944 entrance to the bastion

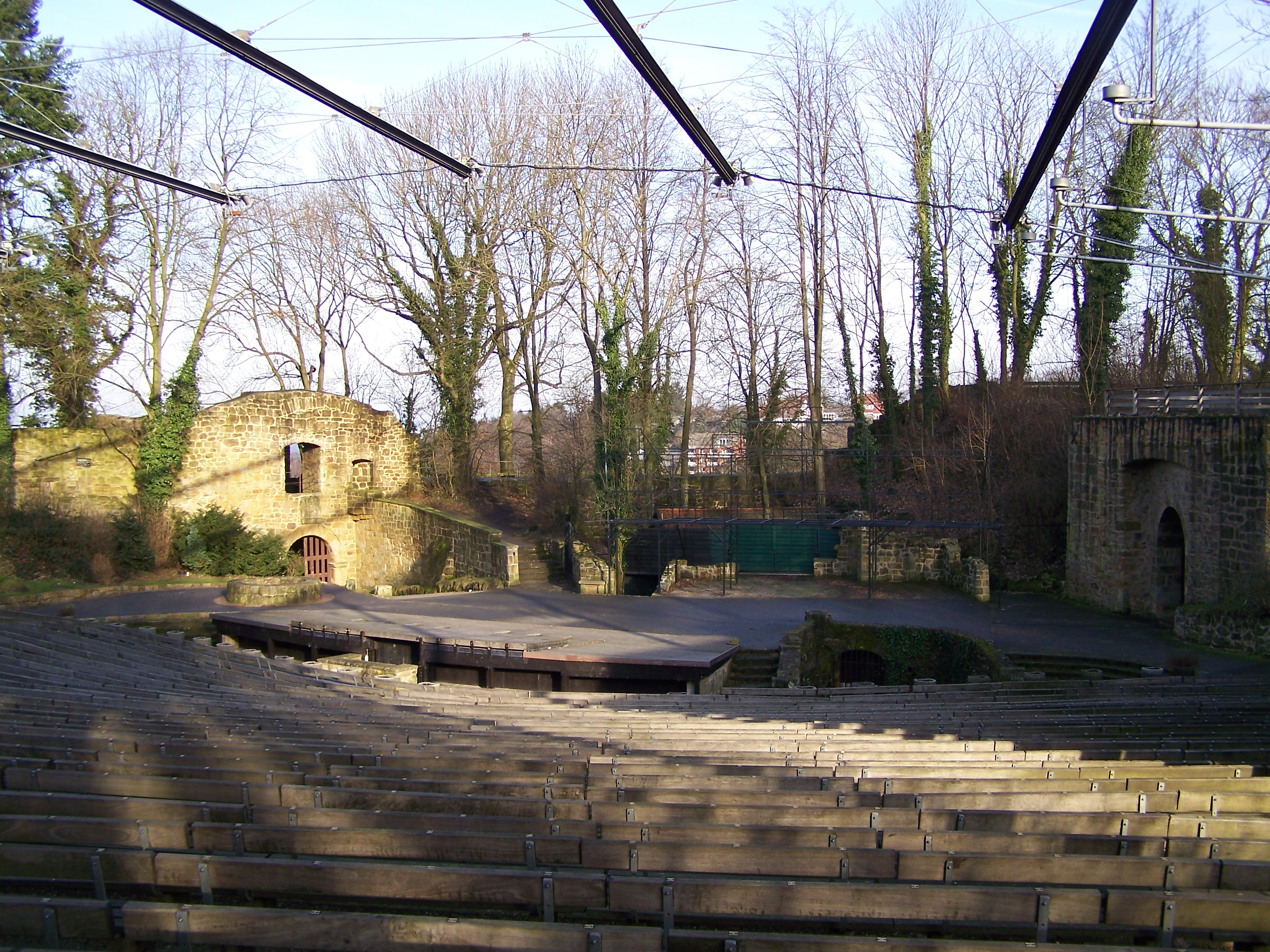
The Tecklenburg Open-Air Theatre with the Mauritz Gate and castle well.

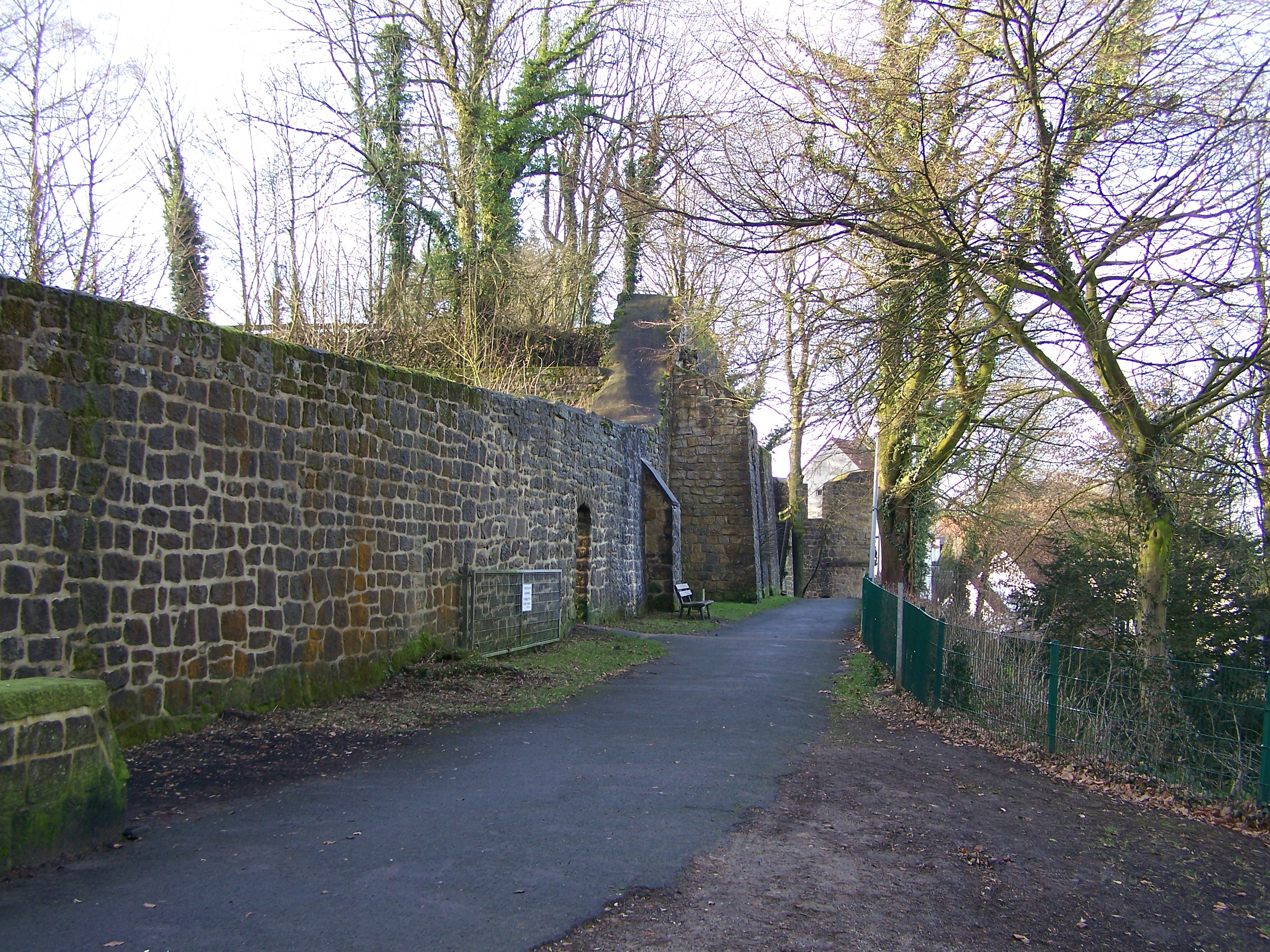
Remains of the castle wall.

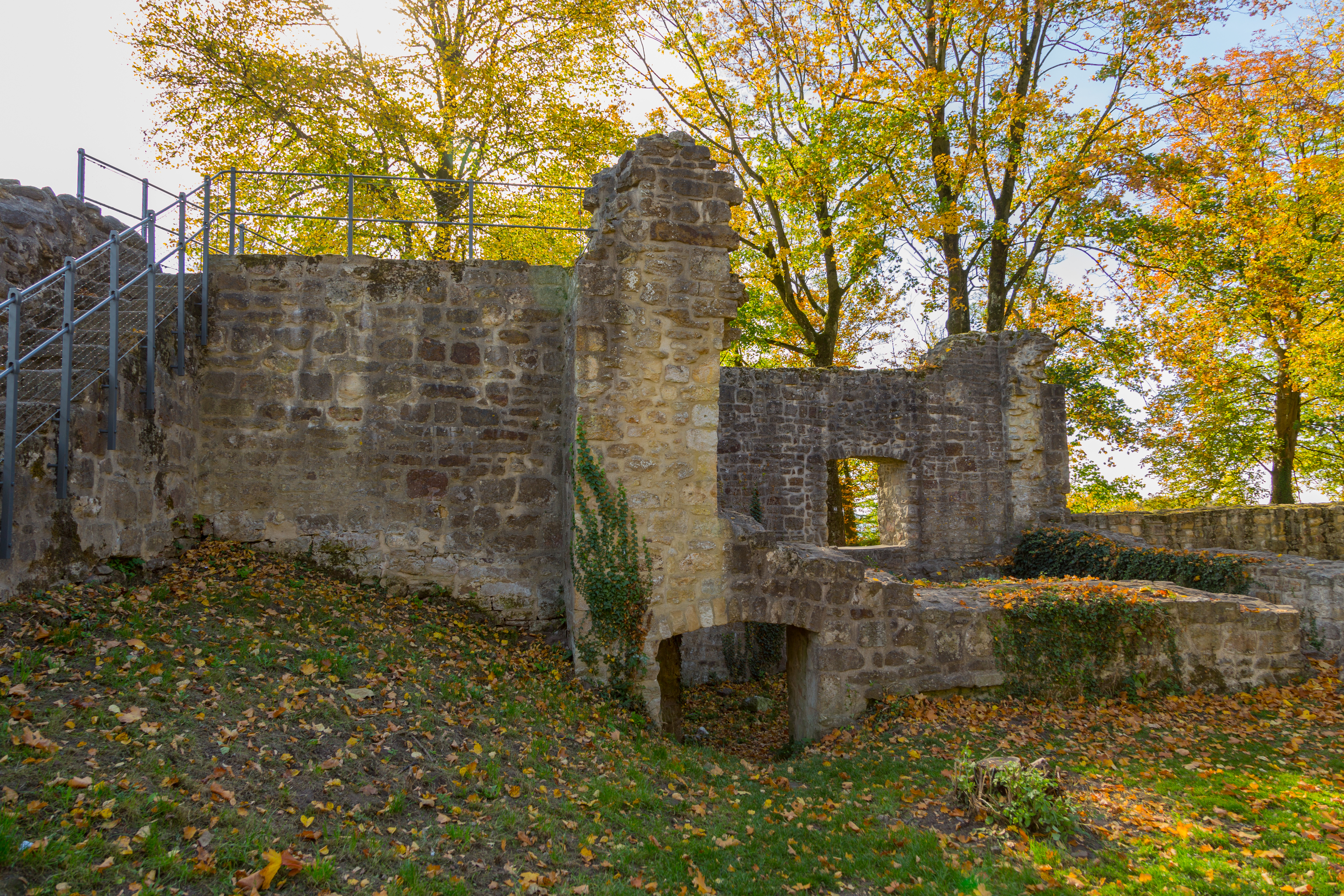
The Krönchen on the site of the old castle chapel.

== Sources ==
- Edgar F. Warnecke: Das große Buch der Burgen und Schlösser im Land von Hase und Ems. Verlag H. Th. Wenner, ISBN 3-87898-297-6
- Gabriele Böhm Wasserschloss Haus Marck Tecklenburg. Westfälische Kunststätten ISSN 0930-3952
- Gabriele Böhm Evangelische Stadtkirche Tecklenburg. Westfälische Kunststätten ISSN 0930-3952
