= Friedrich Wilhelm Krummacher =

German Reformed clergyman (1796–1868)

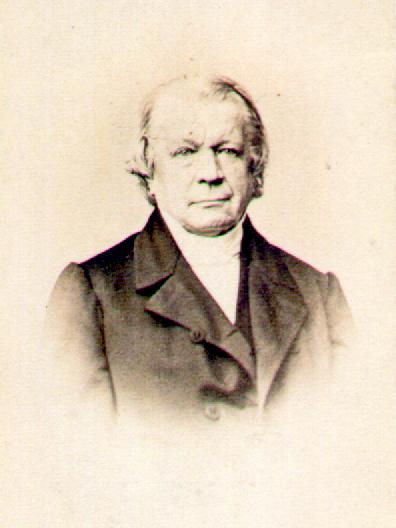
Friedrich Wilhelm Krummacher

Friedrich Wilhelm Krummacher (born in Moers, France (now Germany), 28 January 1796; died in Potsdam, Prussia (now Germany), 10 December 1868) was a German Reformed clergyman.

== Biography ==
His father, Friedrich Adolf Krummacher, was a noted German theologian and writer, and his uncle, also a German theologian, was Gottfried Daniel Krummacher. The son, after attending the gymnasiums in Duisburg and Bernburg, studied theology at Halle and Jena, and became pastor successively at Frankfurt am Main (1819), Ruhrort (1823), Gemarke, near Barmen (1825), and Elberfeld (1834). He came to New York in 1843, declined a theological professorship in Mercersburg, Pennsylvania, and afterward returned to Germany, eventually settling in Berlin, Prussia. In 1847, the Evangelical State Church in Prussia appointed him to the Trinity Church in Berlin, and in 1853 he became court chaplain at Potsdam. He was an influential promoter of the Evangelical Alliance. Although a minister of the Reformed Church, he was a zealous advocate of the older Lutheranism, and gave great offence by his denunciation of rationalists. He was a regular participant of the Evangelical Church Conferences.

His sermons on the prophet Elijah inspired the composer Felix Mendelssohn to write his 1846 choral work Elijah (oratorio).

== Literary works ==
Among his numerous works, many of which have been translated into English and Dutch, are:

- Salomo und Sulamith (1827, 9th ed. 1875)
- Flying Roll of Free Grace Displayed (New York, 1841)
- Elijah the Tishbite (German: Elias der Thisbiter; 1828-1833; 6th ed. 1874; Eng. trans. 1838)
- The Martyr Lamb (1849)
- The Last Days of Elisha (German: Elisa; 1852)
- The Risen Redeemer (1863)
- The Suffering Saviour (German: Das Passionsbuch, der leidende Christus; 1854, Eng. trans. 1870)
- Bunsen and Stahl (Berlin, 1856)
- The Dew of Israel and the Lily of God, Or, A Glimpse of the Kingdom of Grace
- Christ in the Wilderness
- The Beheading of John the Baptist
- The Church's Voice of Instruction

Among his later devotional works are:

- Gottes Wort (Berlin, 1865)
- David, der König von Israel (1866; English translation, 1870)

His sermons were published (Berlin, 1868), and his autobiography (1869) edited by his daughter, which was translated into English (London, 1871).
