= Charles Timothy Brooks =

19th-century American translator

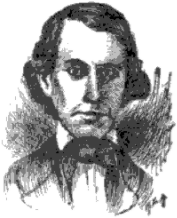
- Born: June 20, 1813; Salem, Massachusetts
- Died: June 14, 1883 (aged 69); Newport, Rhode Island
- Occupations: Translator, clergyman
- Spouse: Harriet Lyman Hazard (m. 1837)
- Children: 4

Charles Timothy Brooks (June 20, 1813 – June 14, 1883) was an American translator of German works, a poet, a transcendentalist and a Unitarian pastor.

== Biography ==
Charles Timothy Brooks was born in Salem, Massachusetts on June 20, 1813. He graduated at Harvard in 1832, then studied theology and in 1835 began to preach in Nahant, Massachusetts.

He married Harriet Lyman Hazard in October 1837, and they had four children.

He served as a preacher in various New England towns until he became pastor of the Unitarian church in Newport, Rhode Island on June 4, 1837, where he remained until his death on June 14, 1883.

In addition to his translations, he published theological writings, contributed to The Dial, a transcendentalist publication, and wrote a biography of William Ellery Channing, another Unitarian minister in Newport, Rhode Island (William Ellery Channing: A Centennial Memory, 1880).

Alpine Heights

On Alpine heights the love of God is shed;
He paints the morning red,
The flowerets white and blue,
And feeds them with his dew.
On Alpine heights a loving Father dwells.

On Alpine heights, in troops all white as snow,
The sheep and wild goats go;
There, in the solitude,
He fills their hearts with food.
On Alpine heights a loving Father dwells.

— By Charles Timothy Brooks (from the translation of “Das Alpenlied” by Friedrich Adolf Krummacher)

== Works ==
=== German translations into English ===
- Schiller's William Tell (Providence, 1838)
- Songs and Ballads from the German, forming one volume of George Ripley's Specimens of Foreign Standard Literature (Boston, 1842)
- Schiller's Homage of the Arts (New York, 1846; Boston, 1847; 2d ed., New York, 1870);
- German Lyrics (Boston, 1853);
- Goethe's Faust in the original metres (1856)
- Life, Opinions, Actions, and Fate of Hieronymus Jobs, the Candidate, a satirical poem, popular in Germany (Philadelphia, 1863)
- Richter's Titan, The Invisible Lodge, and Hesperus (1865)
- Schefer's "Layman's Breviary" (1867) and "World-Priest" (1873)
- Ruckert's "Wisdom of the Brahmin (Boston, 1882)
- several children's books

=== Poetry ===
- Aquidneck, a poem delivered at the 100th anniversary of the Redwood library (Newport, 1848)
- Songs of Field and Flood, a volume of poems (Boston, 1854)
- numerous occasional verses
- A collection of his poems, original and translated, with a memoir by Charles W. Wendte, was published in Boston after his death.

=== Other works ===
- "The Controversy touching the Old Stone Mill," opposing the theory that it was built by the Northmen (Newport, 1851);
- William Ellery Channing, A Centennial Memory (Boston, 1880)
- a volume of sermons

According to Appleton's Encyclopedia, several of Brooks' works were unpublished years after his death:

Among his unpublished translations are Schiller's "Mary Stuart" and "Joan of Arc" (1840): the "Autobiography of Klaus Harms"; Richter's "Selina"; Grillparzer's "Ahn-frau"; Immermann's "Der letzte Tulifant," and Hams Sachs's play, "The Unlike Children of Eve," first acted in 1553. In 1853, after a voyage to India for his health, Mr. Brooks wrote a narrative titled "Eight Months on the Ocean and Eight Weeks in India," which is also still in manuscript.
