= Ensdorf, Bavaria =

Ensdorf
- Municipality
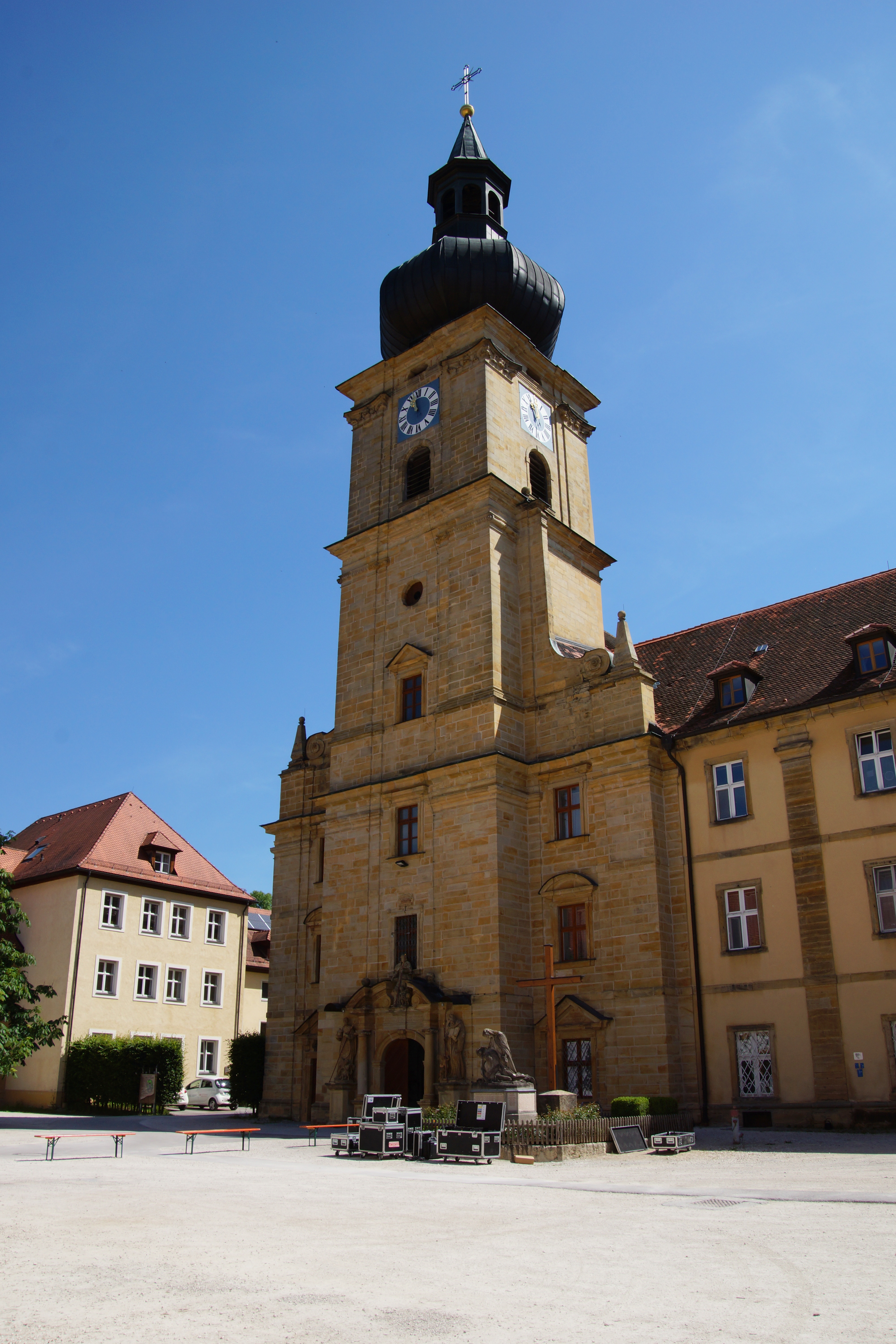
- Church of Saint James the Greater

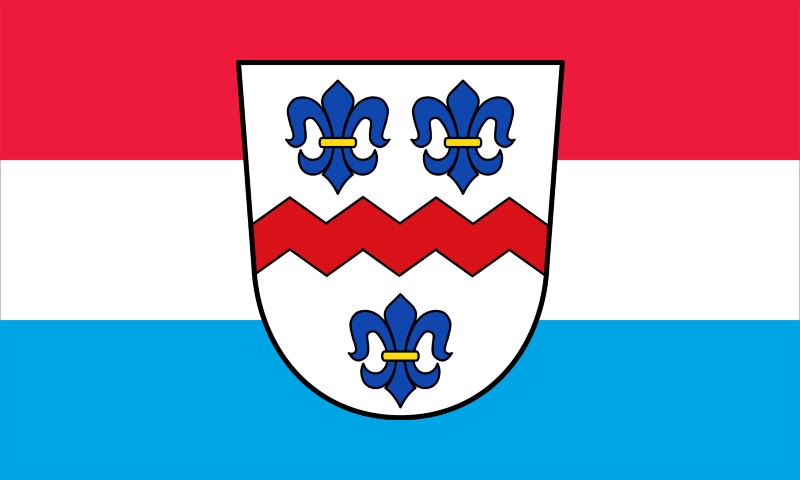
- Flag Coat of arms

- Location of Ensdorf within Amberg-Sulzbach district
- Interactive map of Ensdorf
- Location within Germany Location within Bavaria
- Coordinates: 49°21′N 11°56′E
- Country: Germany
- State: Bavaria
- Admin. region: Oberpfalz
- District: Amberg-Sulzbach

Government
  - Mayor (2020–26): Hans Ram (SPD)

Area
  - Total: 56.12 km^{2} (21.67 sq mi)
- Elevation: 469 m (1,539 ft)

Population (2025-12-31)
  - Total: 2,163
  - Density: 38.54/km^{2} (99.82/sq mi)
- Time zone: UTC+01:00 (CET)
  - Summer (DST): UTC+02:00 (CEST)
- Postal codes: 92266
- Dialling codes: 09624
- Vehicle registration: AS
- Website: www.ensdorf.de

Ensdorf (German pronunciation: [ˈɛnsdɔʁf]) is a municipality in the district of Amberg-Sulzbach in Bavaria in Germany.

== Geography ==
Apart from Ensdorf the municipality consists of the following villages:

- Dornberg
- Götzenöd
- Hirschwald
- Hofstetten
- Langenwies
- Leidersdorf
- Oberbernstein
- Palkering
- Rannahof
- Ruiding
- Schwabenhof
- Seidlthal
- Seulohe
- Thanheim
- Unterbernstein
- Uschlberg
- Wolfsbach

== Population development ==
Inhabitants:

- 1933: 825
- 1939: 761
- 1961: 1765
- 1970: 1902
- 1987: 1934
- 1995: 2142
- 2000: 2222
- 2010: 2227
- 2015: 2219

== Mayor ==
Since May 2020 Hans Ram (SPD) is the mayor.
