= Anna of Tecklenburg-Schwerin =

German regent (1532–1582)

Anna von Tecklenburg-Schwerin (1532–1582) was the ruling suo jure Countess of Tecklenburg and the lordships of Wevelinghoven and Rheda between 1557 and 1582. She was regent of the County of Bentheim-Steinfurt during the minority of her son in 1562–1573.

== Life ==
She was born to Conrad, Count of Tecklenburg-Schwerin and Mechthild of Hesse.

She married Eberwin III, Count of Bentheim-Steinfurt in 1553. After Anna's father, Count Conrad of Tecklenburg-Schwerin, died in 1557, a dispute broke out between Anna and her spouse. She claimed that she was entitled to rule her own inheritance as Countess suo jure. Eberwin claimed that he was entitled to rule her inheritance as Count jure uxoris. Eberwin had Anna arrested, and locked her up in her own residence, Tecklenburg Castle. Anna was only released when Count Christopher of Oldenburg intervened. After her release, the nobility of Tecklenburg sided with Anna, and accused Eberwin of adultery. Anna herself accused him of spending too much on luxury items, such as precious horses, and a portrait of himself by Hermann tom Ring. After mediation by the rulers of neighbouring territories, Anna and Eberwin agreed to a separation from bed and board.

When she was widowed in 1562, she became the ruler of her late spouse's fiefs during the minority of their son.

== Issue ==
- Arnold III (2 October 1554 in Neuenhaus – 11 January 1606 in Tecklenburg)
- Walburga (24 October 1555 – 9 April 1628), married in 1576 Count to Herman I of Wied
