= Emil Wilhelm Krummacher =

German clergyman and writer (1798–1886)

Emil Wilhelm Krummacher (7 May 1798 – 14 January 1886) was a German clergyman. He was the son of Friedrich Adolf Krummacher, born at Mörs. In 1841 he became pastor in Duisburg. He wrote, amongst other works, Herzensmanna aus Luthers Werken (Manna for the heart from Luther's works, 1832). His son Hermann Friedrich Krummacher was also a noted author.
