= Friedrich Adolf Krummacher =

German Reformed theologian and writer (1767–1845)

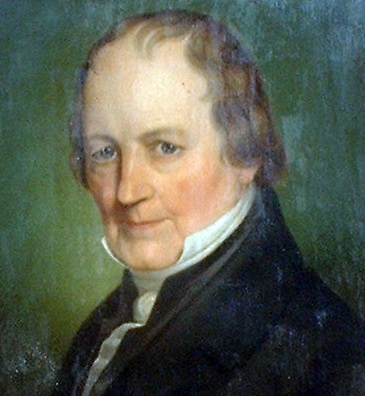
Friedrich Adolf Krummacher

Friedrich Adolf Krummacher (July 13, 1767 – April 14, 1845) was a German Reformed theologian and a writer of devotional poetry and prose.

== Biography ==
He was born in Tecklenburg, Westphalia. Having studied theology at Lingen and Halle, he became successively rector of the grammar school at Moers (1793), a professor of theology at the University of Duisburg (1800), a preacher in Kettwig (1807), Consistorialrath and superintendent in Bernburg (1812), and, after declining an invitation to the University of Bonn, pastor of the Ansgariuskirche in Bremen (1824). He died in Bremen.

== Literary works ==
He was the author of many religious works, but is best known by his Parabeln (1805; 9th edition 1876; English translation 1844). In 1858, they were added to Bohn's "Illustrated Library", with 40 illustrations.

- Hymnus an die Liebe, 1801
- Parabeln, 3 volumes, 1805–1817
- Über den Geist und die Form der evangelischen Geschichte in historischer und ästhetischer Hinsicht, 1805 ("On the Spirit and Form of Evangelical History in its Historical and Æsthetical Relations").
- Die Kinderwelt, 1809
- Festbüchlein, Tl. 1–3, 1808–1819
- Apologen und Paramythien, 1809
- Das Wörtlein: Und, eine Geburtstagsfeier, 1811
- Der Eroberer, eine Verwandlung, 1814
- Johannes, 1815
- Apostolisches Sendschreiben an die Christengemeinden von dem was noth thut zur Kirchenverbesserung, 1815 (anonym)
- Leiden, Sterben und Auferstehung unseres Herrn Jesu Christi, 1818 ("The Suffering, Death, and Resurrection of Our Lord Jesus Christ").
- Fürst Wolfgang zu Anhalt, eine Reformationspredigt, 1820
- Briefwechsel zwischen Asmus und seinem Vetter, 1820
- Die freie evangelische Kirche, ein Friedensgruß, 1821
- Bilder und Bildchen, 1823
- Katechismus der christlichen Lehre, 1823
- Die christliche Volksschule im Bunde mit der Kirche, 1823
- St. Ansgar, 1826
- Das Täubchen, 1828
- Der Hauptmann Cornelius, 1829; Cornelius the Centurion, (translated into English, Edinburgh, 1841).
- Die Geschichte des Reiches Gottes nach der heiligen Schrift, andeutender Text zu von Kügelgens, 1831–45.
- Das Leben des heiligen Johannes, 1833 The life and character of St. John, the Evangelist and Apostle, (translated into English, Edinburgh, 1839).
- Selbstbiographie, 1869
- Briefe. Nachlese (posthumous), 1911.

Arnold Wilhelm Möller published his life and letters: Friedrich Adolf Krummacher und seine Freunde, 2 volumes, Bonn, 1849.

Das Alpenlied

Auf hoher Alp
Wohnt auch der liebe Gott,
Er färbt den Morgen rot,
Die Blümlein weiß und blau,
Und labet sie mit Tau.
Auf hoher Alp ein lieber Vater wohnt.

Auf hoher Alp
Der Hirt sein Heerdlein schaut;
Sein Herz Gott vertraut;
Der Geiß und Lamm ernährt,
Ihm auch wohl gern beschert.
Auf hoher Alp ein lieber Vater wohnt!

(From "Das Alpenlied" ("The alpine song") by Friedrich Adolf Krummacher)

Alpine Heights

On Alpine heights
The love of God is shed;
He paints the morning red,
The flowerets white and blue,
And feeds them with his dew.
On Alpine heights a loving Father dwells.

On Alpine heights
The herdsman tends his herd;
His shepherd is the Lord;
For he who feeds the sheep
Will sure his offspring keep.
On Alpine heights a loving Father dwells.

(A translation of F.A. Krummacher's "Das Alpenlied" by Charles Timothy Brooks)

== Family ==
His brother Gottfried Daniel Krummacher was the leader of the pietists of Wuppertal. His son Friedrich Wilhelm Krummacher was a noted clergyman and author, as was his son Emil Wilhelm Krummacher.
