= Hermann Friedrich Krummacher =

German author and government official (1828-1890)

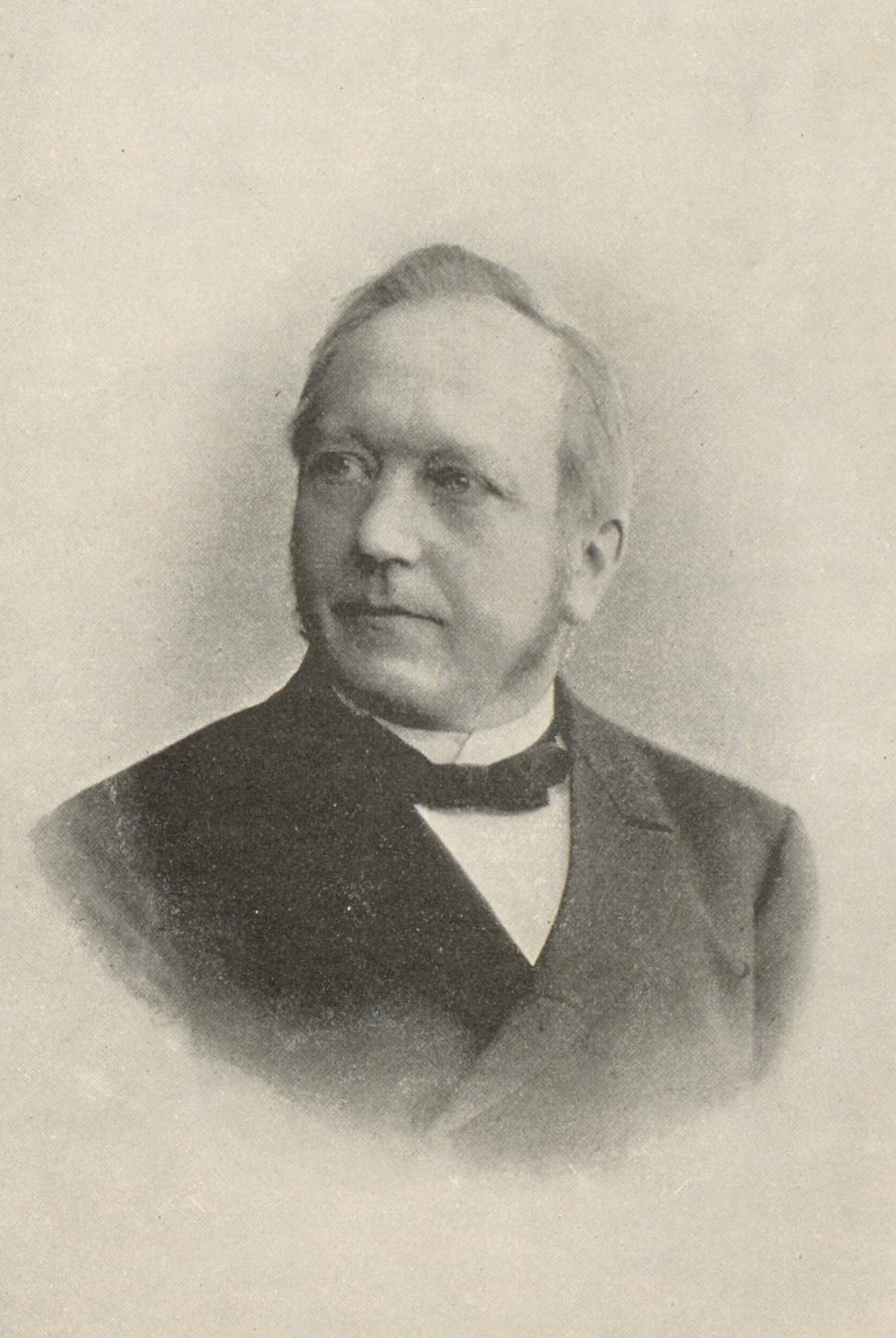
Hermann Friedrich Krummacher (1828-1890)

Hermann Friedrich Krummacher (1828-1890) was a German writer and government official. He was the son of Emil Wilhelm Krummacher. He was appointed Consistorialrath in Stettin in 1877. He was the author of Deutsches Leben in Nordamerika (German life in North America, 1874).
