= Gottfried Daniel Krummacher =

German Reformed clergyman (1774–1837)

Gottfried Daniel Krummacher (1 April 1774 in Tecklenburg – 30 January 1837 in Elberfeld) was a German Reformed clergyman. He was a brother of theologian Friedrich Adolf Krummacher.

He studied theology at the University of Duisburg and became a pastor in Baerl (today part of Duisburg; 1798), Wülfrath (1801) and Elberfeld (1816). He was the leader of the Pietists of Wuppertal.

He published several volumes of sermons, including one entitled Die Wanderungen Israels durch die Wüste nach Kanaan (1834, translated into English and published as Israel's wanderings in the wilderness, 2 volumes 1837–38); Die evangelische Heiligung (Elberfeld, 1832); Tagliches Manna (Daily Manna; 1838) and Jakobs Kampf und Sieg (translated into English and published as Jacob wrestling with the angel, 1841).
