= Tecklenburg =

Town in North Rhine-Westphalia, Germany

- Town
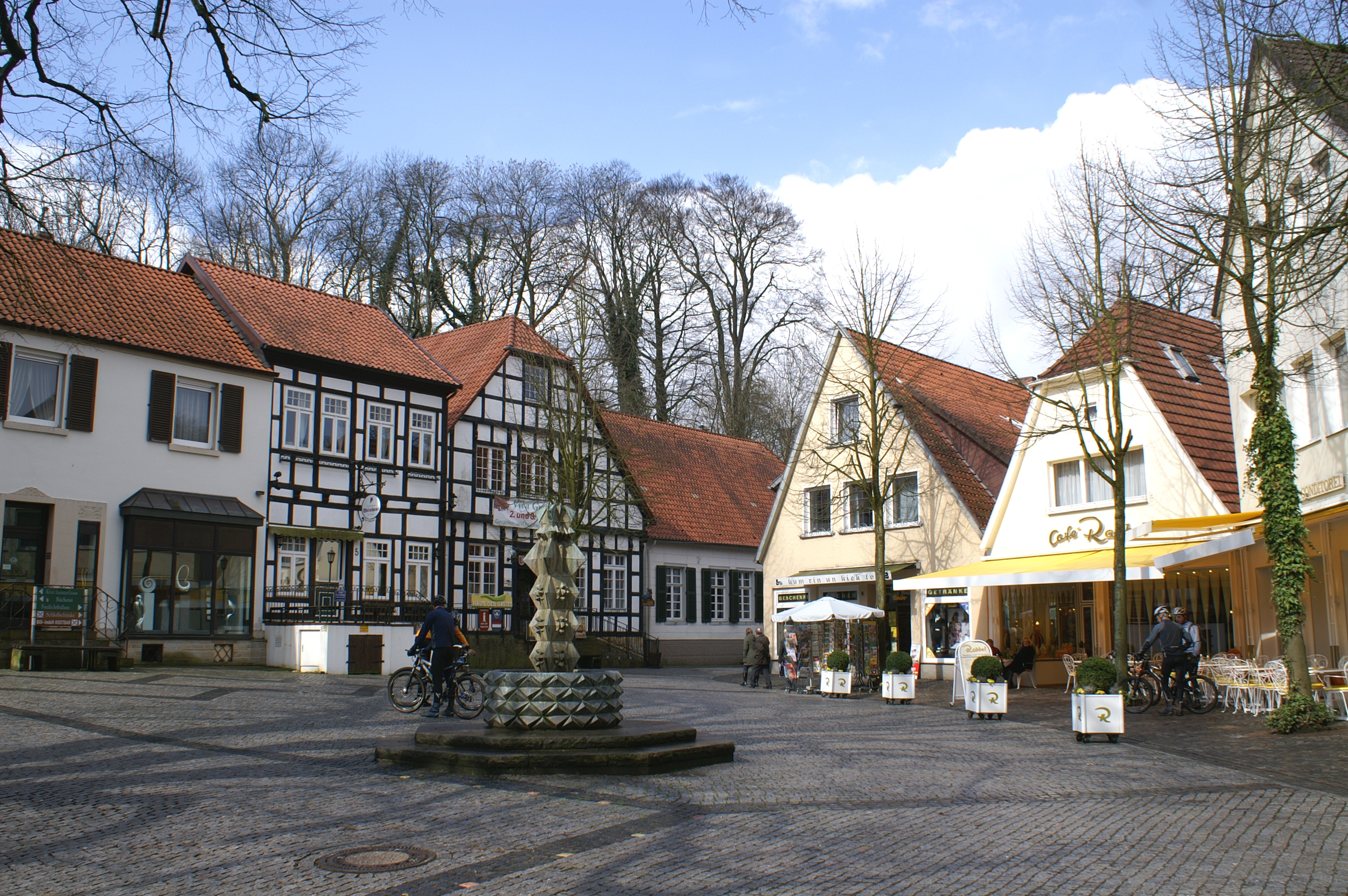

- Coat of arms

- Location of Tecklenburg within Steinfurt district
- Interactive map of Tecklenburg
- Location within Germany Location within North Rhine-Westphalia
- Coordinates: 52°13′10″N 7°48′45″E
- Country: Germany
- State: North Rhine-Westphalia
- Admin. region: Münster
- District: Steinfurt
- Subdivisions: 17

Government
  - Mayor (2020–25): Stefan Streit (SPD)

Area
  - Total: 70.49 km^{2} (27.22 sq mi)
- Elevation: 122–201 m (400–659 ft)

Population (2025-12-31)
  - Total: 9,099
  - Density: 129.1/km^{2} (334.3/sq mi)
- Time zone: UTC+01:00 (CET)
  - Summer (DST): UTC+02:00 (CEST)
- Postal codes: 49545
- Dialling codes: 05482
- Vehicle registration: ST, BF, TE
- Website: www.tecklenburg.de

Tecklenburg (German: [ˈtɛklənˌbʊʁk]) is a town in the district of Steinfurt, in North Rhine-Westphalia, Germany. Its name comes from the ruined castle around which it was built. The town is situated on the Hermannsweg hiking trail.

The coat of arms shows an anchor and three seeblatts.

== Geography ==
It is located in the foothills of the Teutoburg Forest, southwest of Osnabrück.

=== Division of the town ===
Tecklenburg consists of 4 districts (with farming communities):

- Tecklenburg
- Brochterbeck
  - Oberdorf
  - Niederdorf
  - Holthausen
  - Wallen-Lienen
  - Horstmersch
- Ledde
  - Danebrock
  - Oberbauer
  - Wieck
- Leeden
  - Loose
  - Oberberge

=== Neighbouring municipalities ===
- Ibbenbüren
- Westerkappeln
- Lotte
- Hagen
- Lengerich
- Ladbergen
- Saerbeck

== History ==
In the 12th century the county of Tecklenburg emerged in the region that is now called the "Tecklenburger Land" in the western foothills of the Teutoburg Forest. From 1263, when the county of Tecklenburg was merged with the neighbouring county of Bentheim, Tecklenburg was ruled by the counts of Bentheim-Tecklenburg. In 1701, Tecklenburg was conquered by the Kingdom of Prussia and subsequently incorporated.

== Population ==
Historical population

| Year | Pop. | ±% p.a. |
|---|---|---|
| 1965 | 8,050 | — |
| 1970 | 8,242 | +0.47% |
| 1975 | 8,601 | +0.86% |
| 1980 | 8,776 | +0.40% |
| 1985 | 8,802 | +0.06% |
| 1990 | 8,980 | +0.40% |
| 1995 | 9,159 | +0.40% |

| Year | Pop. | ±% p.a. |
|---|---|---|
| 2000 | 9,373 | +0.46% |
| 2005 | 9,501 | +0.27% |
| 2010 | 9,159 | −0.73% |
| 2015 | 9,062 | −0.21% |
| 2020 | 9,138 | +0.17% |
| 2025 | 9,099 | −0.09% |

Source: Landesdatabank Nordrhein-Westfalen

== Sights ==
Today, the town of Tecklenburg is a tourist destination, because of its largely intact medieval townscape. Main sites include the ruined castle (now serving as open-air theatre during the summer) and the Stadtkirche (the main, old church) including tombs of the counts and princes of Tecklenburg-Bentheim, as well as others prominent in the history of the county and city.

=== Tecklenburg Castle ===
Tecklenburg Castle is a ruined fortification in Tecklenburg, used today as an outdoor theatre.

The castle was built around 1250. Anna of Tecklenburg-Schwerin made a lot of structural changes. Around 1700, the castle was dilapidated and its brick and stone was used for other buildings in Tecklenburg, leaving nothing but a ruin.

== International relations ==
Tecklenburg is twinned with:

- France Chalonnes-sur-Loire (France) since 1982

== Notable people ==
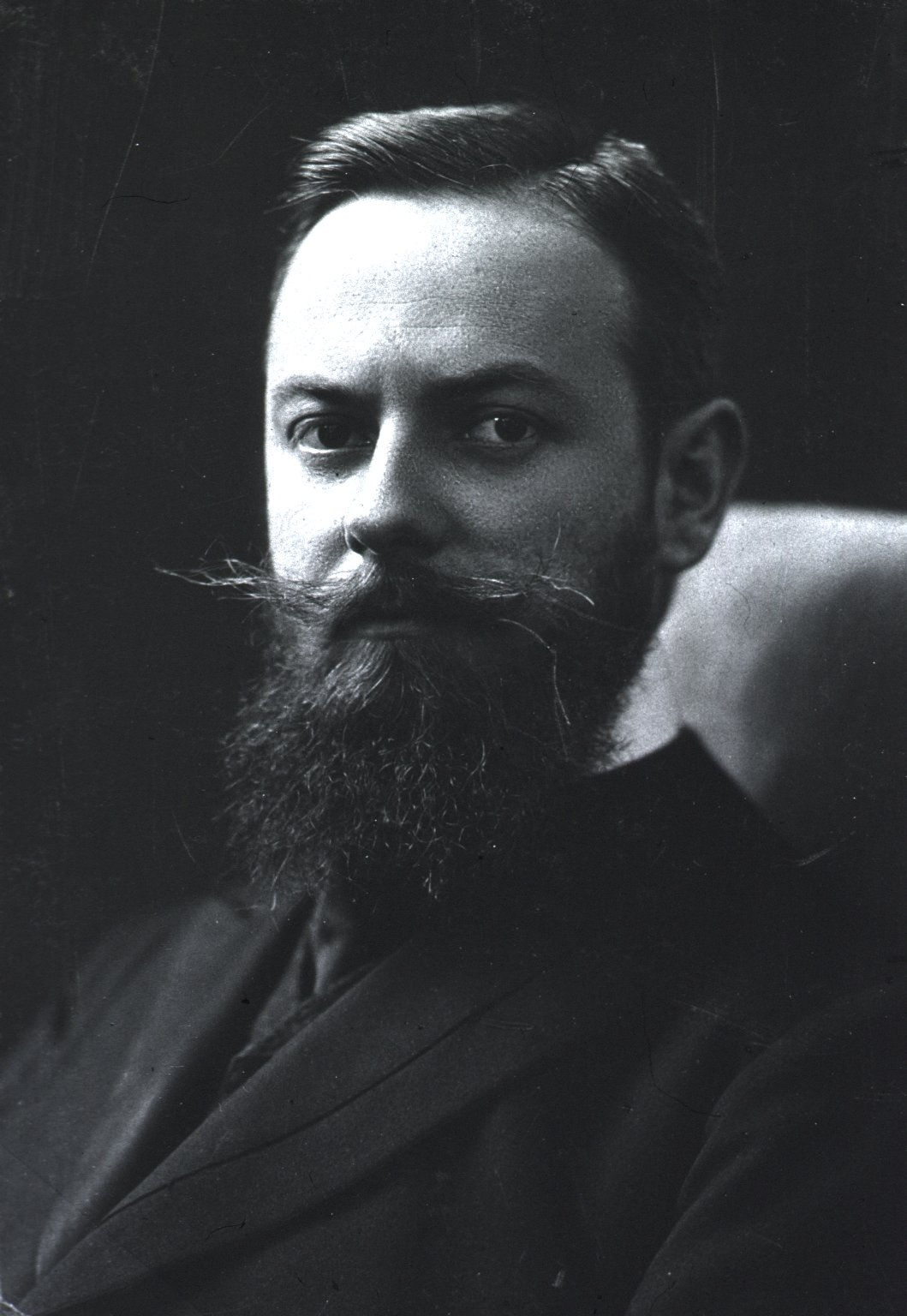
Hermann Beitzke around 1910

- Adolf von Tecklenburg (c. 1185–1224), Bishop of Osnabrück
- Friedrich Adolf Krummacher (1767–1845), theologian
- Friedrich von Bodelschwingh, Senior (1831–1910), theologian
- Hermann Beitzke (1875–1953), physician and tuberculosis researcher
- Erwin Vierow (1890–1982), General of the Infantry

== See also ==
- Bentheim-Tecklenburg
