= County of Tecklenburg =

State of the Holy Roman Empire (11th century–1808)

County of Tecklenburg Grafschaft Tecklenburg (German)
- Early 11th century–1808
- Coat of arms

- County of Tecklenburg around the middle of the 13th century

- County of Tecklenburg with Rheda about 1560
- Status: County
- Capital: Tecklenburg
- Common languages: West Low German
- Historical era: Middle Ages
  - Established: Early 11th century
  - To counts of Schwerin: 1327–1557
  - Partitioned to create the County of Lingen: 1493
  - To Solms-Braunfels by judgement: 1696
  - Sold to Brandenburg: 1707
  - Mediatised to Berg: 1808
  - Annexed by France to form département of Lippe: 1810–15
Preceded by	Succeeded by
Duchy of Saxony	Grand Duchy of Berg

The County of Tecklenburg (German: Grafschaft Tecklenburg) was a state of the Holy Roman Empire, located in the present German state of North Rhine-Westphalia and Lower Saxony.

== History ==
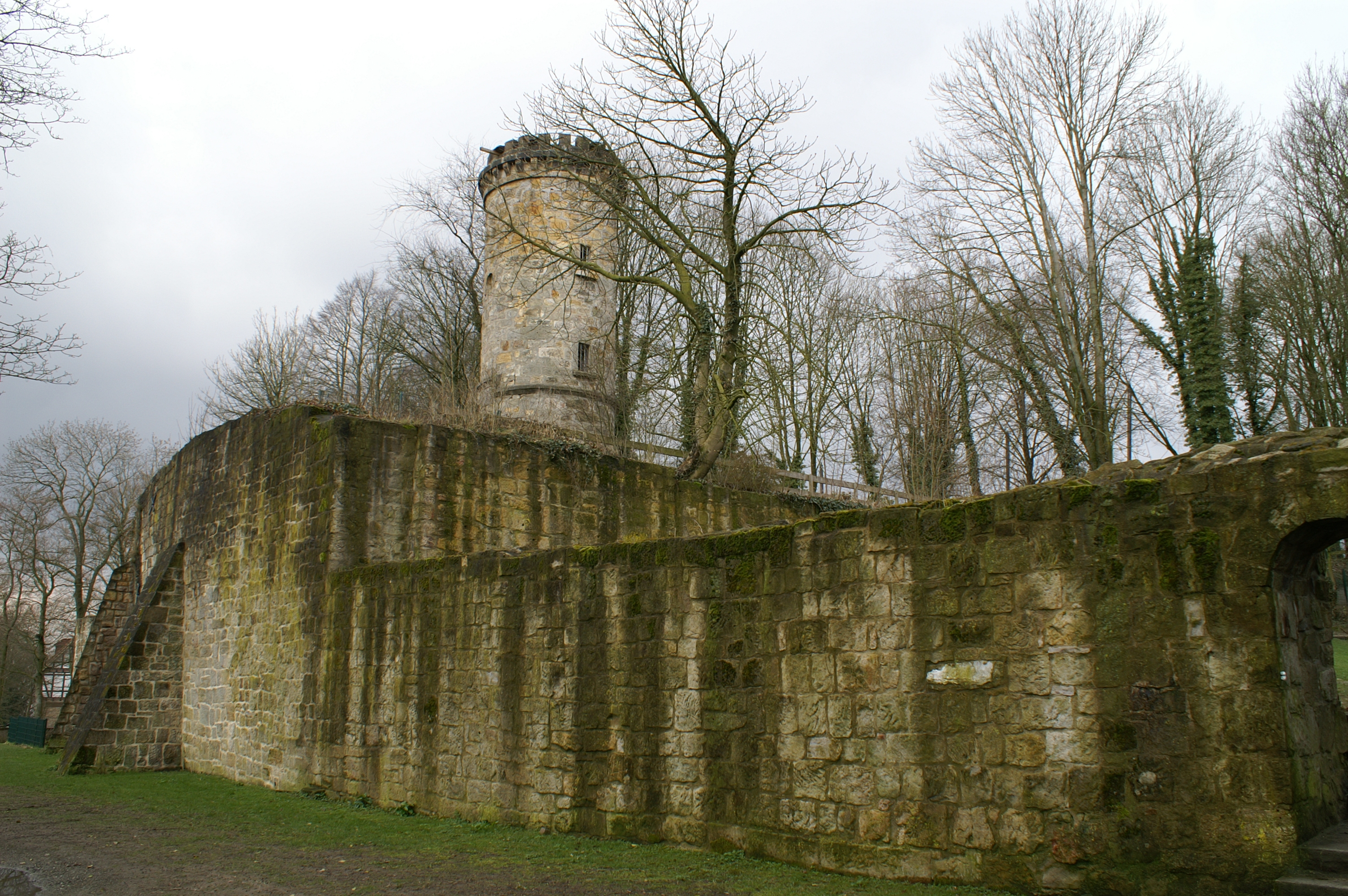
Ruins of Burg Tecklenburg.

In the 12th century the county of Tecklenburg emerged in the region that is now called the "Tecklenburger Land" in the western foothills of the Teutoburg Forest.

Following the extinction of the counts of Tecklenburg in 1262, it was annexed by the neighbouring County of Bentheim in 1263. Between 1328 and 1562 it was ruled by the Counts of Schwerin. In 1365 they acquired the Lordship of Rheda, but in 1400 they lost the northern parts of the county with the districts of Cloppenburg, Friesoythe and Bevergern to the Prince-Bishopric of Münster.

Conrad of Tecklenburg-Schwerin was the first ruler in Westphalia to introduce the Reformation and became a member of the Schmalkaldic League. Following the defeat of the League, the county of Tecklenburg was forced to cede territories to Charles V to form the County of Lingen. In 1557, in conflict with the claims of the House of Solms-Braunfels, the county was inherited by Arnold II (IV) of Bentheim-Tecklenburg whose son Adolf founded a new line of counts of Tecklenburg. In 1588 the counts introduced Calvinism to Tecklenburg. This succession dispute would continue.

In 1686, the Reichskammergericht ('Imperial Chamber Court') issued a verdict which settled the conflict, splitting the territory between Bentheim-Tecklenburg and Solms-Braunfels. In 1696, Solms-Braunfels ceded their claim to Brandenburg-Prussia. When Prussia and Solms-Braunfels occupied Tecklenburg in 1701, Bentheim-Tecklenburg appealed to the Aulic Council. The conflict escalated in 1707 when Count William Maurice of Solms-Braunfels formally sold Tecklenburg to Prussia. The Aulic Council declared this sale illegal. Prussia's activity was condemned by members of the Lower Rhenish–Westphalian Circle, in particular Münster and the Palatinate. At the Imperial Diet of 1722, Prussia, Solms-Braunfels, and the Reichskammergericht, challenged the Aulic Council's decision. Prussia claimed that since the Reichskammergericht had already reached a verdict on the case, the Aulic Council should have never reopened the case. The Aulic Council argued that the Reichskammergericht was not authorized to pass verdicts on disputed immediate Imperial estates, but the Reichskammergericht responded by claiming that Tecklenburg was not a county immediate to the Emperor, but only an allodial property. The case was unable to be settled in the diet.

The Aulic Council continued to publish verdicts against Prussia throughout 1725, but failure of the council to enforce the case, coupled with the Emperor needing Prussian support with the Pragmatic Sanction, led to a 1729 treaty in Berlin between Prussia and Bentheim-Tecklenburg. Bentheim-Tecklenburg would give up its claim to Tecklenburg, but would receive 750,000 Reichstaler. The Emperor ratified the treaty in 1730, and Prussia annexed Tecklenburg.

The county was mediatised to the Grand Duchy of Berg in 1808. Tecklenburg was annexed by France in 1810 together with many northwest German regions. The Congress of Vienna returned Tecklenburg to Prussia in 1816.

== See also ==
- Bentheim-Tecklenburg

== Bibliography ==
- Holsche, August Karl (1788). Historisch-topographisch-statistische Beschreibung der Graffschaft Tecklenburg nebst einigen speciellen Landesverordnungen mit Anmerkungen, als ein Beytrag zur vollständigen Beschreibung Westphalens' (in German). Berlin and Frankfurt.
- Essellen (1877). Geschichte der Grafschaft Tecklenburg (in German). Leipzig.
- Bruns, Alfred (1982). Gerhard Taddey (ed.). Lexikon der deutschen Geschichte (in German) (2nd ed.). Stuttgart. p. 1221.
