= Bentheim-Tecklenburg =

Former principality in North Rhine-Westphalia, Germany

Coat of arms of the Princes of Bentheim-Tecklenburg-Rheda

Bentheim-Tecklenburg was a German county, later principality, based in the region around Tecklenburg in northern North Rhine-Westphalia, Germany.

== History ==
Bentheim-Tecklenburg emerged as a partition of the County of Bentheim in 1277, and was partitioned between itself and Bentheim-Lingen in 1450. Count Conrad converted his county to Lutheranism in 1541. In 1557, it was inherited by Bentheim-Steinfurt.

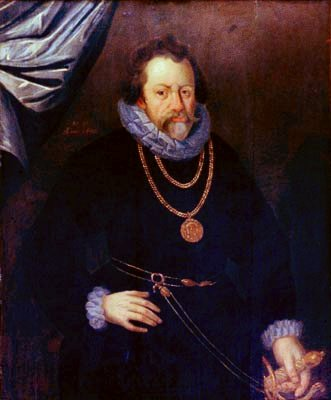
Arnold III, Count of Bentheim-Steinfurt-Tecklenburg-Limburg (1554-1606)

Arnold III, Count of Bentheim-Steinfurt-Tecklenburg-Limburg (1554-1606) held the counties of Bentheim, Tecklenburg, Steinfurt, Limburg (with Hohenlimburg Castle), the Lordship of Rheda, possessions on the Lower Rhine and bailiff rights in the Archbishopric of Cologne. After his death his possessions were divided between his three eldest sons while the younger sons received lands from their mother. Adolf (1577-1623) received Tecklenburg and Rheda, Wilhelm Heinrich (1584-1632) Steinfurt (with Burgsteinfurt Castle), but left no offspring, Konrad Gumprecht (1585-1618) received Limburg, but his only son died early. Adolf had four sons of whom Moritz (1615-1674) inherited Tecklenburg and Rheda in 1623 and Limburg in 1629. Moritz' two sons Johann Adolf (1637-1704) and Friedrich Moritz (1653-1710) partitioned the territories again, but in 1701 Brandenburgian troops occupied Tecklenburg, as there had been a dispute about the county with the counts of Solms-Braunfels since 1577, and the latter sold their rights to Brandenburg.

After the loss of Tecklenburg, the family still ruled in Limburg and Rheda, however about 100 kilometers apart from each other. In 1756 the residence was moved from Hohenlimburg to Rheda, which remains the main seat of the family to this day. In 1803 the secularized monasteries of Herzebrock and Clarholz, both located within the territories, were taken over by the counts. However, their sovereignty ended with the mediatisation in 1808 when the county became part of the Grand Duchy of Berg, and after the Congress of Vienna (1815) of the Kingdom of Prussia. In 1817, the count was created 1st Prince of Bentheim-Tecklenburg and Rheda by the Prussian king. In 1854 he received a hereditary seat in the Prussian House of Lords. The castles of Hohenlimburg and Rheda and the abbeys of Herzebrock and Clarholz are still today owned by the House of Bentheim-Tecklenburg-Rheda.

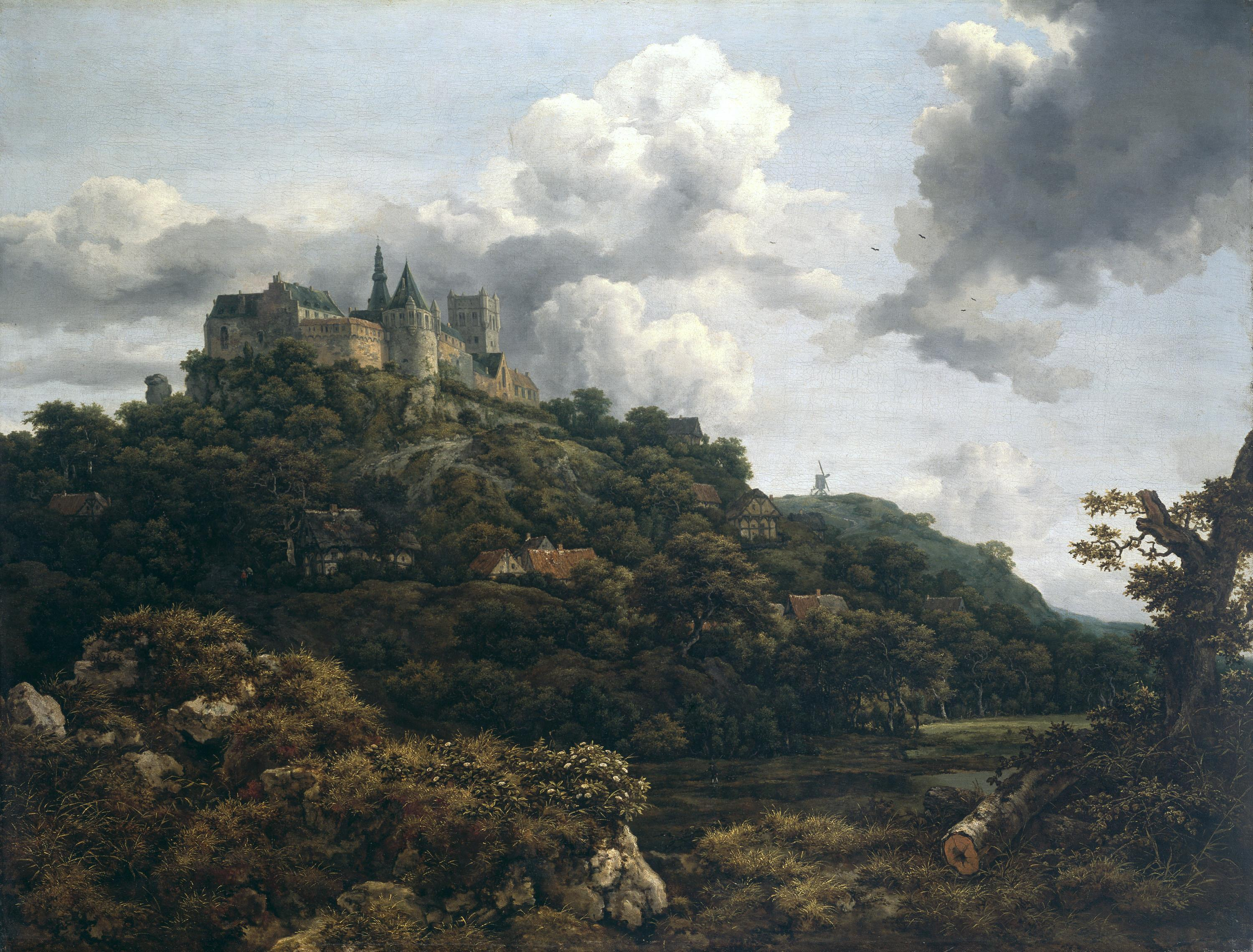
Bentheim Castle (by Jacob van Ruisdael (1653)

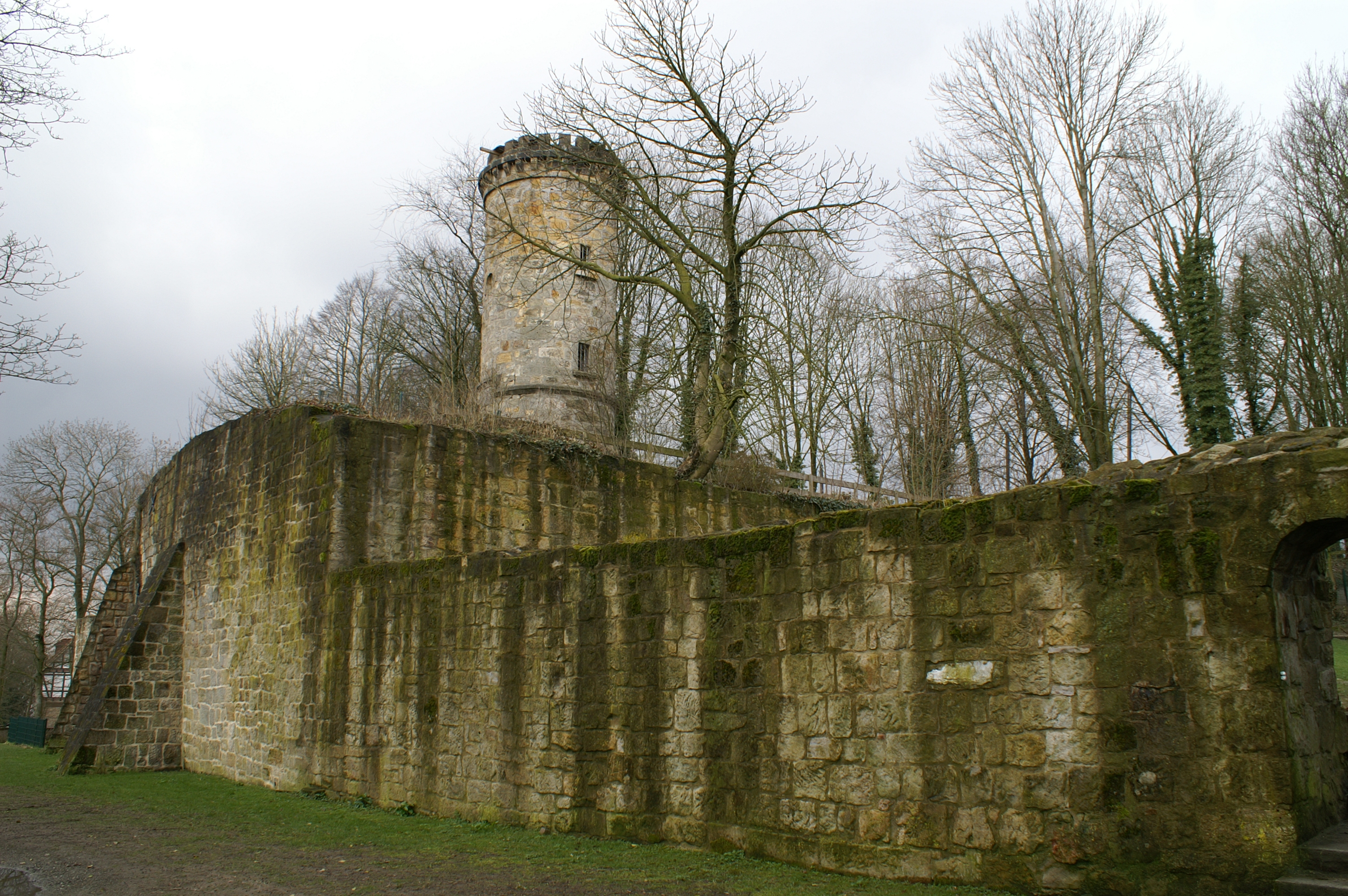
Tecklenburg Castle

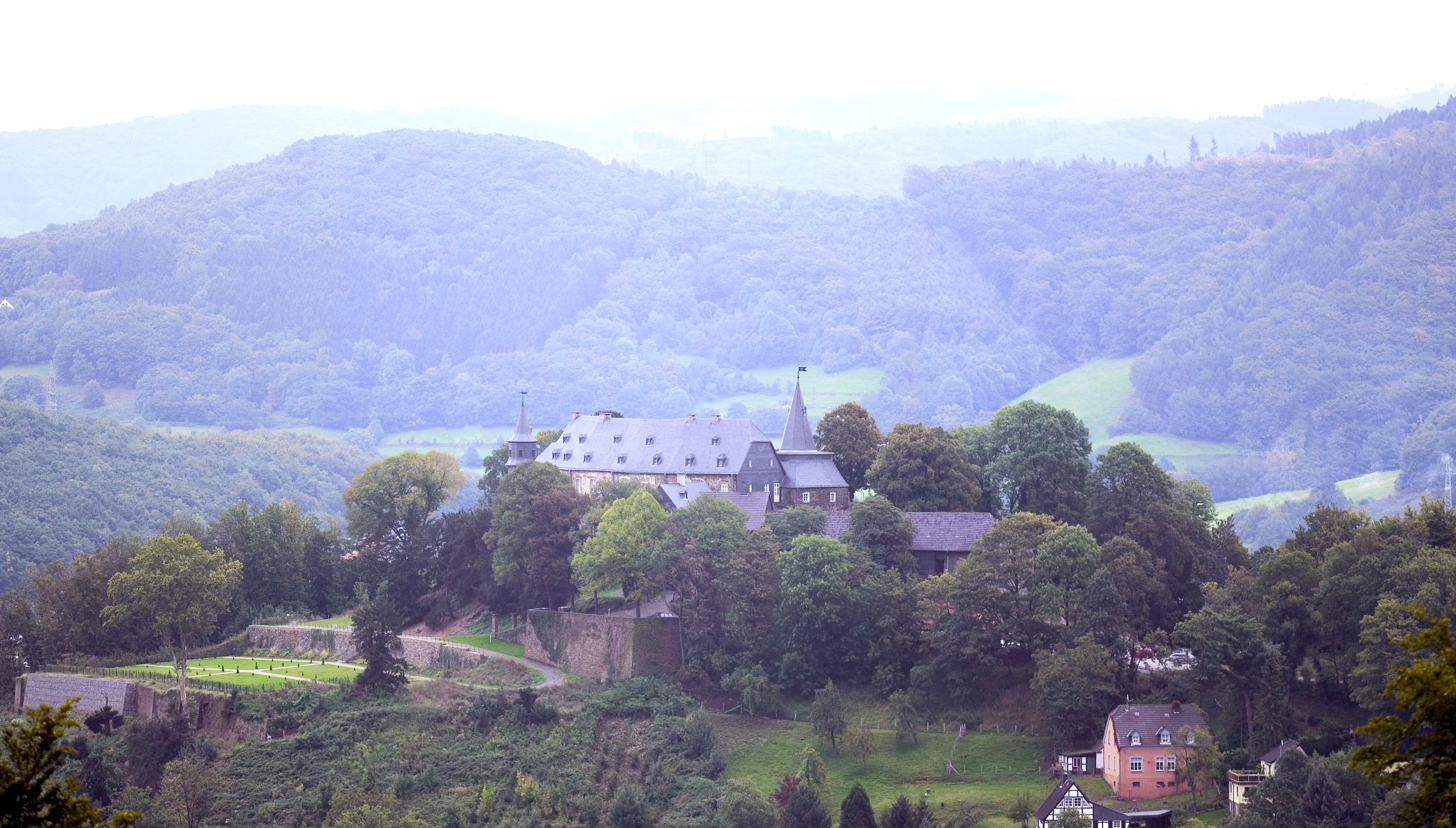
Hohenlimburg Castle

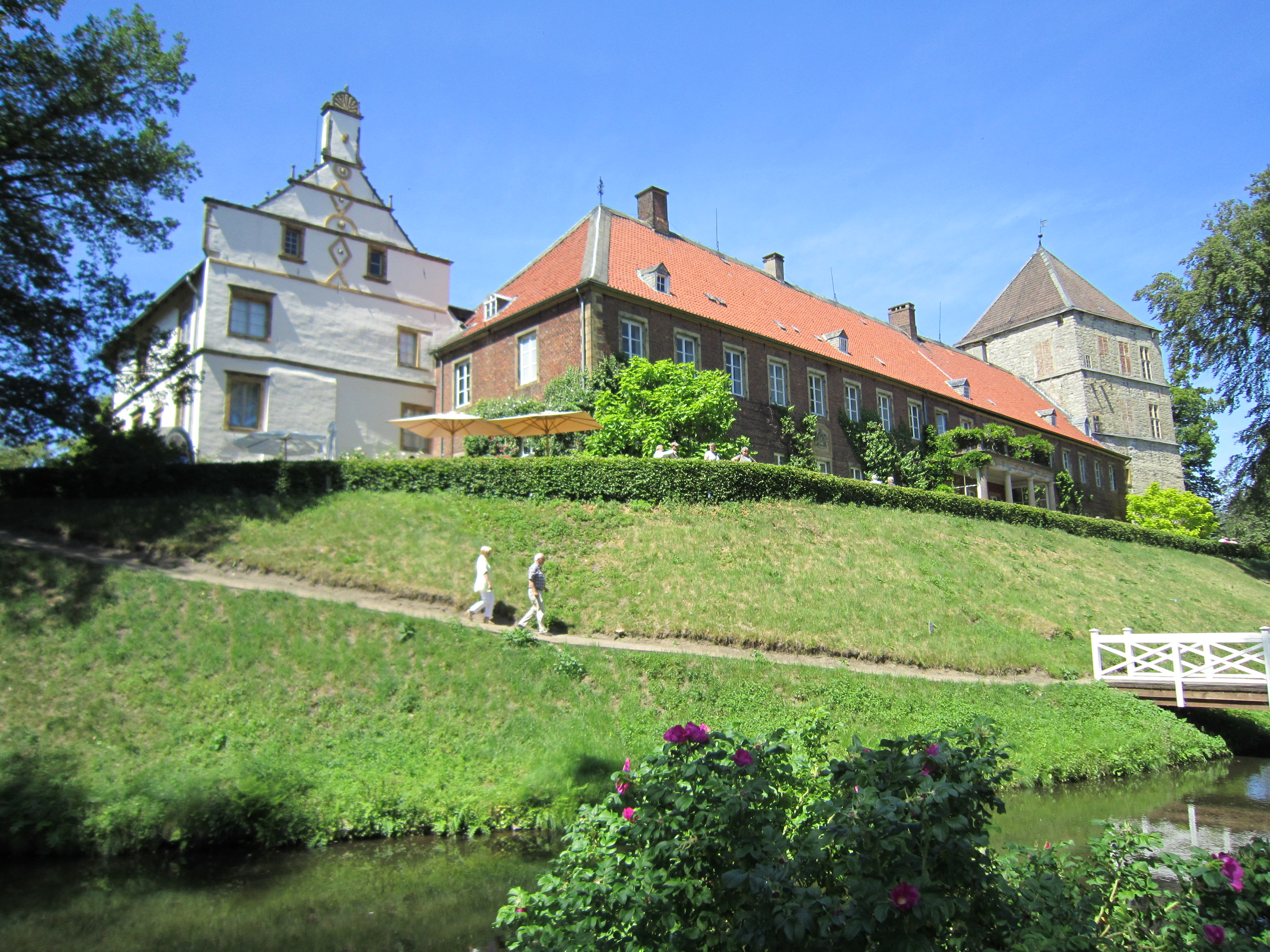
Rheda Castle

== Counts of Bentheim-Tecklenburg (1277–1557) ==
- Otto III (1277–1338)
- Otto IV (1289–1302)
- Otto V (1302–1328)
- Richardis (1328–1338)
- Nicholas I (Count of Alt-Bruchhausen and Schwerin) (1338–1360)
- Otto VI (1360–1388)
- Nicholas II (1388–1426)
- Otto VII (1426–1450)
- Nicholas III (Count of Bentheim-Lingen) (1450–1493)
- Otto VIII (1493–1526)
- Conrad (Count of Bentheim-Lingen) (1526–1557)

== Counts of Bentheim-Tecklenburg (1562–1817) ==
- Arnold III, Count of Bentheim-Steinfurt-Tecklenburg-Limburg (1562–1606)

=== Counts of Bentheim-Tecklenburg-Rheda ===
- Adolf, Count of Bentheim-Tecklenburg (1606–1623)
- Moritz, Count of Bentheim-Tecklenburg, Rheda and Limburg (1623–1674)
- Johann Adolf, Count of Bentheim-Tecklenburg and Rheda (1674–1704)
- Friedrich Moritz, Count of Bentheim-Tecklenburg (1704–1710), sold his rights on Tecklenburg to Brandenburg in 1707
- Moritz Kasimir I of Bentheim-Tecklenburg (1710–1768), brother of Friedrich Moritz
- Moritz Kasimir II of Bentheim-Tecklenburg (1768–1805), son of Friedrich Moritz
- Emil Friedrich I of Bentheim-Tecklenburg (1805–1817), count of Limburg and Rheda, regent of Bentheim-Tecklenburg, 1817 1st Prince of Bentheim-Tecklenburg and Rheda

== (Mediatized) Princes of Bentheim-Tecklenburg and Rheda (1817–) ==
- Emil, 1st Prince 1817–1837 (1765-1837)
  - Moritz Kasimir, 2nd Prince 1837–1872 (1795-1872)
  - Franz, 3rd Prince 1872-1885 (1800-1885)
  - Prince Adolf Ludwig (1804-1874)
    - Gustav, 4th Prince 1885-1909 (1849-1909)
      - Adolf, 5th Prince 1909-1967 (1889-1967)
        - Moritz Casimir, 6th Prince 1967-2014 (1923-2014)
          - Prince Carl-Gustav Moritz-Casimir (1960-) - renounced succession rights
          - Maximilian, 7th Prince 2014- (1969-) ∞ Marissa Clara Fortescue, granddaughter of Denzil Fortescue, 6th Earl Fortescue
            - Prince Moritz (2003-)
            - Prince Carl-Emil (2010-)
