= Hanlon-Lees Action Theater =

American entertainment company

Hanlon-Lees Action Theater is an American entertainment company credited with the development of theatrical jousting. The company was formed in 1979 by partners Kent Shelton, Robin Wood, Richard "Dikki" Ellis, R. Vincent Park, Taso N. Stavrakis, and Stephen "Omms" Ommerle.

Inspired by the 19th century Hanlon-Lees—a troupe of pre-Vaudevillian acrobatic performers—the young partners conducted thorough research into the background of their Victorian counterparts and recreated many of their stunts and patented theatrical apparatus (for example, a device capable of simulating an onstage decapitation) for modern usage. Vince Park managed to locate the final surviving descendant of the original Hanlons and received her blessing to continue using the moniker "Hanlon-Lees"; Omms is generally credited with the invention of the addendum "Action Theater."

Early Off-Broadway theatrical performances by the new Hanlon-Lees included an original Three Musketeers show entitled The Queen's Diamonds (featuring another friend from North Carolina, Terrence Mann who would shortly afterwards be prominently cast in Cats) and a comedic free-for-all, Etched In Stone. The group alternated these infrequent stage productions with appearances at the New York Renaissance Faire, where their primary attraction was a tournament of knightly skills culminating in a mounted jousting match.

These early shows centered upon the training of a squire who would, over the course of a three-act program, be challenged to a joust and win his knighthood from the King. While other medieval festivals featured historically authentic jousting reenactments (usually featuring combatants chosen at random and separated by a tilt rail), the Hanlon-Lees were the first performers to incorporate a choreographed joust and ground battle into a scripted dramatic performance.

Horses were purchased and trained to become acclimated to the crashing of weapons and shields, as well as to the cheering of thousands of patrons; durable swords had to be crafted from spring steel because lightweight aluminum props would not withstand the heavy combat required in the ground fights. The result, eventually termed "theatrical jousting" by Kent Shelton, was co-opted by dozens of rival companies in the years to follow.

In the early 1990s, the company also began performing a Wild West event based upon the legendary extravaganzas of Buffalo Bill Cody. These performances typically include demonstrations of trick-shooting, lasso-twirling, and whip-cracking, among other such spectacles.

Originally based in New York City and later Chicago, the company ultimately relocated to a private ranch (dubbed the "Wild West Knights' Rest") in Luther, Oklahoma.
