= NYRF =

NYRF can refer to:

- New York Renaissance Faire
- New York Radical Feminists
