= Taso N. Stavrakis =

American actor

- Born: Taso Nicholas Stavrakis; July 12, 1957 (age 68); Canton, Ohio, U.S.
- Occupations: Actor; stunt performer
- Years active: 1974–2017

Taso Nicholas Stavrakis (born July 12, 1957) is an American film and television actor and stunt performer best known for his appearances in the George A. Romero films Dawn of the Dead (1978), Knightriders (1981), and Day of the Dead (1985).

== Career ==
=== TV and Film ===
Recruited by his good friend and Carnegie-Mellon University classmate Tom Savini, Stavrakis assisted with stunts and special makeup effects on several seminal 1980s horror productions, including the original Friday the 13th, in which he portrayed "The Prowler" (as the unidentified killer was initially referred to in Victor Miller's screenplay). Romero frequently joked that Stavrakis should be included in the Guinness Book of World Records for having appeared as the most zombies in his Dead series (5 in Dawn and 6 in Day).

Offered the opportunity to portray villain Jason Voorhees in Friday the 13th Part 2, Stavrakis turned down the role as his friend Savini had declined to create the film's makeup effects. He instead took an opportunity to create special makeup effects for He Knows You're Alone, an early thriller by Armand Mastroianni (and incidentally Tom Hanks's first feature film), with whom Stavrakis would work again on the 2006 cinematic adaptation of The Celestine Prophecy

Stavrakis eventually gravitated almost exclusively toward stunt work, serving as stunt coordinator on Day of the Dead and the Romero-scripted Creepshow 2 (1987), while his acting work during this period included a brief stint on As the World Turns as Stavros, a Greek interpreter.

His more recent film work includes appearances in Martin Campbell's The Mask of Zorro, Gore Verbinski's Pirates of the Caribbean: The Curse of the Black Pearl (in a "Tortuga Island" sequence which was edited from the first film but utilized in the sequel) and Michael Mann's 2006 Miami Vice redux, as well as wrangling duties on pictures such as Jackass Number Two and the Seth Green road-trip comedy Sex Drive.

In 2010, Stavrakis appeared as a featured zombie in the pilot episode of the AMC Network series The Walking Dead. As the "living dead" subgenre has increased in popularity over the years, Taso now makes occasional appearances at horror-themed conventions around the world. In 2018, his brother Christian sculpted and installed a bronze bust of George Romero in the Monroeville Mall, the first public monument to Romero's work and career.

== Jousting and stage ==
A tournament fencer and seasoned equestrian, Stavrakis is a founding member of the Hanlon-Lees Action Theater, an American entertainment company which pioneered the art of theatrical jousting. He also performed for several years with the Big Apple Circus during the mid-1990s as a variety of characters (including "Captain Coney," a Coney Island-inspired superhero), and remains a member of BAC's Clown Care unit, providing entertainment and encouragement to children in hospital.

== West Virginia Renaissance Festival ==
In 2018 Taso fulfilled a lifelong dream by founding the West Virginia Renaissance Festival, the first and only medieval faire in that state. Located in Lewisburg, WV, the festival currently runs for four weekends every June.

== Selected filmography ==
- 1978 Dawn of the Dead as Motorcycle Raider
- 1980 Friday the 13th
- 1980 He Knows You're Alone
- 1981 Knightriders as Ewain
- 1985 Day of the Dead as Private Juan Torrez
- 1987 Creepshow 2
- 1988 As the World Turns as Stavros
- 1991 Bloodsucking Pharaohs in Pittsburgh as Semmet Cairo
- 1991 The Big Apple Circus
- 1997 The Shewing Up of Blanco Posnet as Blanco Posnet
- 1998 The Mask of Zorro as Firing Squad Soldier #1
- 2003 Pirates of the Caribbean: The Curse of the Black Pearl
- 2003 Half of Everything as The Sheriff
- 2004 Dawn of the Dead
- 2006 Miami Vice as Long-Haired Sniper (uncredited)
- 2006 The Celestine Prophecy
- 2010 The Walking Dead as Walker
- 2011 The Fergusons as "Nice Shoes"
- 2014 The Control Group as Agent Torrez
