= FMJ =

FMJ may refer to:

- Full metal jacket (ammunition), a bullet consisting of a soft core encased in a shell of harder metal
- Full Metal Jacket, a 1987 war film produced, directed and co-written by Stanley Kubrick
- Full Metal Jousting, an American reality television show that debuted on the History Channel
- Funhit Mein Jaari, a Hindi-language television comedy series
- "FMJ", a 2025 song by OsamaSon, from Psykotic
