= Shane Adams =

Canadian Equestrian Team athlete

Shane Adams is a Canadian Equestrian Team athlete in modern competitive jousting. He is currently the Captain and owner of North America's Premier Full Contact Jousting Team, The Knights of Valour.

He is the former president of the World Championship Jousting Association, and he has founded several competitive jousting tournaments in the United States and Canada. He holds 17 international titles.

Adams started as a theatrical jouster for the Toronto Medieval Times dinner show when he was 23.

He was the host and executive producer of The History Channel's competitive reality TV show Full Metal Jousting.
