= Ritterfestspiele Bad Bentheim =

- Bentheim Castle in the background of the annual festival
- Status: Active
- Genre: Renaissance fair, Medieval reenactment
- Date: Around Ascension Day
- Frequency: Annual
- Location: Bentheim Castle grounds
- Coordinates: 52°18′11″N 7°09′15″E
- Country: Germany
- Years active: 2006–present
- Founder: Excalibur Horse Shows GmbH
- Attendance: 10,000–15,000
- Website: www.badbentheim.de/veranstaltungen/highlights/ritterfestspiele

The Ritterfestspiele Bad Bentheim ("Knight Games of Bad Bentheim") are an annual renaissance fair with regular Medieval reenactment and fire performances taking place in the renaissance garden underneath the hilltop castle of Bentheim.

== History ==
In 2006 the Excalibur Horse Shows GmbH suggested to establish a renaissance fair and a Medieval Reenactment in the German-Dutch border Region. Since then the Ritterfestspiele Bad Bentheim hosted each year about 10.000–15.000 spectators from Germany and the close-by Netherlands. The festival always lasts four days around Ascension Day, is still organized by Excalibur and has become a fixture in the EUREGIO region's event calendar.

== Tournament ==
Theatrical jousting in Bentheim

The tournament shows two teams competing on horseback in different disciplines in order to determine who shall reign the lands. All performers show their skills with spears and swords and other weapons until the main opponents engage in theatrical jousting and swordplay.At night the Knights reappear for a second tournament that comes with an elaborate fire performance. The Bad Bentheim's own local volunteer fire department takes care of security.

== Renaissance Fair ==
Artisans like blacksmiths, weavers and potters show their craft. Visitors can purchase tools, toys, talismans, clothes, pottery, acessories and other things. Medieval beverages and fresh Medieval food are also offered.

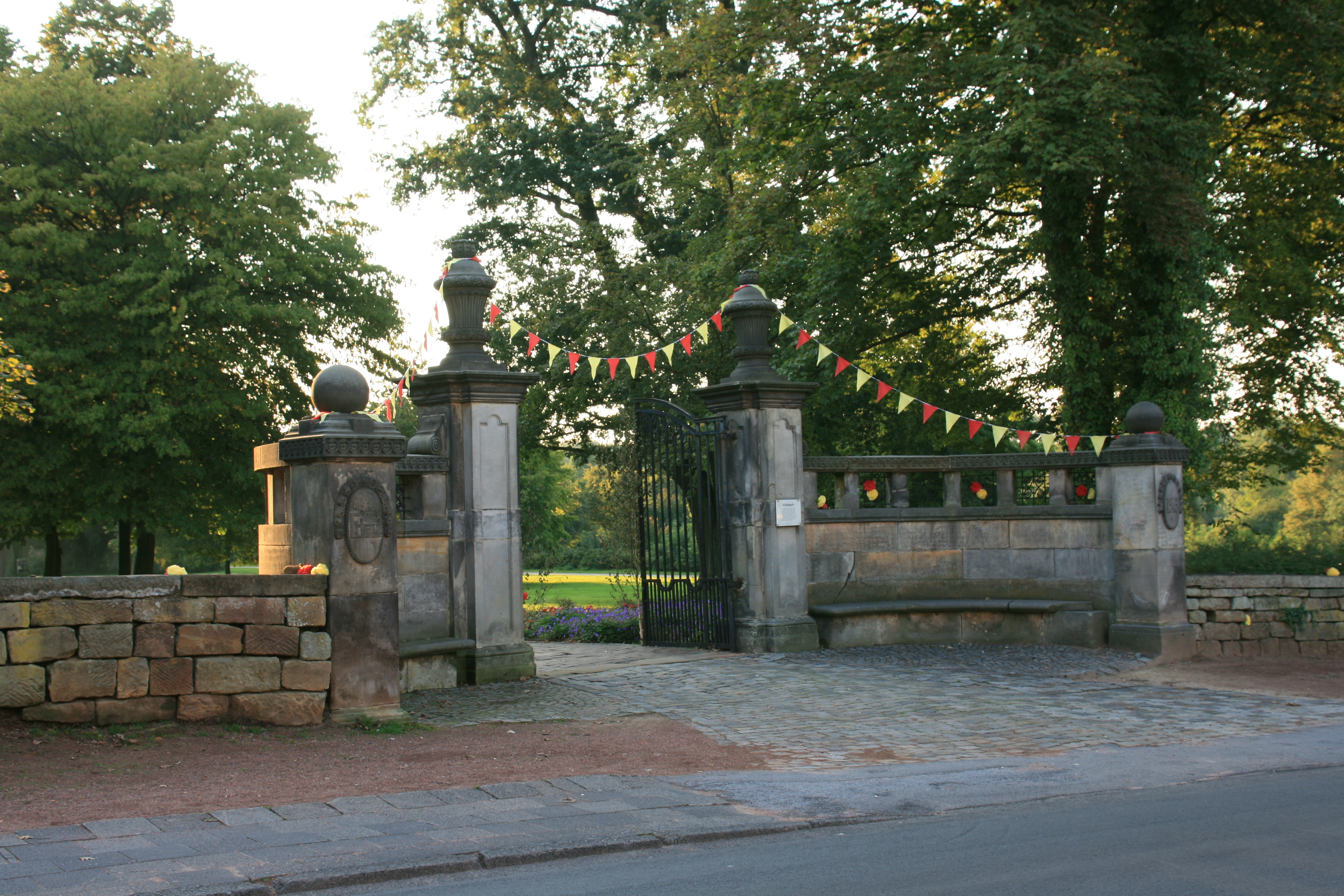
Entry to the castle's garden

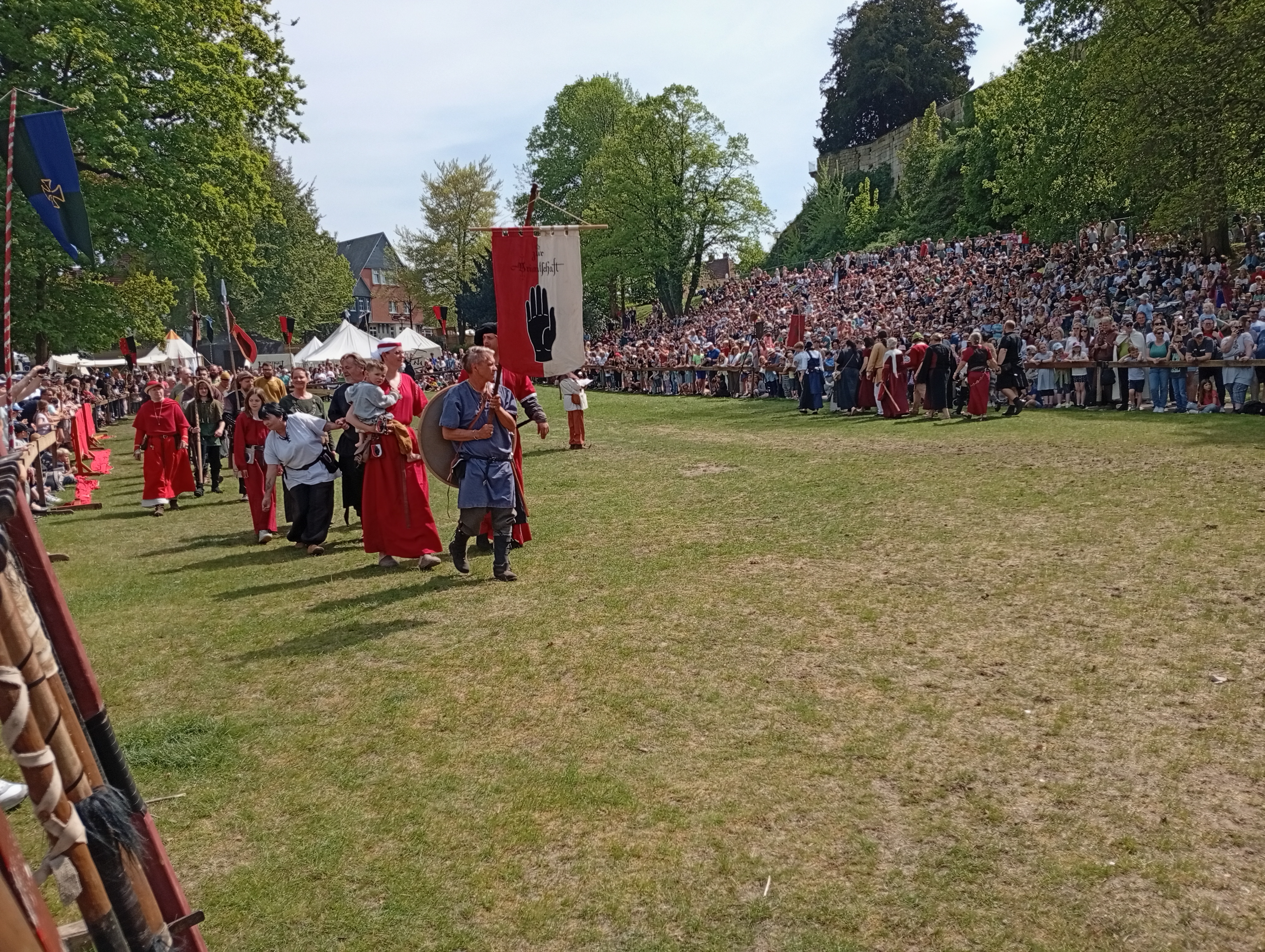
Opening Procession

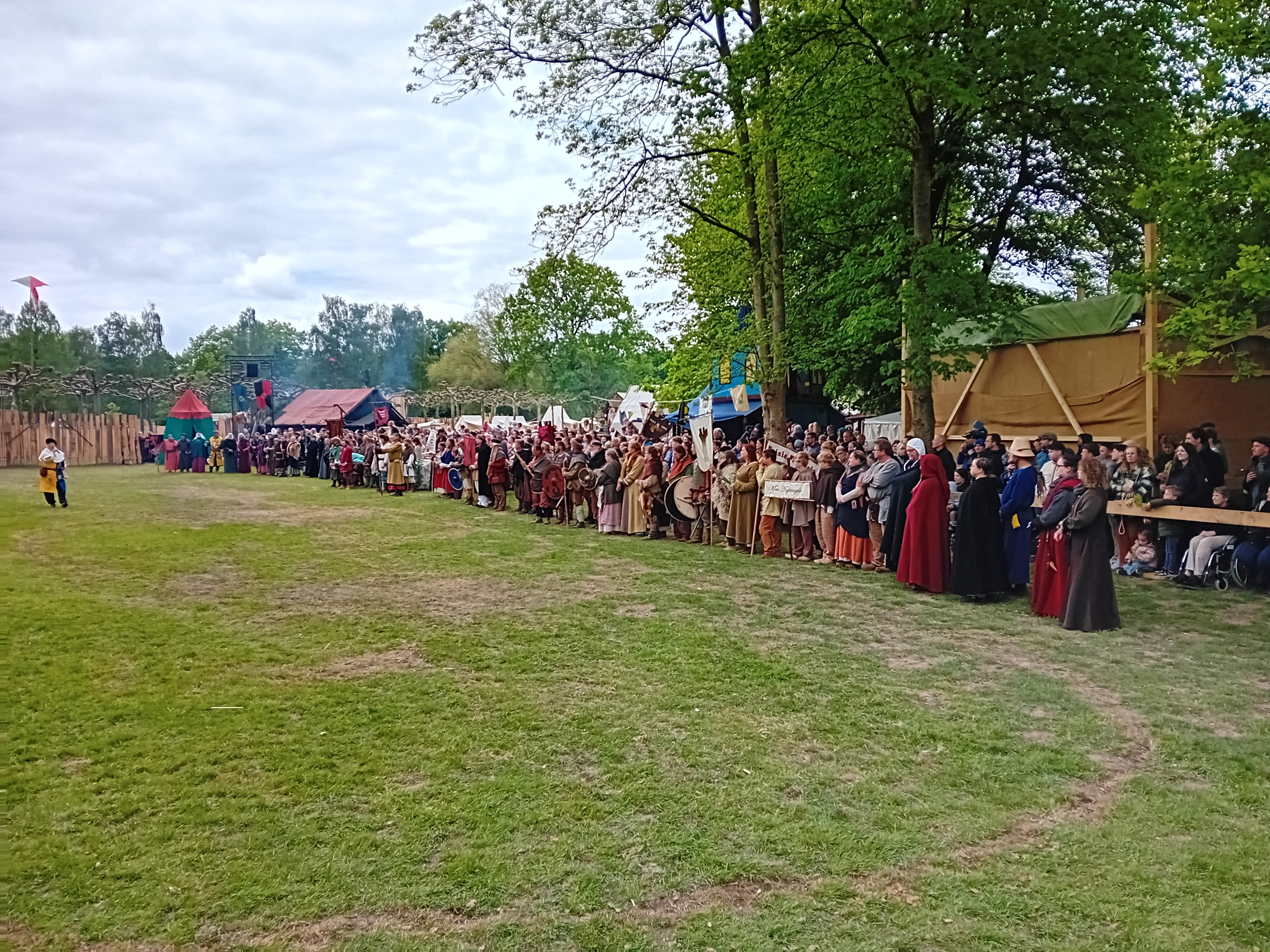
Awaiting the knights

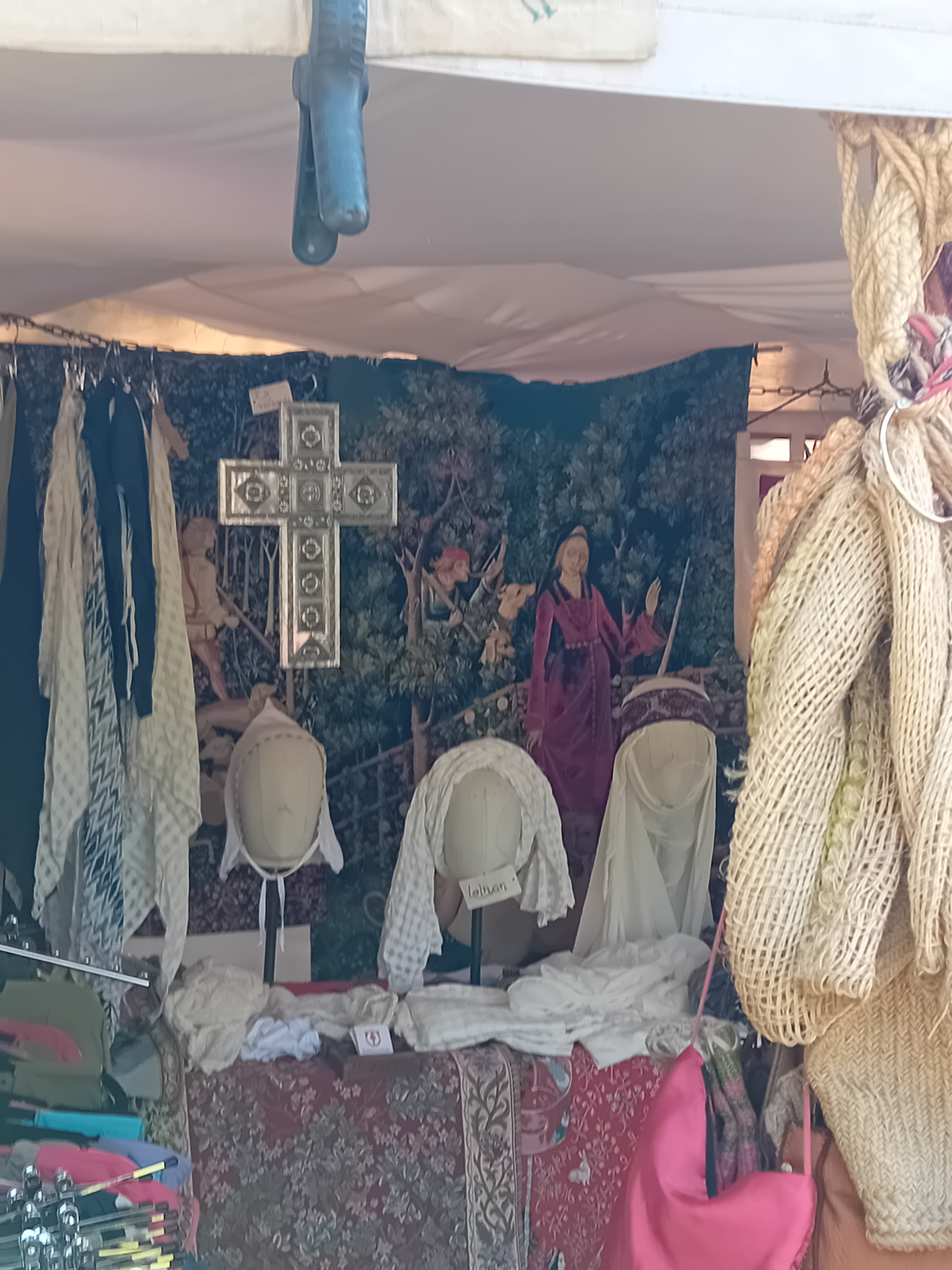
Medieval clothes

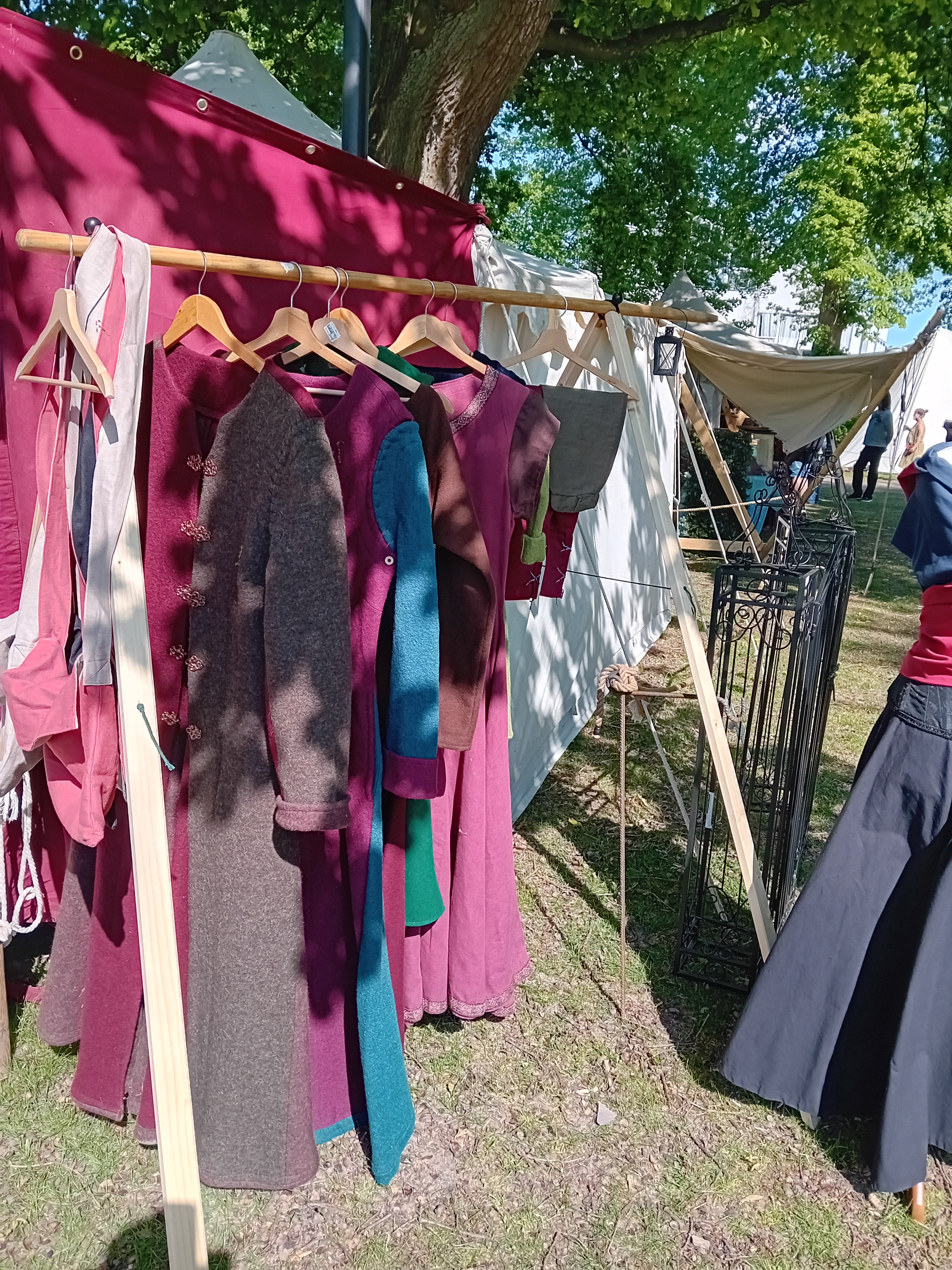
Medieval robes

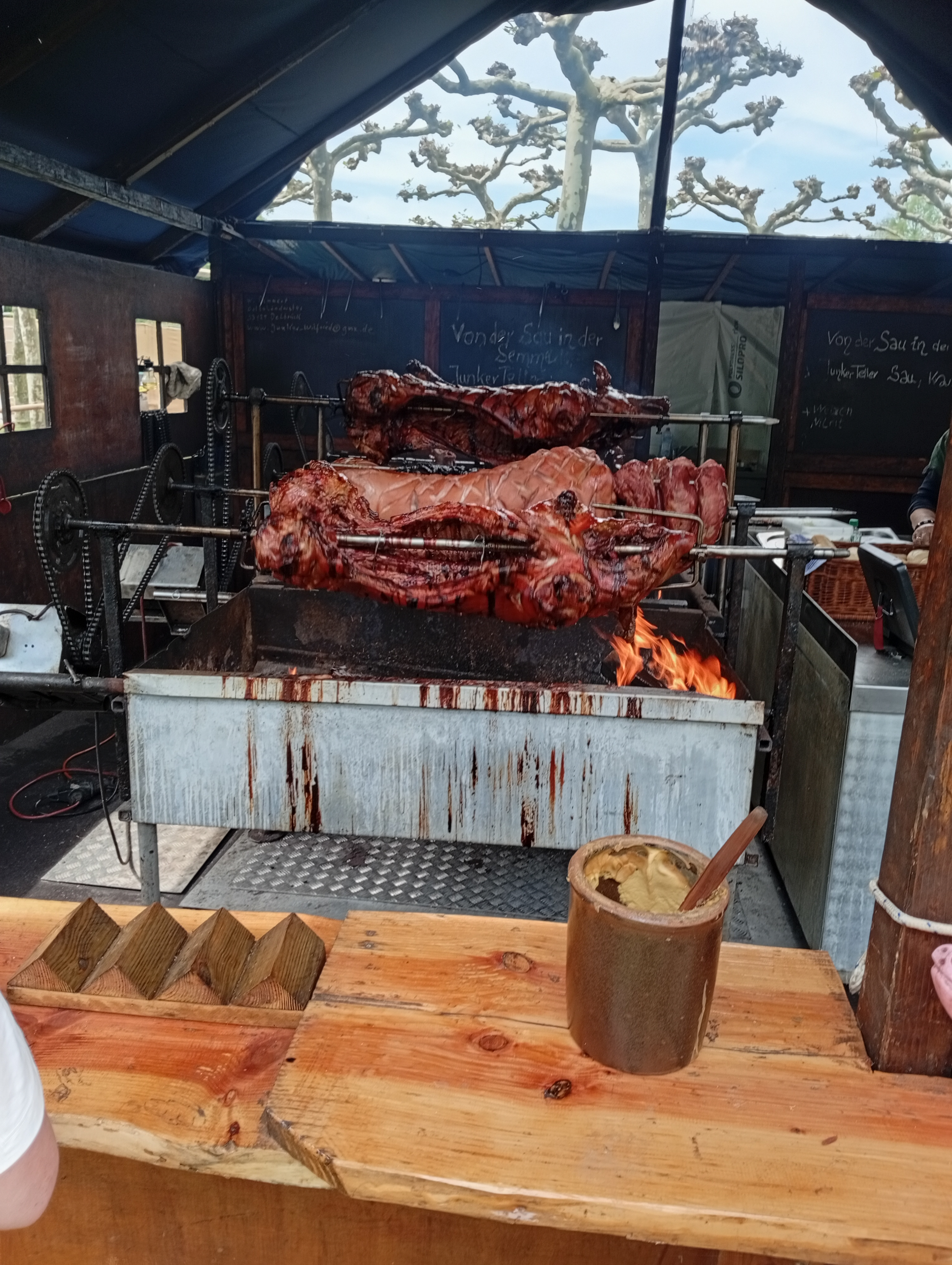
Medieval Pig roast

== Musicians ==
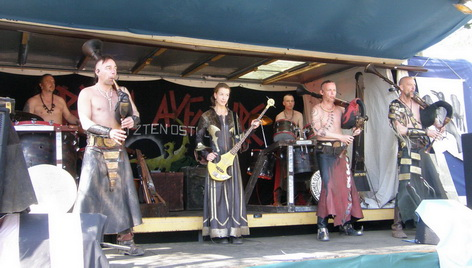
Cradem Aventure at Bentheim's Renaissance Fair in 2008

The list of performers includes Feuerdorn, Cultus Ferox, Furunkulus and Cradem Aventure.

== Weblinks ==
- Homepage Ritterfestspiele Bentheim
- Homepage Excalibur Horse Shows (Promoter)
- Homepage City of Bentheim
