= Full Metal Jousting =

2012 American game show TV series

- Genre: Reality
- Directed by: Adam Vetri
- Presented by: Shane Adams
- Country of origin: United States
- Original language: English
- No. of seasons: 1
- No. of episodes: 10

Production
- Executive producers: Craig Piligian; Ralph Wikke; Mitch Rosa
- Producers: Johnny Bell; Rita Doumar
- Production location: Jackson, Mississippi
- Camera setup: multiple-camera setup
- Running time: 44:22
- Production company: Pilgrim Films & Television

Original release
- Network: History Channel
- Release: February 12 – April 15, 2012

Full Metal Jousting is an American reality game show that debuted on the History Channel on February 12, 2012. The show featured 16 contestants, split into two teams of eight, competing in full-contact competitive jousting, a combat sport developed by host Shane Adams since the late 1990s. One by one, the contestants were eliminated tournament-style until only one remained. That contestant received a $100,000 grand prize.

== Gameplay ==
Each episode featured full-contact jousts in which competitors charged each other on horseback and collided at around 30 miles per hour. Unlike choreographed jousting familiar to many from dinner theater entertainment, the show featured authentic competitive jousting. The season-long competition was structured as a single-elimination tournament.

Two competitors were chosen to take part in each joust, selecting horses from an available stable and having separate practice sessions ahead of time. They wore full plate armor, with an extra plate bolted to one shoulder that served as a scoring target, and were armed with wooden lances. Points were scored by hitting the target with the lance tip, striking hard enough to break the lance, and unhorsing the opponent. A joust could be won on points after eight complete charges ("passes"), or by knockout at any time if a competitor was unhorsed and could not remount and be ready to continue within two minutes. If a competitor withdrew or was disqualified for any reason, a previously defeated opponent was reinstated in their place. Competitors who became injured during a practice session were allowed to return to their teams once they had been medically cleared, if they chose to do so.

== Show ==
Full Metal Jousting aired its first season (10 episodes) from February to April 2012. The first season was filmed over 38 days in October and November 2011 at Providence Hill Farm in Jackson, Mississippi.

A grand prize of $100,000 was awarded to the tournament winner. However, in Season 1, Episode 4 it was revealed that a $25,000 prize would be awarded as well. In the finale, each team chose one of its eliminated members to compete head-to-head for this additional prize.

=== Casting ===
Casting for the show began in the summer of 2011 with a casting deadline of July 20, 2011. Candidates were required to be at least 21 years of age, proficient in horseback riding, and a resident or citizen of the United States of America.

Around 600 people, including both men and women, applied. 30 applicants were accepted to a week-long boot camp led by the host, Shane Adams, at the end of which the producers and host eventually settled on the final 16 competitors, aged between 23 and 43. Out of those 16 competitors, five were theatrical jousters working at Medieval Times and another six were professional horsemen (trainers or sportsmen).

Full Metal Jousting is produced by Pilgrim Studios, which conducted a casting search via its website.

=== Contestants ===
Contestant	Occupation / background	Team (Note: In the first episode, the 2 coaches drafted their teams, with black picking 1st and alternating with red.)		Eliminated
Landon Morris; 27, Ft. Lauderdale, FL	Auctioneer	Black Team, drafted 9th		Disqualified (Note: Landon Morris was forced to leave the competition in episode five for breaching the show's "zero tolerance to animal cruelty" policy by punching a horse during practice and then denying what he did was wrong. Joe McKinley was reinstated to the competition in his place.)
Brian Tulk; 43, San Tan Valley, AZ	Firefighter and paramedic	Black Team, drafted 13th		Injured (Note: Brian Tulk injured his groin muscle in episode six and voluntarily left the competition.)
Mike Edwards (Note: Mike Edwards was initially on the Red Team but switched to the Black Team in episode six to replace Brian Tulk, who left due to injury.); 40, Las Vegas, NV	United States Marine Corps veteran, bartender, stuntman	Red; Team, drafted 2nd	Black; Team	1st & 7th Preliminary Jousts
Jack Mathis; 31, Dallas, TX	Theatrical jouster	Black Team, drafted 15th		2nd Preliminary Joust
Joseph McKinley; 29, Woodland Hills, CA	Professional horseman and horse trainer	Black Team, drafted 11th		3rd & 8th Preliminary Jousts
John Stikes; 28, Atlanta, GA	Theatrical jouster	Red Team, drafted 6th		4th Preliminary Joust
David Prewitt; 25, Klamath Falls, OR	United States Marine Corps veteran, MMA fighter	Red Team, drafted 12th		5th Preliminary Joust
Tom Conant; 25, Hilmar, CA	Professional horse trainer and polo player	Black Team, drafted 3rd		6th Preliminary Joust
Paul Suda; 26, Los Angeles, CA	Professional horse trainer	Red Team, drafted 14th		Quarterfinals
Rope Myers; 41, Van, TX	World champion steer wrestler, 2002 Olympic gold medalist	Black Team, drafted 1st		Quarterfinals $25,000 Winner
James Fairclough; 25, Newton, NJ	Professional show jumper	Red Team, drafted 4th		Quarterfinals
Nathan Klassen; 33, Broken Arrow, OK	Professional bull rider and horse trainer	Red Team, drafted 8th		Quarterfinals
Jake Nodar; 33, West Hollywood, CA	Professional horse trainer	Red Team, drafted 16th		Semifinals
Josh Avery; 23, Myrtle Beach, SC	Theatrical jouster	Red Team, drafted 10th		Semifinals
Matt Hiltman; 24, Atlanta, GA	Theatrical jouster	Black Team, drafted 5th		Finals
Joshua Knowles; 28, Myrtle Beach, SC	Theatrical jouster	Black Team, drafted 7th		$100,000 Winner

=== Episodes ===
No.	Title	Original release date
1	"The Ultimate Extreme Sport"	February 12, 2012
The 16 contestants are divided into two teams, and begin joust training. Red Team's Mike is chosen to go up against Black Team's Josh, losing 8-5.
2	"Unhorsed"	February 19, 2012
3	"Death Sticks & a Coffin"	February 26, 2012.
4	"Blood and Guts"	March 4, 2012
The $25,000 joust is announced, prompting teams to figure out which members will compete.
5	"Hits Like a Truck"	March 11, 2012
Landon is disqualified for animal cruelty, and Joe is reinstated to replace him.
6	"Ready to Rock"	March 18, 2012
After leaving due to injury, Black Team's Brian is replaced by Red Team's Mike.
7	"A Killing Machine"	March 25, 2012
8	"Go to War"	April 1, 2012
9	"Charge On"	April 8, 2012
10	"The Championship Joust"	April 15, 2012

=== Preliminary jousts ===
First Preliminary
Black	Knowles	8
Red	Edwards	5

Second Preliminary
Black	Mathis	1
Red	Nodar	11

Third Preliminary
Black	McKinley	19
Red	Avery	23

Fourth Preliminary
Black	Hiltman	21
Red	Stikes	-4

Fifth Preliminary
Black	Myers	20
Red	Prewitt	2

Sixth Preliminary
Black	Conant	7
Red	Suda	13

Seventh Preliminary
Black	Edwards (Note: Mike Edwards replaced Brian Tulk who left the competition due to injury. As Tulk was from the Black team, Edwards was required to switch from the Red to the Black team.)	3
Red	Klassen	17

Eighth Preliminary
Black	McKinley (Note: Joe McKinley replaced Landon Morris who was disqualified for mistreatment of his horse.)	12
Red	Fairclough	17

=== Tournament bracket ===
After the preliminary jousting completed, three players from the Black team and five players from the Red team advanced into the quarterfinals. The host and coaches decided the quarterfinal match-up, and the rest of the season continued as a single-elimination tournament.

Quarterfinals
Black	Myers	18
Red	Avery	19
Black	Knowles	25
Red	Suda	14
Red	Fairclough	7
Red	Nodar	11
Black	Hiltman	3
Red	Klassen	2

Semifinals
Red	Avery	22
Black	Knowles	23
Red	Nodar	1
Black	Hiltman	22

Finals
Black	Knowles	17
Black	Hiltman	16

^1 Since both players were from the Black team, for visual clarity during this match Knowles' score was designated as Gold.
^2 Since both players were from the Red team, for visual clarity during this match Nodar's score was designated as Silver.

=== $25,000 joust ===
In Season 1, Episode 4 it was revealed there would also be a $25,000 prize awarded. Each team was asked to nominate one member of their team, not already in the finals, who would compete prior to the final joust.

The Black team decided on two players they felt deserved to be in the $25,000 joust, Rope Meyers and Jack Mathis. For their final decision they had a coin toss. The coach for the Black Team, Rod Walker, was asked to flip a coin, and prior to the coin toss Jack Mathis was asked to call it; he chose "tails". The toss was "heads", and Rope Meyers was in the $25,000 joust for the Black Team.

The Red team decided to hold a secret ballot. There were two votes for David Prewitt, two votes for Josh Avery, and three votes for John Stikes who would now face Rope Meyes in the $25,000 joust for the Red Team.

Rope Meyers won the $25,000 joust with a score of 6 to 2.

$25,000 Joust
Black	Meyers	6
Red	Stikes	2

== Reception ==
The show premiered on February 12, 2012 to a total of 1.9 million viewers. The numbers after the premiere were stable, ranging from 1.2 million viewers to 1.7 million viewers. The finale was reported to have drawn 1.44M viewers for a .5 share.
