= Warwick International School of Riding =

Coordinates: 52.30096°N 1.57452°W

The Warwick International School of Riding is a school of equitation (horsemanship), located just north of Warwick, Warwickshire, England. The school caters to an international clientele of riders in the disciplines of show jumping, cross-country, hacking and general riding. It accommodates both disabled and able-bodied riders and has facilities for people to stay during riding vacations. Founded in the early 1970s by Janet Martinez, the Warwick School of Riding started off with just three horses. as of 2010, the school has over 40 horses and acres of land to ride and jump. The school appeared on Keeping Up Appearances (in the episode "Please Mind Your Head"), where Hyacinth decides to visit the country and ends up on a runaway horse.

The school has also run a jousting course, for Middle Ages recreations groups.
