= Theatrical jousting =

Reenaction of the medieval sport

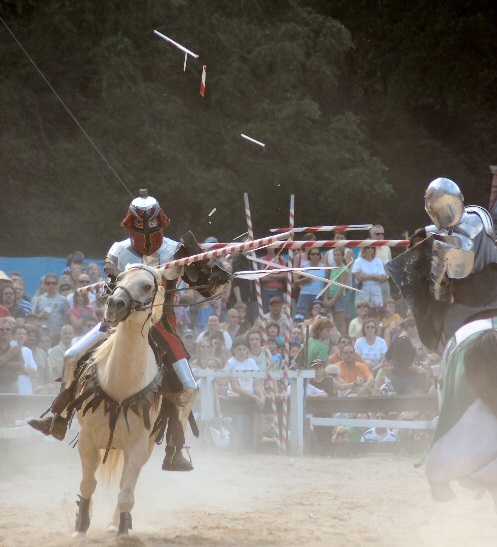
Jousting performance at the Bristol Renaissance Faire (2006)

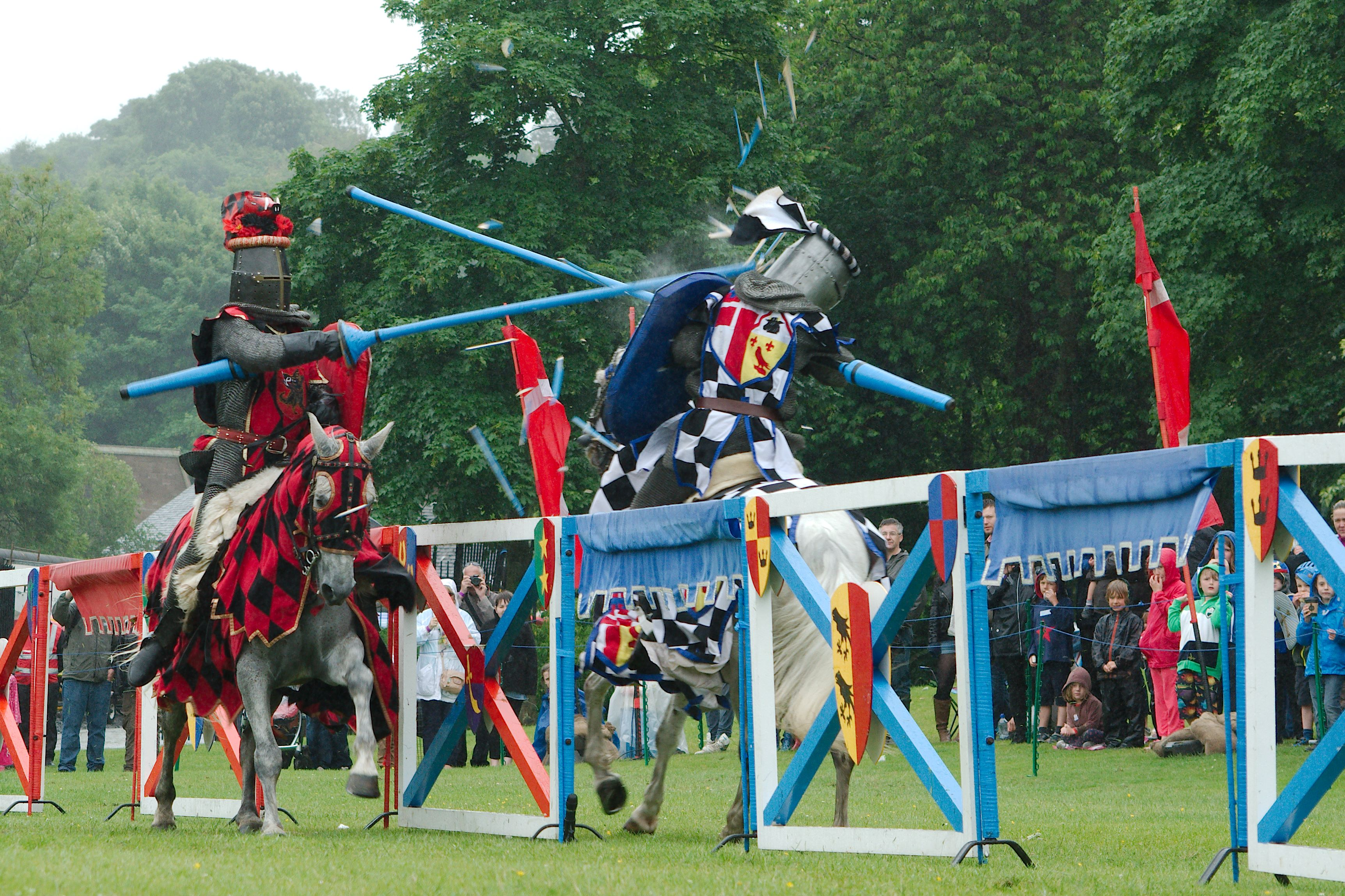
Jousting performance at the Linlithgow Palace (2013)

Theatrical jousting is a form of live entertainment in which a medieval jousting tournament is recreated in conjunction with a scripted performance. Alternative terms are jousting reenactment and choreographed jousting.

Ritterfestspiele Bad Bentheim 2026

A mock joust was held as part of the Nottingham festival in 1970.

The Hanlon-Lees Action Theater is credited with developing the theatrical joust format in 1979; its first appearance was at the New York Renaissance Faire in Tuxedo, New York. This type of performance had become very popular at various renaissance fairs by the early 2000s.

Typically a three-act affair, the theatrical joust consists of

1. a display of skill;
2. a mock battle which results in a verbal challenge;
3. an armed joust on horseback, often "to the death."

A variety of colorful characters, either villainous or heroic, give the audience (which is usually divided into sectors based upon the number of "knights") a particular person to root for or against.

As the show must be repeated on a daily or weekly basis, all fights are carefully choreographed and rehearsed. Horses must be trained to withstand such peculiarities as the clatter of steel weaponry, the occurrence of a rider being knocked from the saddle, and the roar of large crowds. Special makeup and prop effects are often incorporated into the performance to provide the illusion of violent death or shattering equipment.
