= Lohnsfeld =

- Municipality
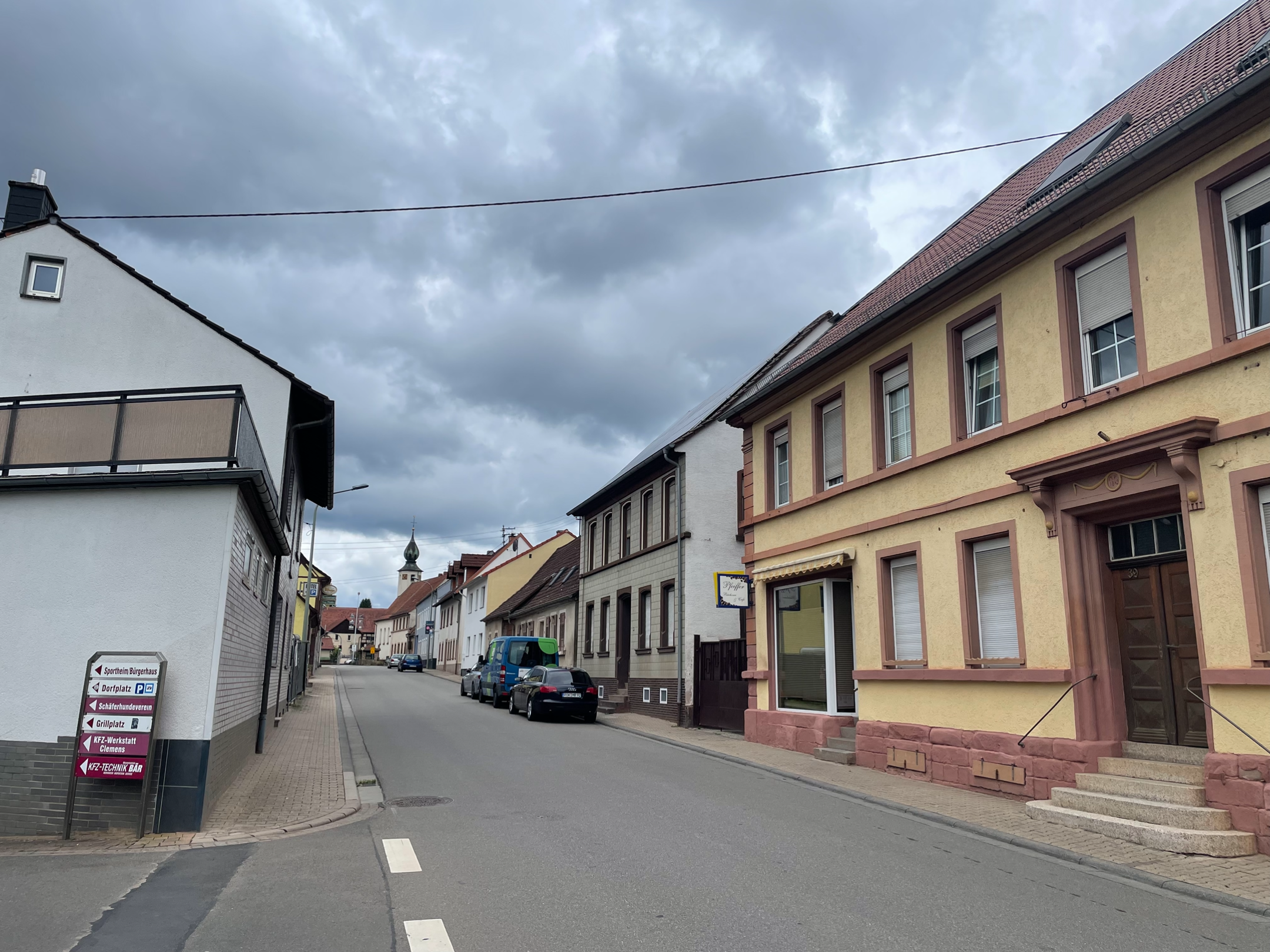
- Kaiserstraße, former federal road B40, in the village center

- Coat of arms

- Location of Lohnsfeld within Donnersbergkreis district
- Interactive map of Lohnsfeld
- Location within Germany Location within Rhineland-Palatinate
- Coordinates: 49°33′2″N 7°51′12″E
- Country: Germany
- State: Rhineland-Palatinate
- District: Donnersbergkreis
- Municipal assoc.: Winnweiler

Government
  - Mayor (2024–29): Daniel Korn

Area
  - Total: 6.90 km^{2} (2.66 sq mi)
- Elevation: 252 m (827 ft)

Population (2025-12-31)
  - Total: 939
  - Density: 136/km^{2} (352/sq mi)
- Time zone: UTC+01:00 (CET)
  - Summer (DST): UTC+02:00 (CEST)
- Postal codes: 67727
- Dialling codes: 06302
- Vehicle registration: KIB
- Website: www.lohnsfeld.de

Lohnsfeld is a municipality in the Donnersbergkreis district, in Rhineland-Palatinate, Germany.

== Geography ==
Lohnsfeld is located in the North Palatine Uplands, south of the Donnersberg. The nearest city is Kaiserslautern 18 km (11 mi) south of the village.

Besides the village proper, the municipality consists of the hamlet of Schmitterhof and the inhabited places of Krupp’sche Ziegelhütte and Pulvermühle.

Neighbouring municipalities are Winnweiler, Münchweiler, Wartenberg-Rohrbach and Otterberg.

== History ==
In 1190 "Sacerdos Cunradus de Loginsfeld" is mentioned in a document. The village name changes to "Lohnsfeit" (1327), "Lanßfeldt" (1486) and finally "Lohnsfeld" in the 17th/18th century.

The village was part of the end of the 18th century County of Falkenstein.

After the War of the First Coalition Lohnsfeld was occupied and later annexed by France with the Treaty of Campo Formio in 1797. From 1798 to 1814 it belonged to the French Departement du Mont-Tonnerre. After the Congress of Vienna the region was first given to Austria (1815) and later to Bavaria (1816).

After World War II Lohnsfeld became part of Rhineland-Palatinate (1946). Since 1969 it belongs to the Donnersbergkreis district.

== Politics ==
=== Council ===
The village council is composed of 12 members who were elected in a personalized proportional representation in the local elections on June 9, 2024, and the honorary mayor as chairman.

=== Mayor ===
Daniel Korn was elected mayor of Lohnsfeld on 2 July 2024.

=== Heraldry ===
The coat of arms shows an oak branch and a scallop.

Oak branches can be found on many coats of arms in the former territories of the County of Falkenstein. It appears on the seal of the court of Lohnsfeld and Potzbach in the 16th century. The scallop is the symbol of Saint Jacob, patron saint of the local church. It was adopted in 1983.

== Infrastructure ==
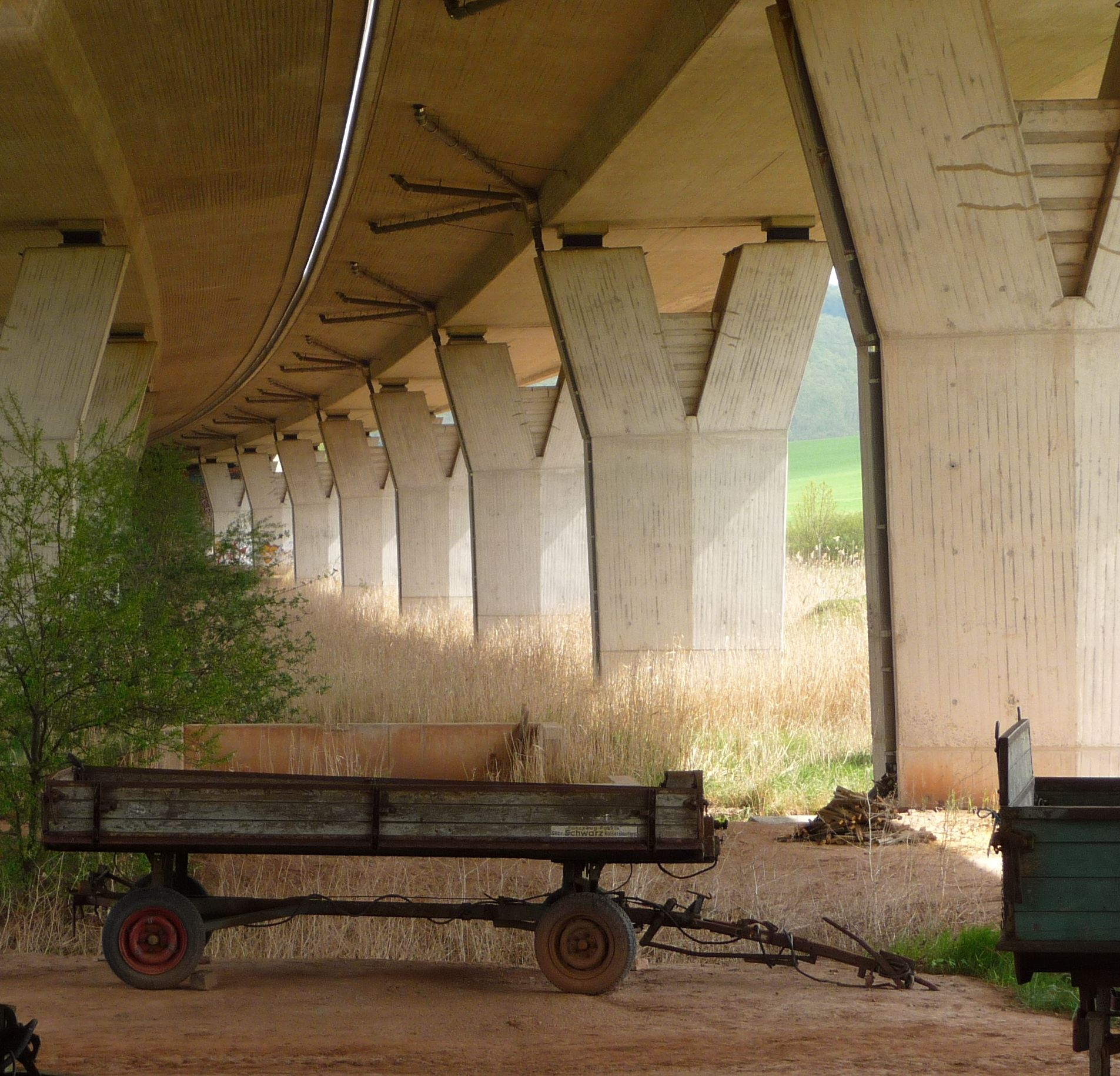
highway bridge south of Lohnsfeld

The old Kaiserstraße ("imperial road") from Paris to Mainz, which was built under Napoleon runs through the village center. It later became federal road 40, but was downgraded to a state road on 15 October 2004, when A63 highway was opened.

In Winnweiler is a station along the Alsenz Valley Railway.

== People ==
- Johann Jakob Atzel (1754-1816), architect
