= Falkenstein, Rhineland-Palatinate =

Falkenstein
- Municipality
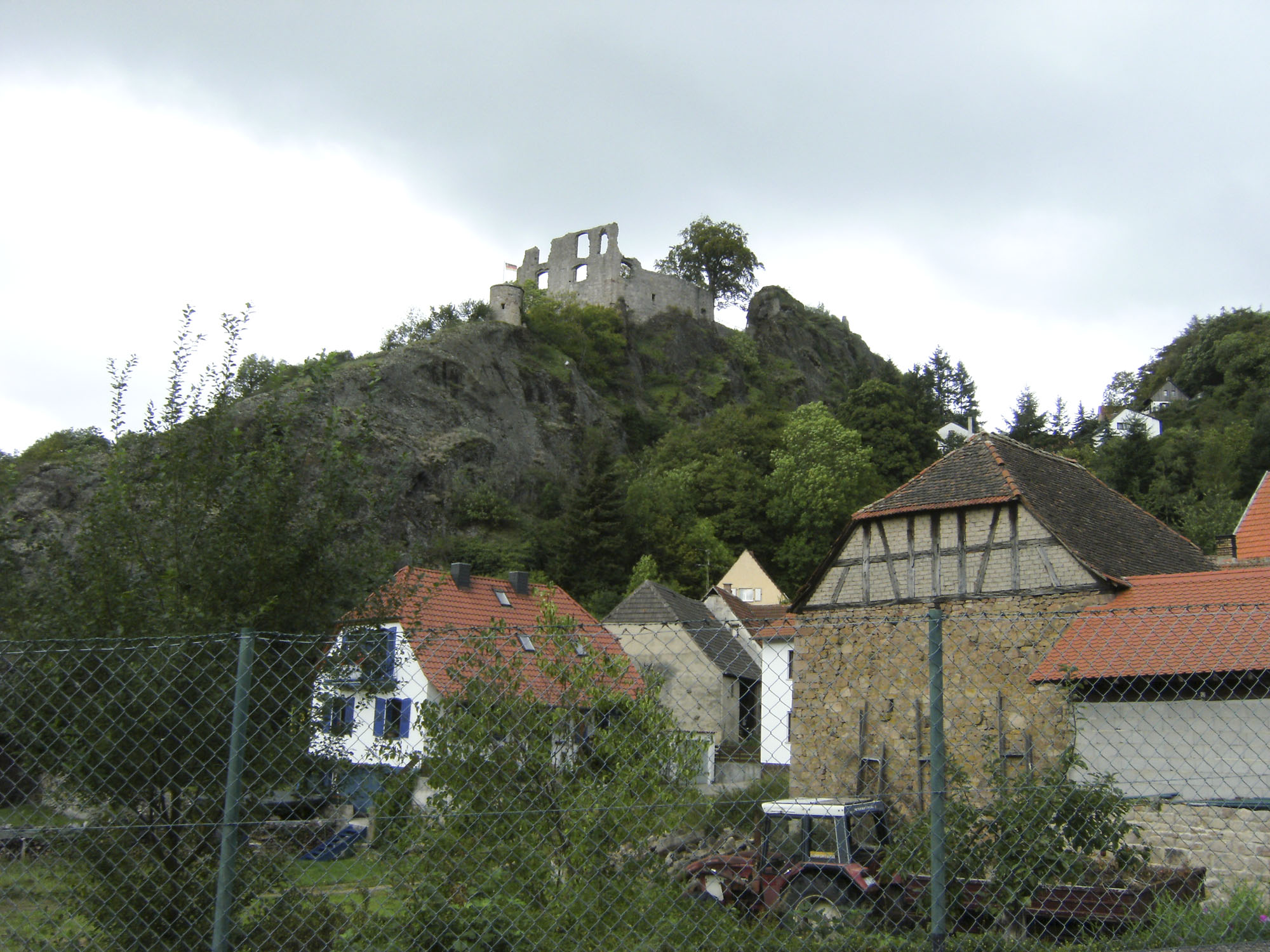
- Falkenstein Castle above the village

- Coat of arms

- Location of Falkenstein within Donnersbergkreis district
- Interactive map of Falkenstein
- Location within Germany Location within Rhineland-Palatinate
- Coordinates: 49°36′27″N 7°52′26″E
- Country: Germany
- State: Rhineland-Palatinate
- District: Donnersbergkreis
- Municipal assoc.: Winnweiler

Government
  - Mayor (2019–24): Volker Demmerle

Area
  - Total: 7.48 km^{2} (2.89 sq mi)
- Elevation: 404 m (1,325 ft)

Population (2025-12-31)
  - Total: 178
  - Density: 23.8/km^{2} (61.6/sq mi)
- Time zone: UTC+01:00 (CET)
  - Summer (DST): UTC+02:00 (CEST)
- Postal codes: 67808
- Dialling codes: 06302
- Vehicle registration: KIB
- Website: www.falkenstein-pfalz.de

Falkenstein (German pronunciation: [ˈfalkn̩ˌʃtaɪn]) is a municipality in the Donnersbergkreis district, in Rhineland-Palatinate, Germany. The castle was the seat of the Counts of Falkenstein.

== Geography ==
Falkenstein is located in the North Palatine Uplands west of the Donnersberg mountain.

The linear settlement is located along an old pass road that reaches its highest elevation at 464 m (1522 ft). The village's main street is one of the steepest public roads in Germany with a 25% gradient. Along the road to Winnweiler the Falkensteiner Tal (Falkenstein Valley), known for its rock formations is situated. Most of the district is forested.

Besides the village proper a holiday colony and the outlying settlements Bornshof, Fuchshof, Merzauerhof and Wambacherhof belong to the municipality.

Neighbouring municipalities are Rockenhausen (borough of Marienthal), Imsbach, Winnweiler and Schweisweiler. The next bigger city is Kaiserslautern 25 km (15 mi) south of Falkenstein.

== History ==
In 1255, the Counts of Falkenstein inherited territories of extinct Hagen-Munzenberg. In 1418, the line died out, the territory was passed to Lords of Eppstein and Counts of Solms. Later the Solms portion passed to Isenburg-Budingen by female inheritance. In 1647, there was a siege, shelling and storming of the castle by the French. In 1654 Falkensteiners stormed the building and shot the Lorraine commander Weingart. The last Count of Falkenstein, William Wirich, sold 1667, the impoverished county to the Duke of Lorraine. In 1736 the Imperial House of Habsburg possessed the county through the marriage of Francis Stephen of Lorraine with Maria Theresia. In 1816 Falkenstein was transferred along with the rest of Palatinate to the Kingdom of Bavaria as a result of decisions taken at the Congress of Vienna agreements.

== Politics ==
=== Council ===
The village council is composed of 6 members who were elected in a personalized proportional representation in the local elections on June 9, 2024, and the honorary mayor as chairman.

=== Heraldry ===
The coat of arms shows an oak branch at the top. The lower half is occupied by a castle and a falcon.

== Culture and sights ==
=== Protected buildings ===
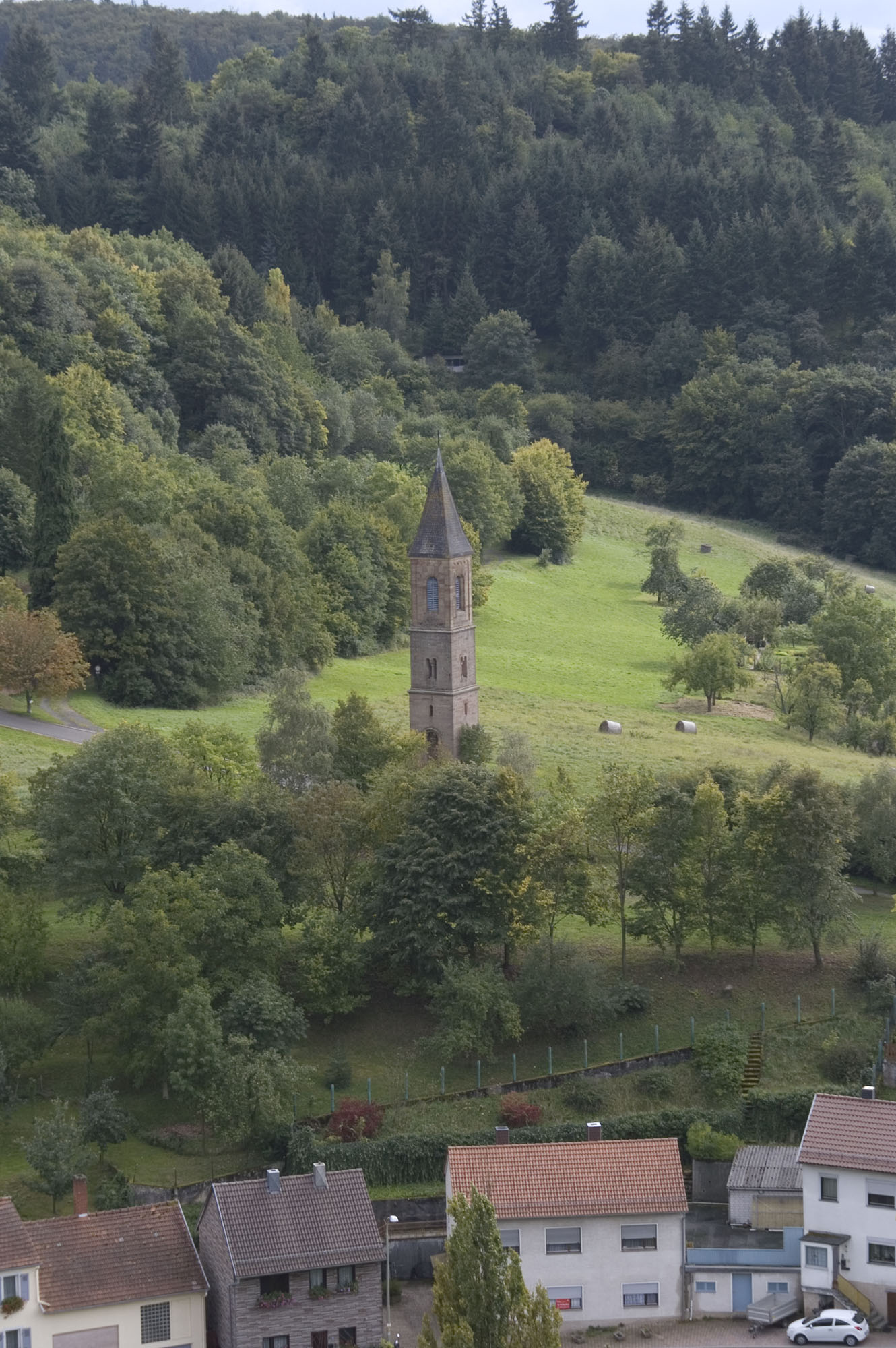
protected protestant bell tower

Falkenstein Castle and the Jewish cemetery are protected ensembles.

The castle is located above the village and was partly restored in 1979. There are an open-air stage as well as a restaurant. The grounds were once owned by the Gienanth family and later the Rockenhausen and Donnersbergkreis districts. Since 1996 it belongs to the municipality. Renovations were made in 1978 and 1984 and the castle was added to the list of protected buildings.

There are four other protected buildings in the municipality.

=== Other buildings ===
Saint Catherine's catholic church was built in 1976 and replaced an older chapel from 1764. There is a Kneipp facility near the cemetery, opened in 1997.

=== Nature ===
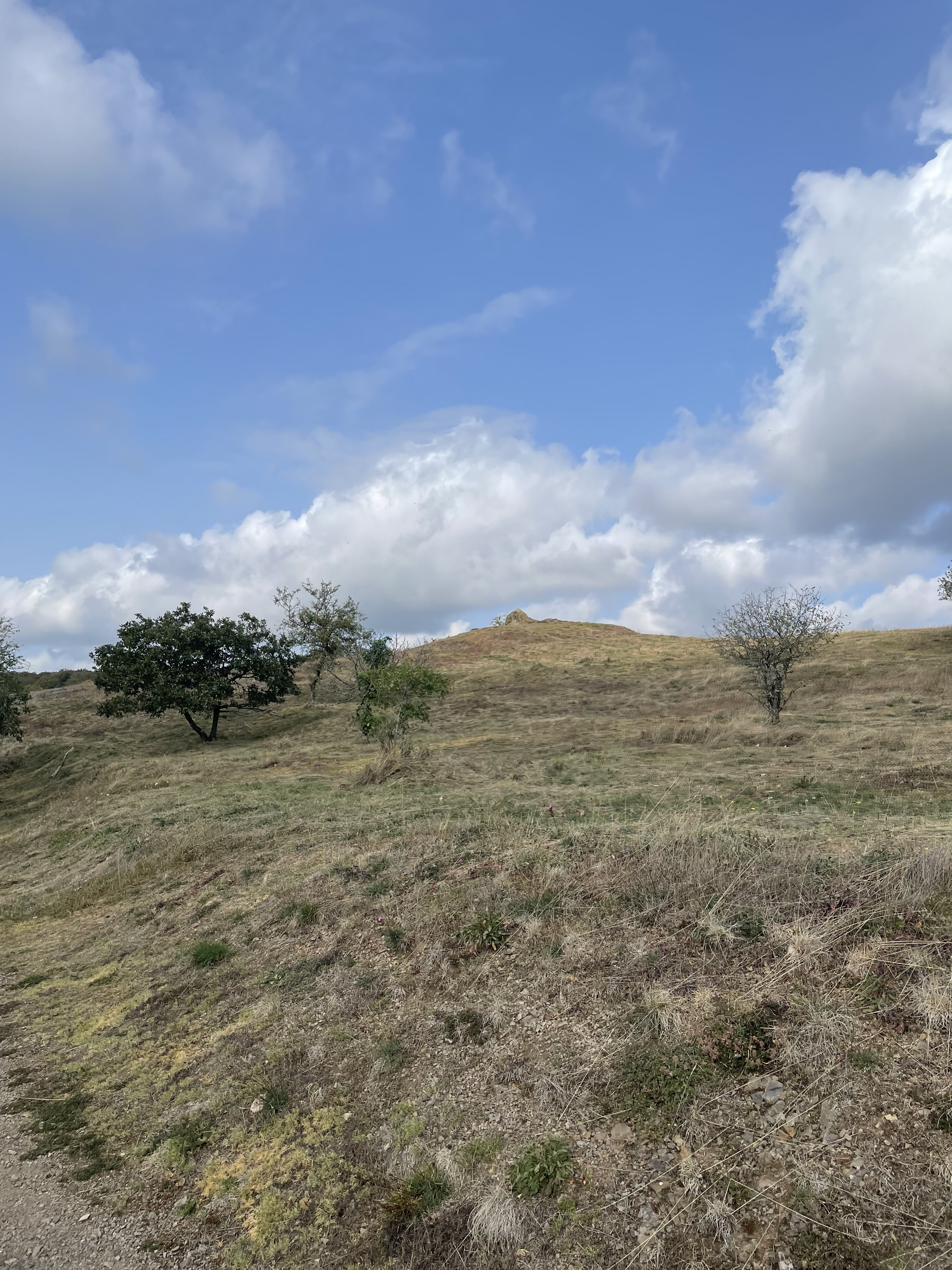
Schelmenkopf-Falkenstein

The Falkenstein Valley was a protected natural monument. The Schelmenkopf-Falkenstein nature reserve is located west of the village.

== Economy and infrastructure ==
=== Traffic ===
Falkenstein is connected by a minor road to Marienthal and Imsbach. B48 federal road, through which A63 highway is reachable, runs west of the village.

137 and 905 bus lines of the VRN serve a bus stop at the lower end of the village. Winnweiler has a station along the Alsenz Valley Railway.

=== Tourism ===
Several hiking trails run through and around Falkenstein. The Palatine Ridgeway touches the south of its district.

== Personalities ==
=== Honorary citizen ===
- Josef Fischer (born 1940), baker, mayor from 1989 to 2004, acknowledged for his service and commitment in 2008

=== Born in Falkenstein ===
- Luitgard of Falkenstein (~1357-1391), noblewoman

=== Connected to Falkenstein ===
- Kuno II von Falkenstein (~1320-1388), archbishop and elector of Trier
- Emich Christian of Leiningen-Dagsburg (1642-1702), count of Leiningen-Dagsburg, married here in 1664
