= Münzenberg Castle =

Coordinates: 50°27′06″N 8°46′33″E

- Burg Münzenberg
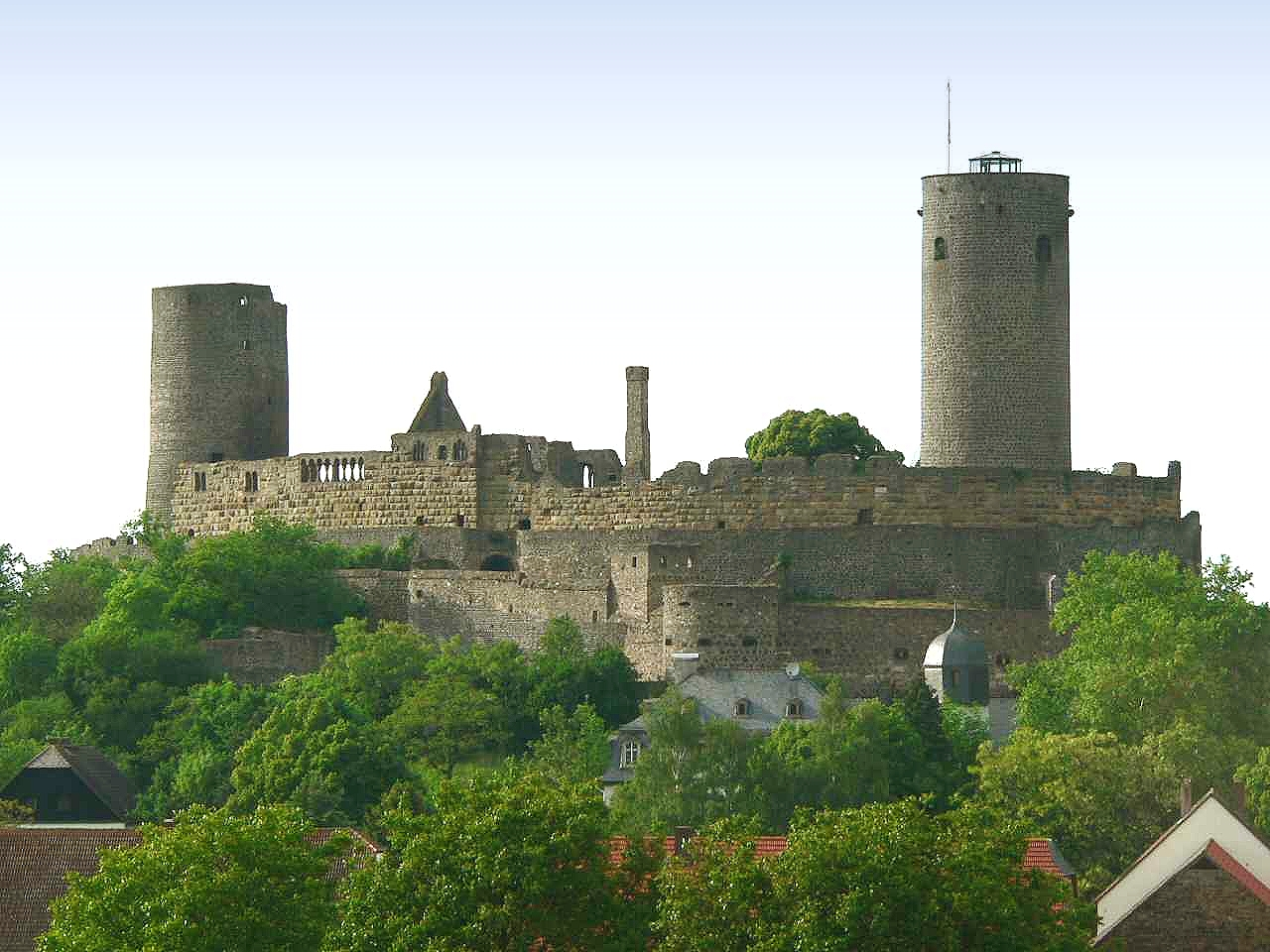
- Münzenberg Castle from the south

- Location within Hesse Location within Germany

General information
- Type: Hill castle
- Location: Münzenberg, Hesse, Germany
- Groundbreaking: 12th century

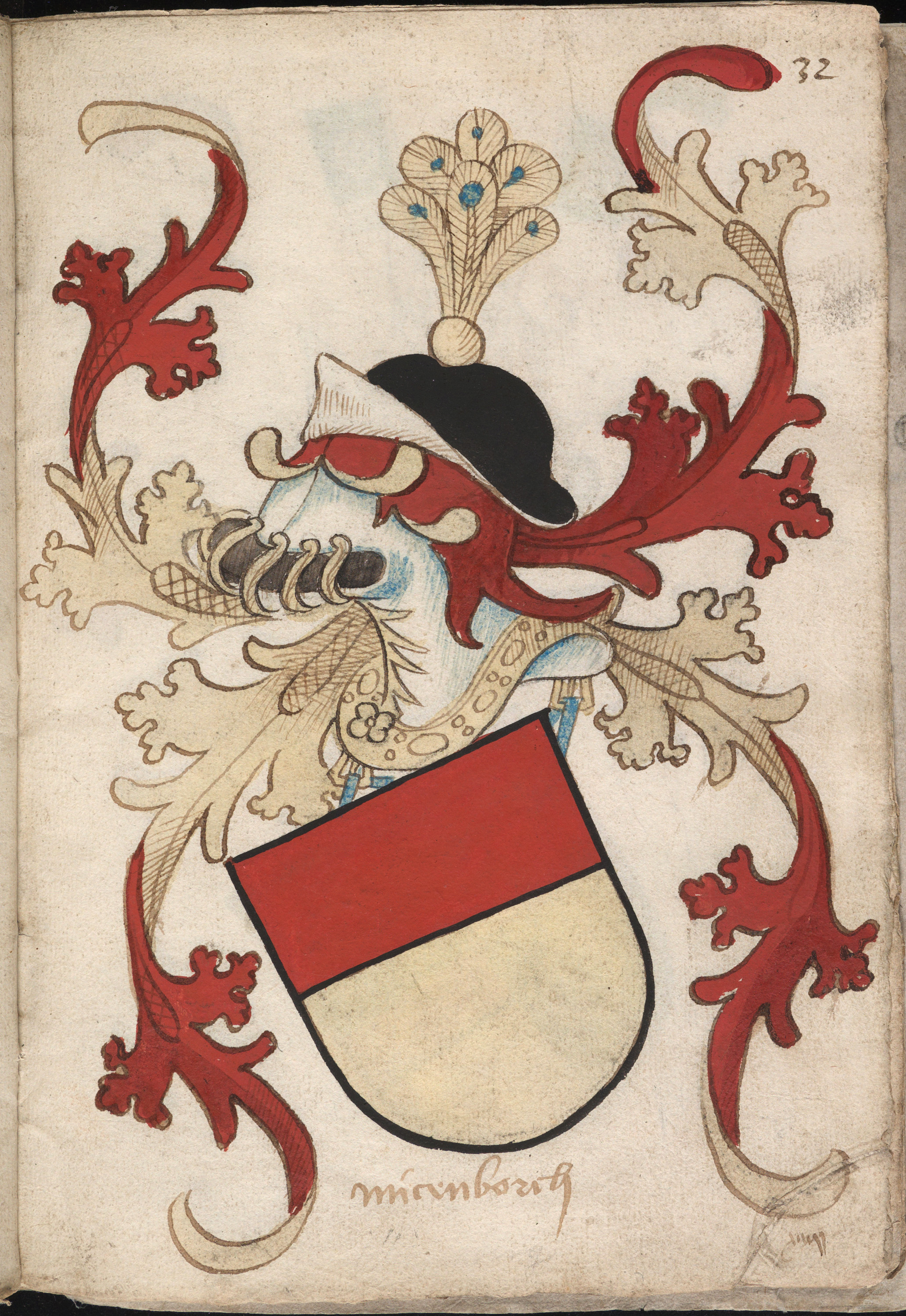
Coat of arms of Münzenberg (ca. 1490)

Münzenberg Castle (German. Burg Münzenberg) is a ruined hill castle in the town of the same name in the Wetteraukreis, Hesse, Germany. It dates from the 12th century. It is one of the best preserved castles from the High Middle Ages in Germany.

== History ==
The first lord of nearby Arnsburg known by name is Kuno von Arnsburg, who served Emperor Heinrich IV as a Ministerialis in 1057. Around 1064 he married Gräfin Mathilde of the House of Bilstein. Their daughter, Gertrud (b. c. 1065, d. before 1093) married Eberhard von Hagen (1075-1122), lord of Burg Hayn near Frankfurt, who moved his seat to Arnsburg and changed his name to "von Hagen und Arnsburg". Under Eberhard's son, Konrad I (1093-1130) the family became the most powerful in the Wetterau and the Rhine-Main region. Konrad II exchanged properties with Fulda Abbey, receiving the land around Münzenberg Castle. The name Münzenberg means Mint mountain, after the mint growing on the hill.

His son, Kuno I (1151-1207), from 1156 styled himself von Münzenberg, implying that by then a castle had been built at Münzenberg and the earlier one at Arnsburg had been vacated. He was the chamberlain of Emperor Frederick II who wished to preserve the Wetterau region as imperial Crown land, and thus agreed that his faithful built a prominent castle dominating the country far and wide.

The exact time of the construction is controversial in research. It is generally assumed that during the time of Kuno I, significant parts of the ring wall around the main castle, the Romanesque palace, the eastern keep, the gate building with the chapel above it and parts of the kitchen building were built. This construction phase is said to have ended in 1174 at the latest without the circular wall being completed. The palace remained unplastered, the kitchen building a torso.

With the death of Ulrich II of Münzenberg in 1255 the male line of the imperial ministerialis of Münzenberg died out. His inheritance was divided among six of his sisters, with Ysegarde of Münzenberg bringing the castle and associated lands into her marriage to another imperial ministerialis, Philipp IV., Lord of Falkenstein, the treasure keeper of the Imperial Regalia. Around 1260, brisk building activity began under him. The northern palace, later named after him, was built, the kitchen was completed, the ring wall was closed, the existing parts were raised and finally a second keep was built in the western part of the core castle.

In 1296 the Falkenstein family finally left Münzenberg Castle and moved to Lich. Philipp VII of Falkenstein-Münzenberg was created a count in 1397. In 1418 the family died out with the Archbishop of Trier, Werner von Falkenstein. His three younger brothers having died without male issue, the two remaining sisters partitioned the inheritance. The House of Solms, originally from Solms, inherited Münzenberg Castle as well as its lands and those of Lich. After 125 years of vacancy, the castle was expanded again around 1424, with Bernhard of Solms-Braunfels building a gate tower, the Zwinger complex with outer bailey and the outer ring wall with a front gate. His brother Johann (1411–1457) founded the branch of Solms-Lich which shortly afterwards took over Münzenberg castle. In 1514 the Romanesque part was altered in late Gothic style and a large western and four smaller battery towers inserted into the outer curtain wall. The Thirty Years' War left the castle in ruins.

In 1846 work began on restoring individual parts of the castle and securing the masonry. Just one year later, the eastern keep could be climbed. However, plans for a romantic restoration of the castle were dropped by the counts of Solms-Laubach, by then owners of the castle. In 1935 they sold it to the People's State of Hesse. Today, the State Palaces and Gardens of Hesse maintain the castle ruins.

== Description ==
A striking feature of Münzenberg Castle is that it has two tall defensive towers, a structure known as a bergfried (Thompson 2008). Such a tower is a typical feature of castles in the region, but there is usually only one, forming the strongest point of the castle. The bergfrieds at Münzenberg are both round, the taller one being 29 meters high.

The two bergfrieds stand at opposite ends of the inner ward (here called the Kernburg). The inner ward is completely surrounded by an outer ward with an outer curtain wall, providing defense in depth.

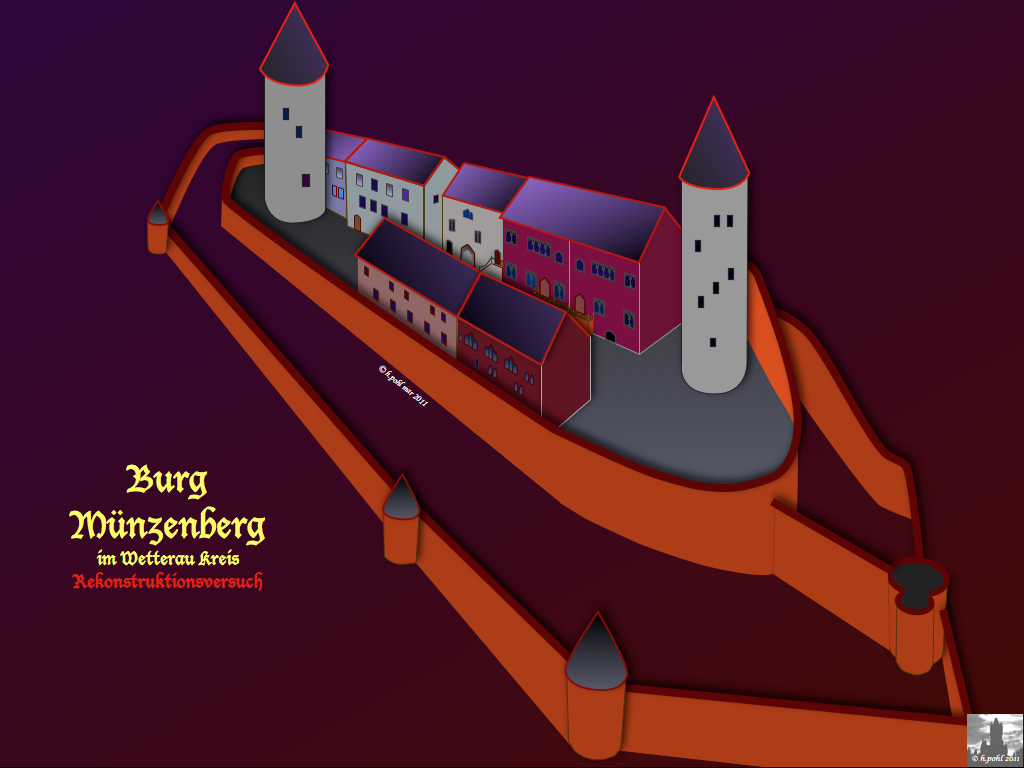
Reconstruction draft

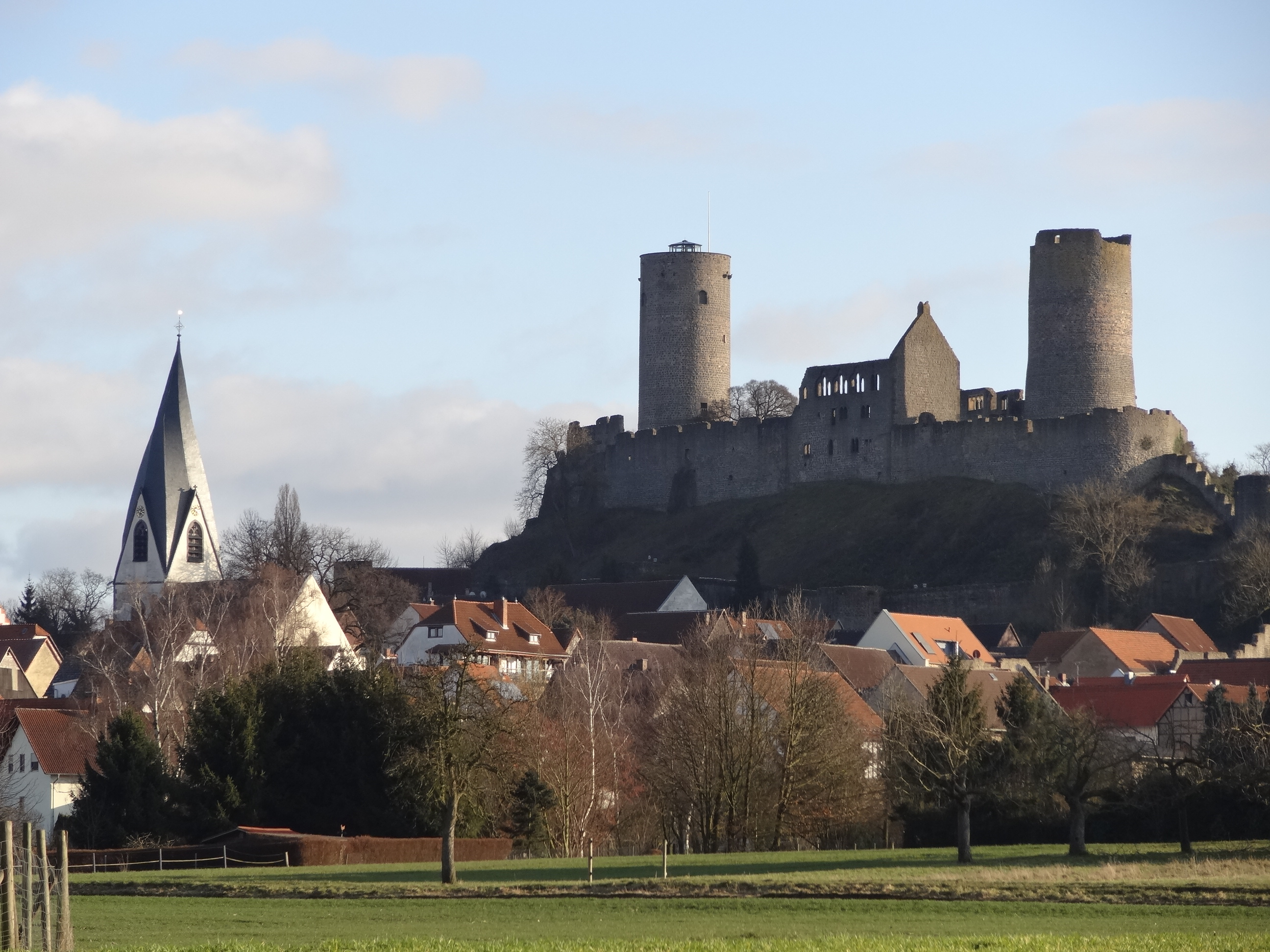
Castle view

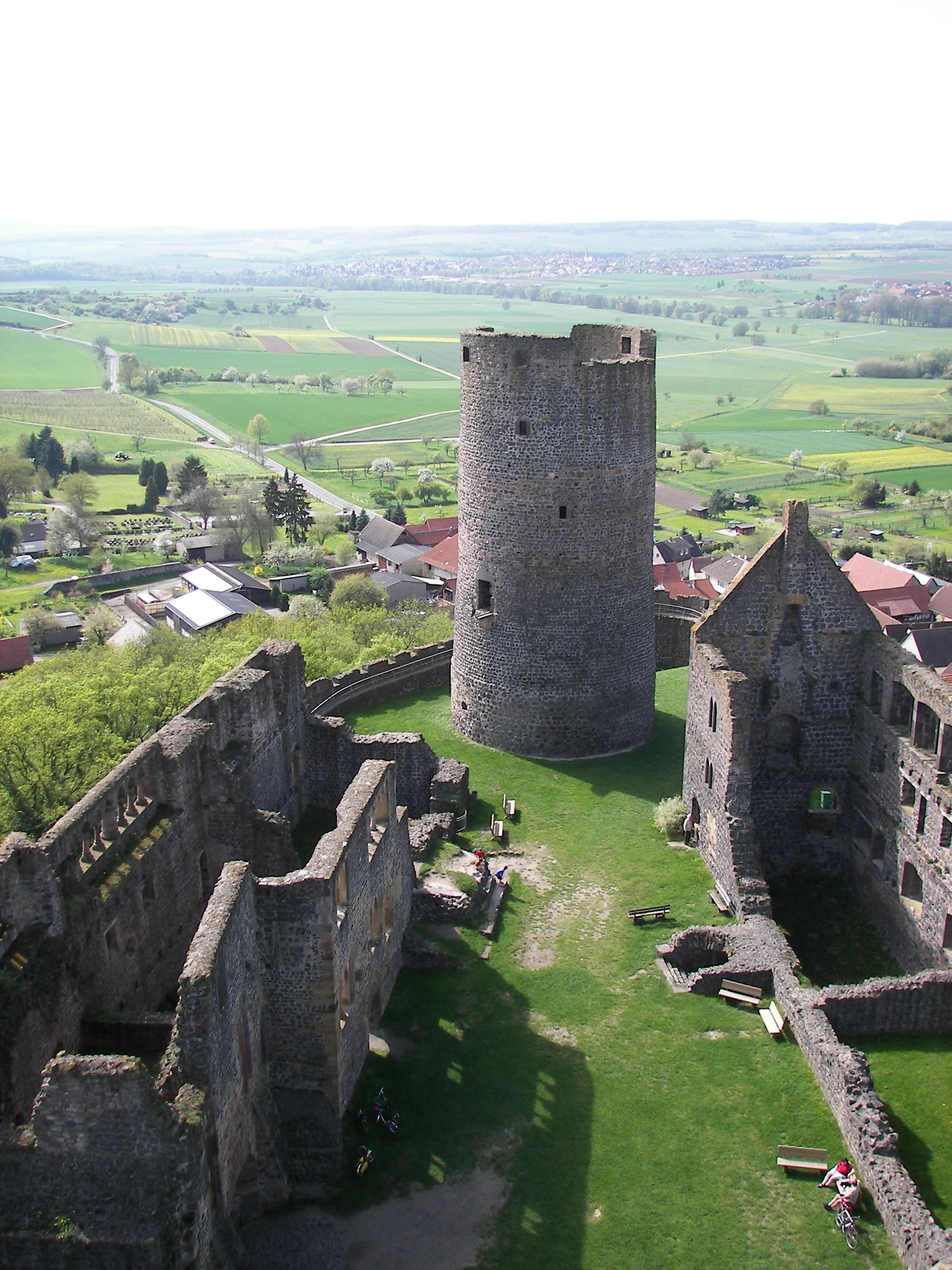
View from the Eastern bergfried

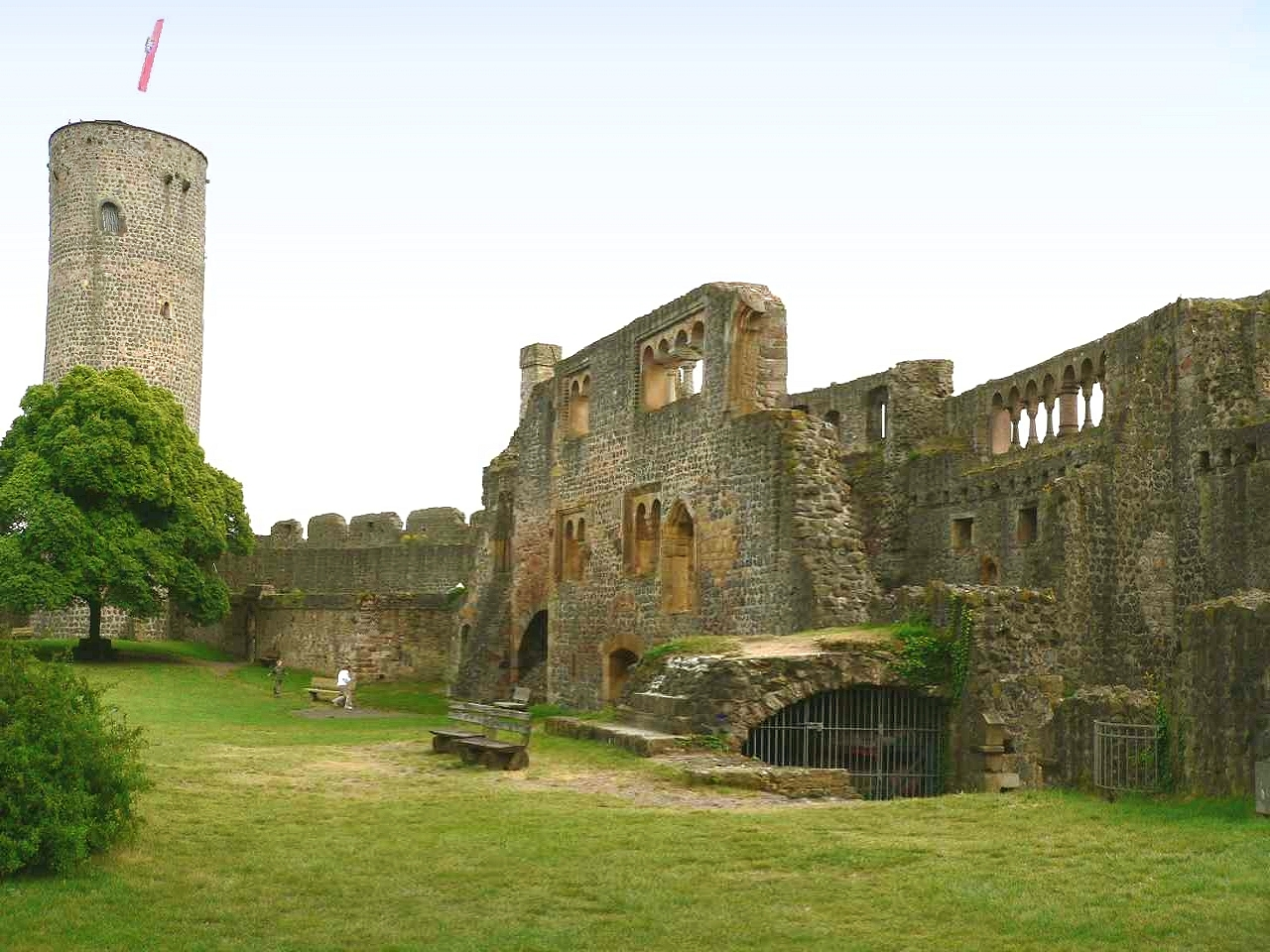
Western bergfried and palas (residential building)

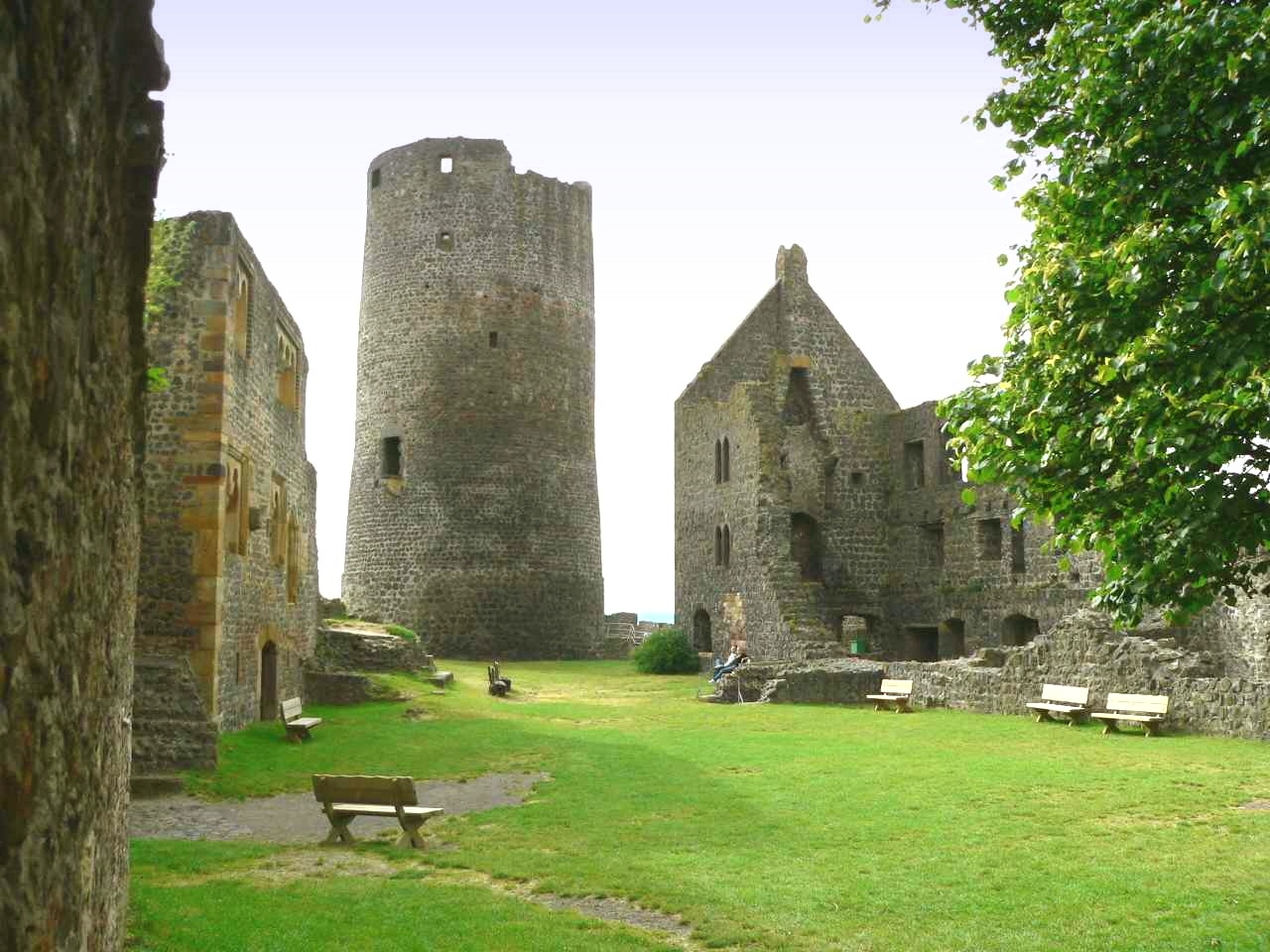
Eastern bergfried seen from the inner ward

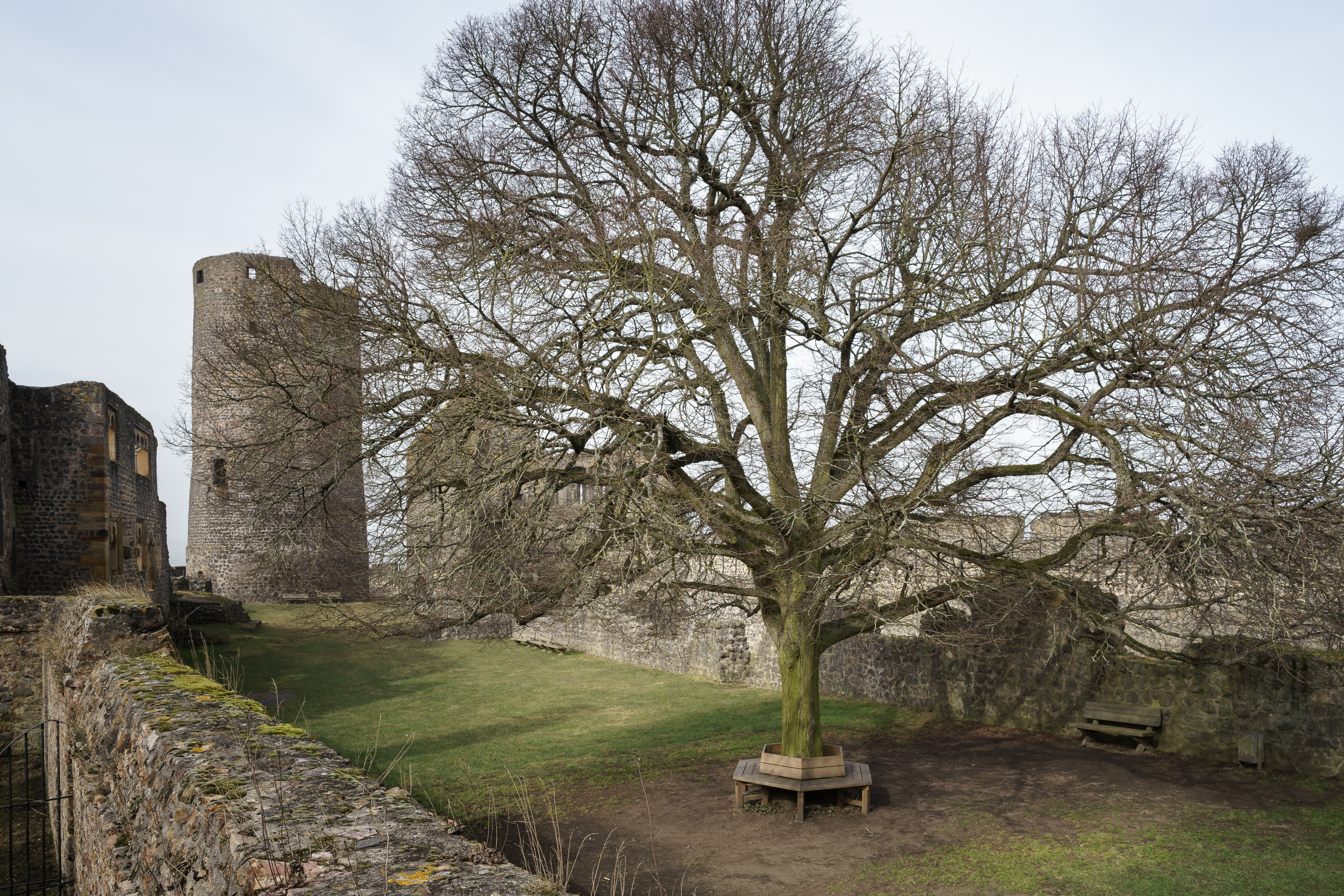
Old Tilia
