= Breunigweiler =

- Municipality
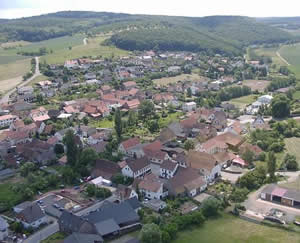

- Coat of arms

- Location of Breunigweiler within Donnersbergkreis district
- Interactive map of Breunigweiler
- Location within Germany Location within Rhineland-Palatinate
- Coordinates: 49°32′52″N 7°54′23″E
- Country: Germany
- State: Rhineland-Palatinate
- District: Donnersbergkreis
- Municipal assoc.: Winnweiler

Government
  - Mayor (2019–24): Marcel Form

Area
  - Total: 3.24 km^{2} (1.25 sq mi)
- Elevation: 247 m (810 ft)

Population (2025-12-31)
  - Total: 449
  - Density: 139/km^{2} (359/sq mi)
- Time zone: UTC+01:00 (CET)
  - Summer (DST): UTC+02:00 (CEST)
- Postal codes: 67725
- Dialling codes: 06357
- Vehicle registration: KIB
- Website: www.breunigweiler.de

Breunigweiler is a municipality in the Donnersbergkreis district, in Rhineland-Palatinate, Germany.
