= Gonbach =

- Municipality
- Coat of arms

- Location of Gonbach within Donnersbergkreis district
- Interactive map of Gonbach
- Location within Germany Location within Rhineland-Palatinate
- Coordinates: 49°32′52″N 7°54′23″E
- Country: Germany
- State: Rhineland-Palatinate
- District: Donnersbergkreis
- Municipal assoc.: Winnweiler

Government
  - Mayor (2019–24): Jürgen Berberich

Area
  - Total: 2.92 km^{2} (1.13 sq mi)
- Elevation: 290 m (950 ft)

Population (2025-12-31)
  - Total: 494
  - Density: 169/km^{2} (438/sq mi)
- Time zone: UTC+01:00 (CET)
  - Summer (DST): UTC+02:00 (CEST)
- Postal codes: 67724
- Dialling codes: 06302
- Vehicle registration: KIB
- Website: www.gonbach.de

Gonbach is a municipality in the Donnersbergkreis district, in Rhineland-Palatinate, Germany.
