= Börrstadt =

- Municipality
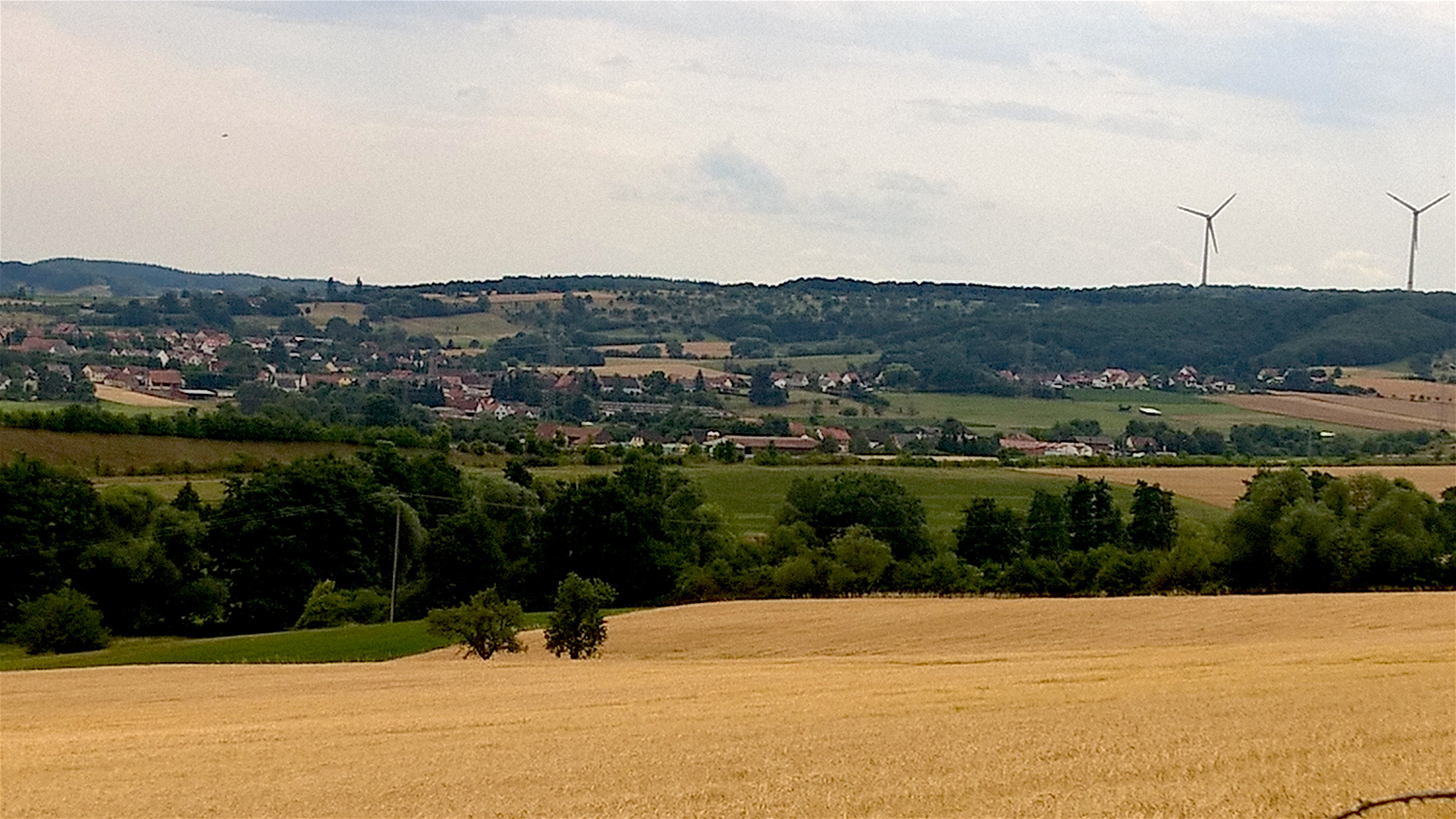

- Coat of arms

- Location of Börrstadt within Donnersbergkreis district
- Interactive map of Börrstadt
- Location within Germany Location within Rhineland-Palatinate
- Coordinates: 49°34′39.78″N 7°56′35.4″E
- Country: Germany
- State: Rhineland-Palatinate
- District: Donnersbergkreis
- Municipal assoc.: Winnweiler

Government
  - Mayor (2019–24): Torsten Windecker

Area
  - Total: 15.09 km^{2} (5.83 sq mi)
- Elevation: 261 m (856 ft)

Population (2025-12-31)
  - Total: 896
  - Density: 59.4/km^{2} (154/sq mi)
- Time zone: UTC+01:00 (CET)
  - Summer (DST): UTC+02:00 (CEST)
- Postal codes: 67725
- Dialling codes: 06357
- Vehicle registration: KIB
- Website: boerrstadt.de.tl

Börrstadt (German pronunciation: [ˈbœʁʃtat]) is a municipality in the Donnersbergkreis district, in Rhineland-Palatinate, Germany.
