= Falkenstein Castle (Palatinate) =

Castle in Germany

- Burg Falkenstein
- Falkenstein
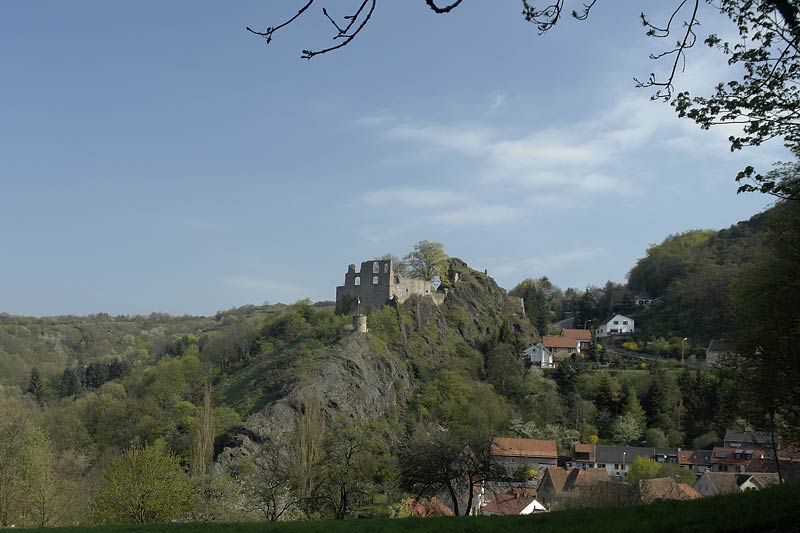
- Castle ruins and village of Falkenstein (2006)

Site information
- Type: hill castle
- Code: DE-RP
- Condition: ruin

Location
- Coordinates: 49°36′33.17″N 7°52′25.55″E
- Height: 425 m above sea level (NHN)

Site history
- Built: 1135

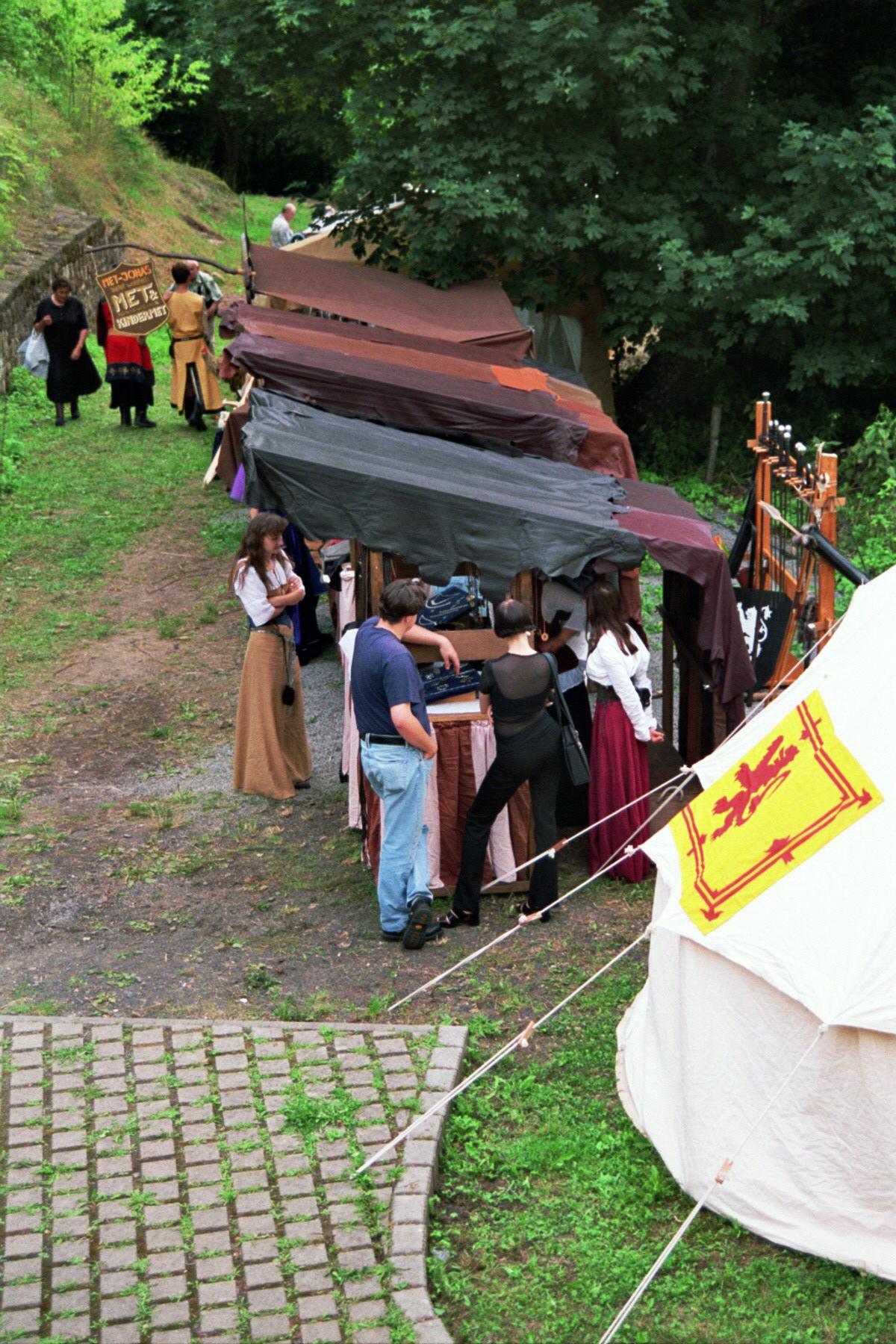
Medieval market at Falkenstein Castle

Falkenstein Castle (German: Burg Falkenstein) is a ruined hill castle (imperial castle) dating to the Middle Ages. It is situated above the eponymous village of Falkenstein on the Donnersberg, the highest point in the Palatinate region, which rises within the German state of Rhineland-Palatinate.

== History ==
For the political history see County of Falkenstein

Falkenstein is first recorded in 1135 as the castle of the lords of Falkenstein, a branch of the lords of Bolanden. It is mentioned again in 1233 in the possession of Philip I, the Lord of Falkenstein, the Imperial Chamberlain (Reichskämmerer) and burgvogt at Trifels Castle, where the Imperial Regalia were guarded. After the death of the imperial chamberlain of Münzenberg Philip I took over the office. In 1255 he inherited the Landvogtei in the Wetterau. Lich was later the centre of the territory of Philip I of Falkenstein. In the mid-14th century the Falkensteins built New Falkenstein in the Taunus region of Germany.

Around 1500 Uhland I acquired the castle rights and expanded the castle further. His descendants purchased Schloss Bertholdstein near the town of Fehring in the Styria in Austria and subsequently settled there.

In 1647 Falkenstein was besieged by French troops, stormed and slighted. In 1736, Falkenstein Castle and the County of Falkenstein went to the imperial House of Habsburg. In 1794, it was destroyed once more by the French during the Coalition Wars, since when it has remained a ruin, albeit partially restored after 1979.

== Description ==
Partly preserved are the bergfried, remains of the outer walls of the great hall (Ritterhaus), the shield wall, the enceinte and the cistern.

== Gallery ==
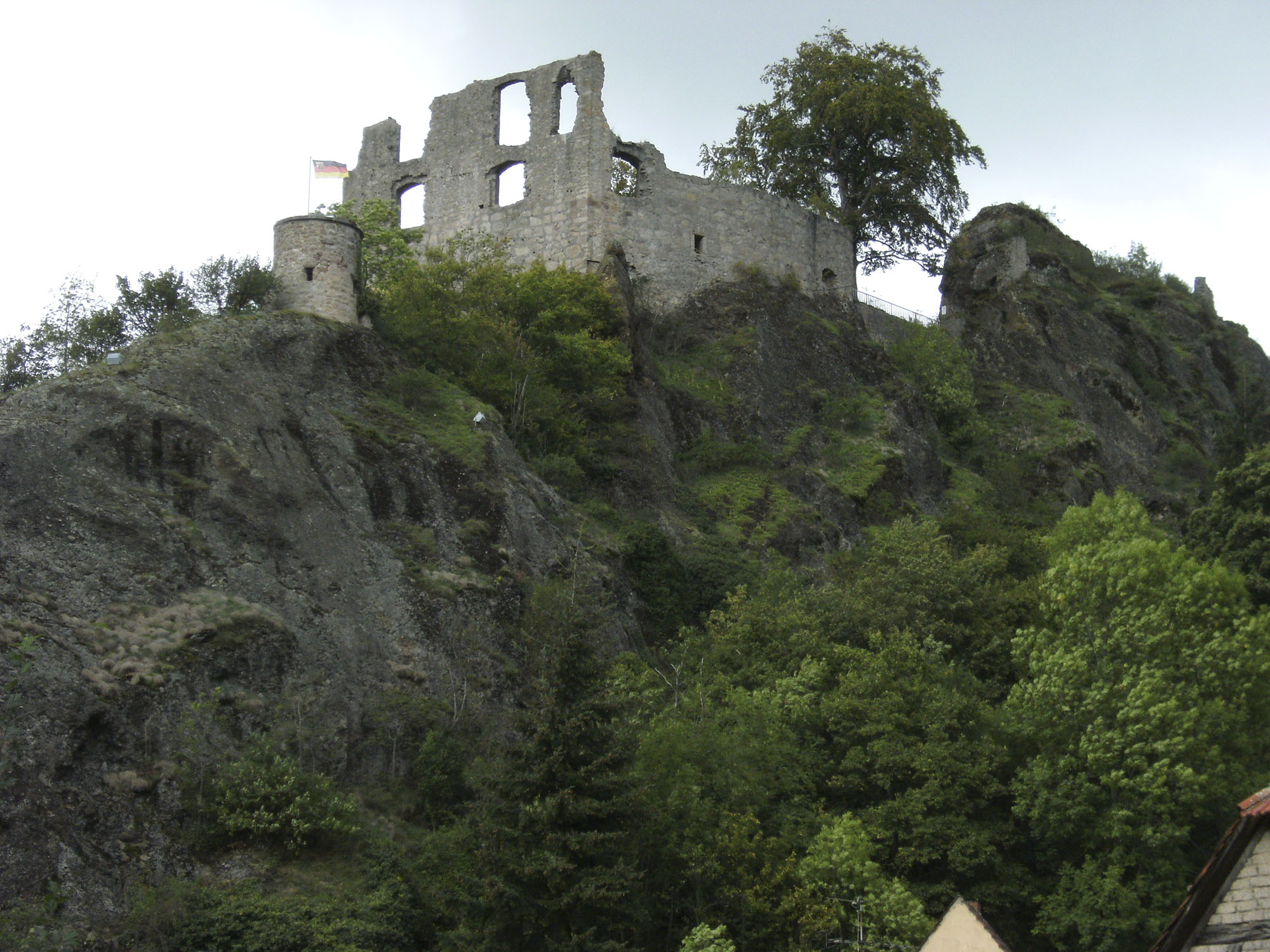
South side

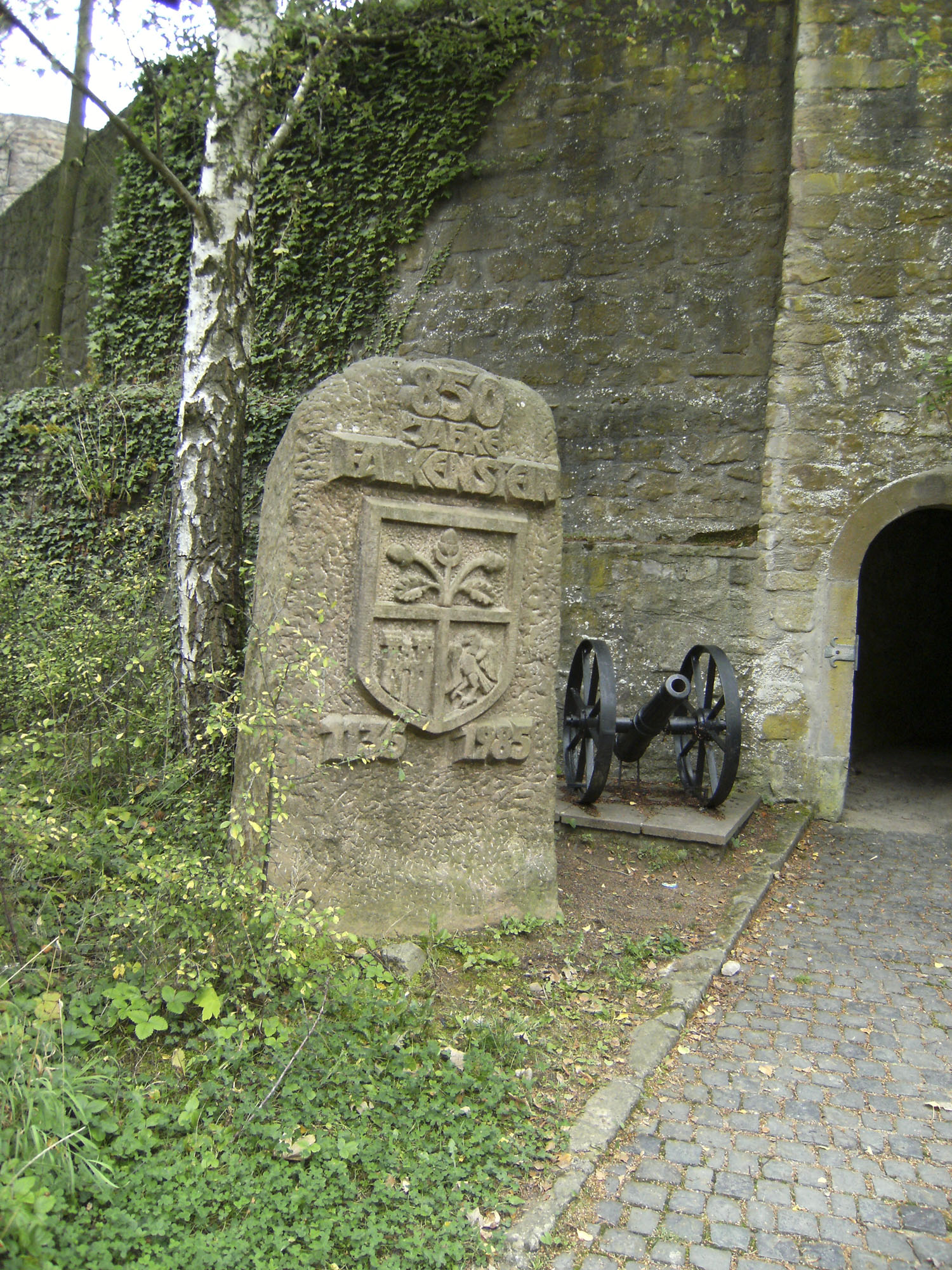
Stone recording its 850th anniversary

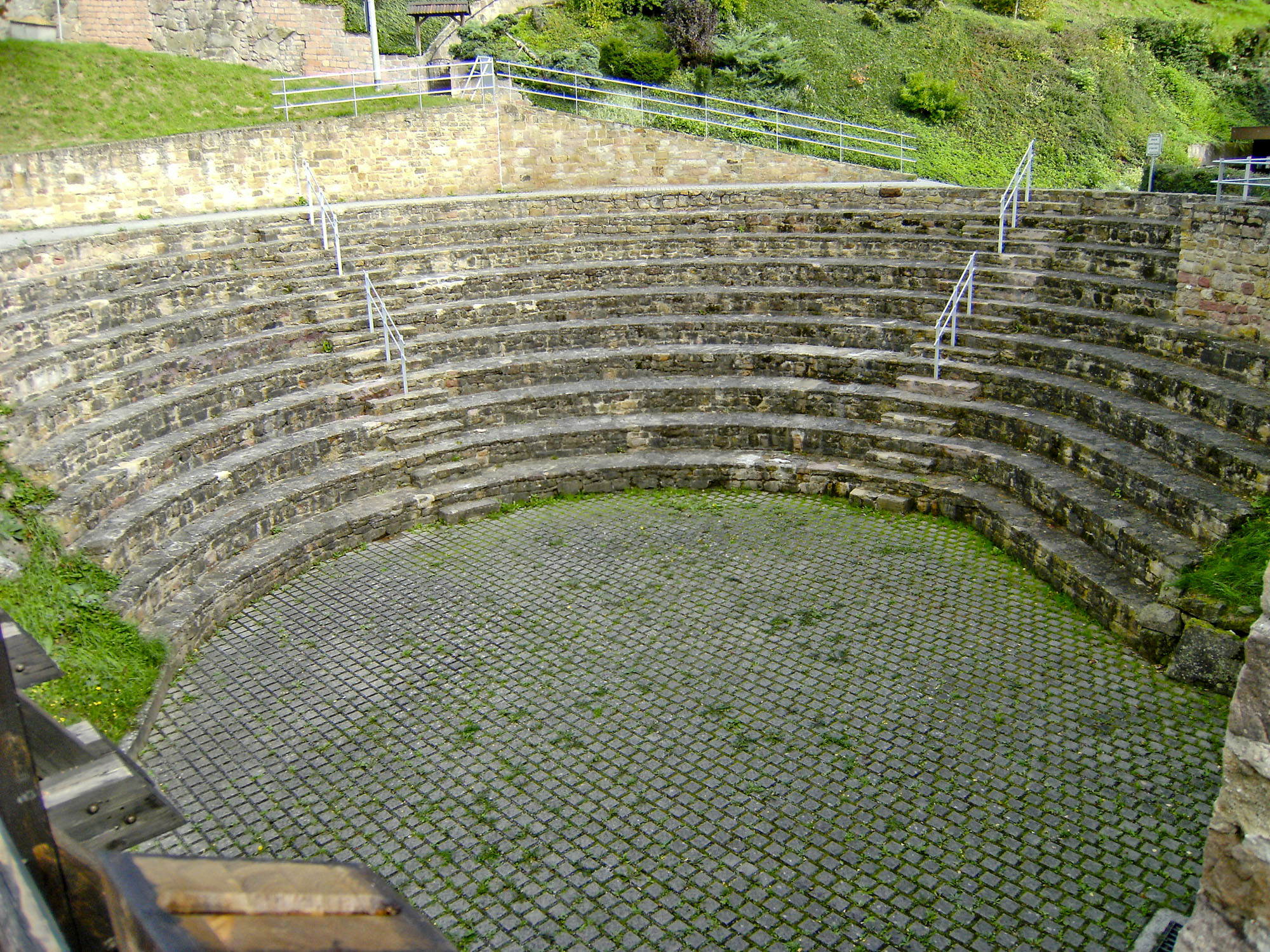
Amphitheatre

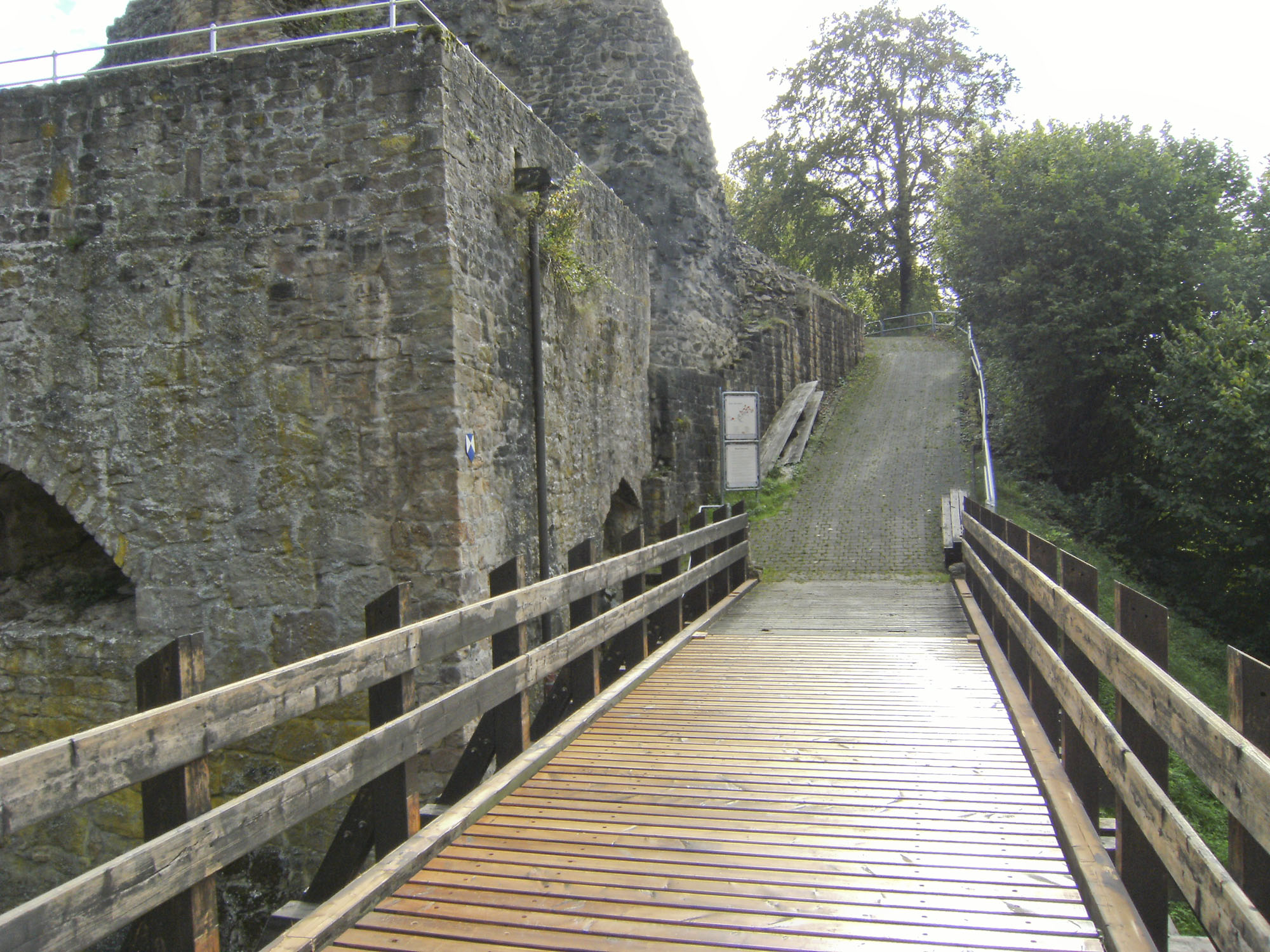
Present-day entrance

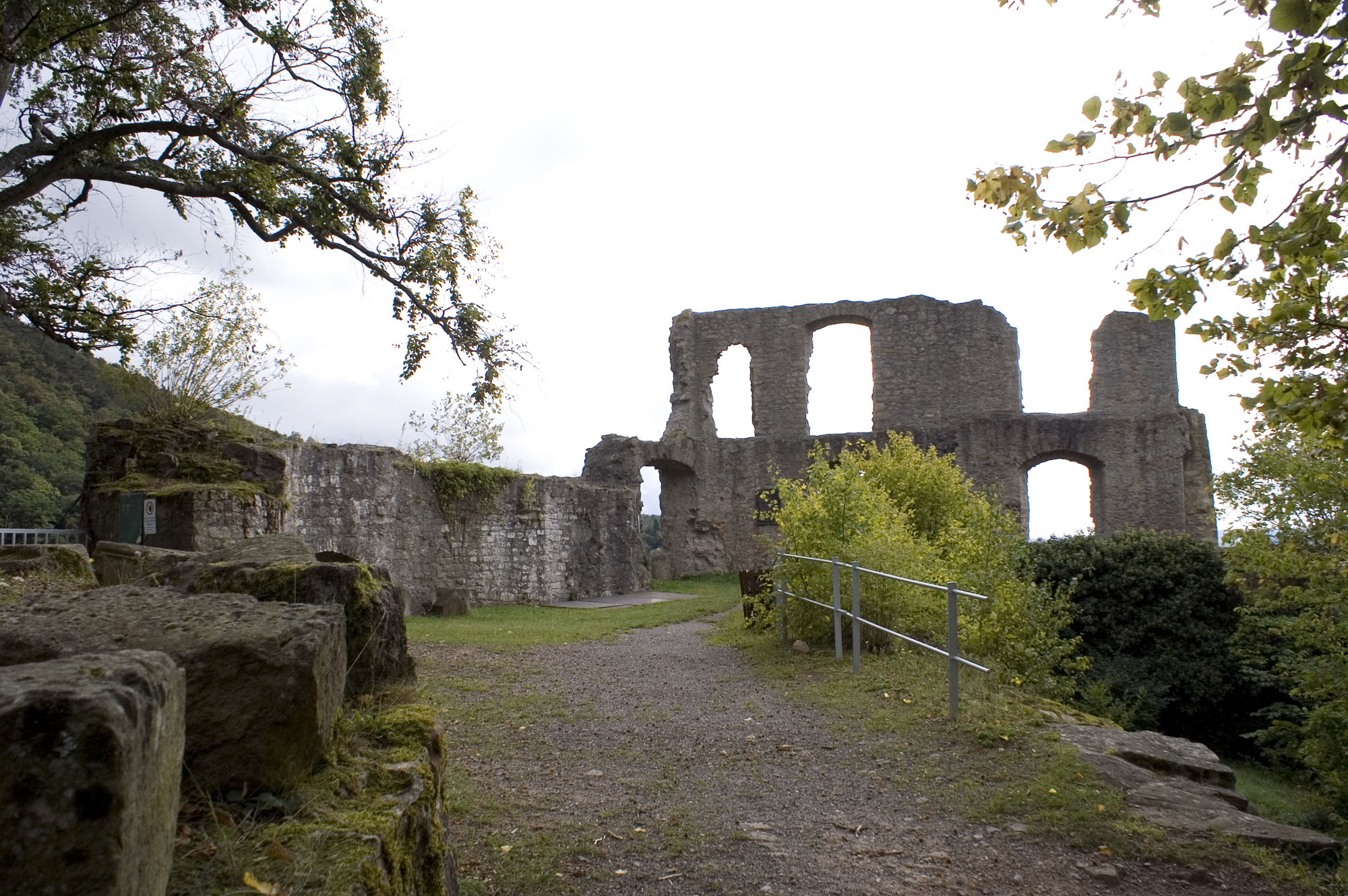
Courtyard

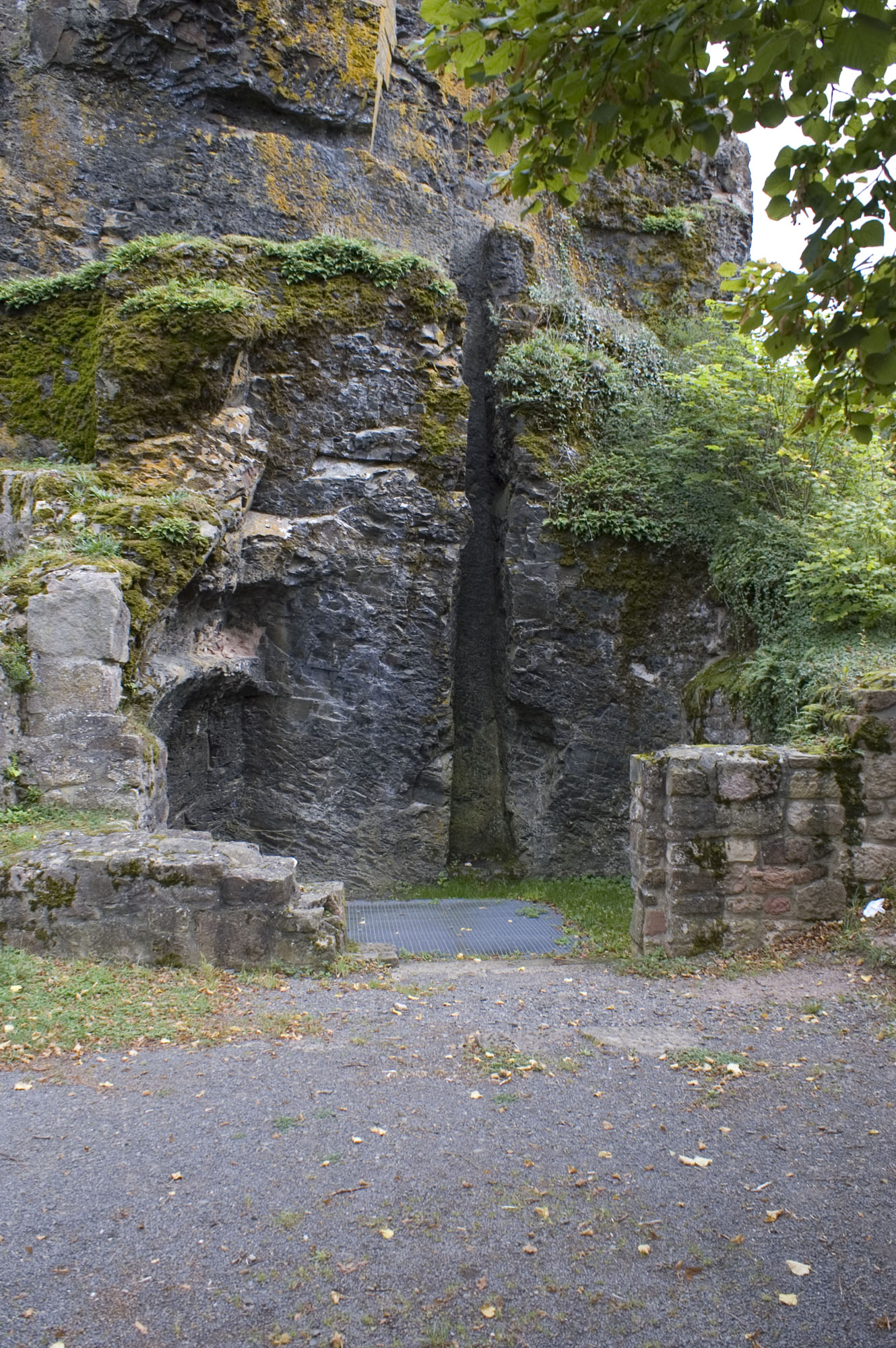
Cistern

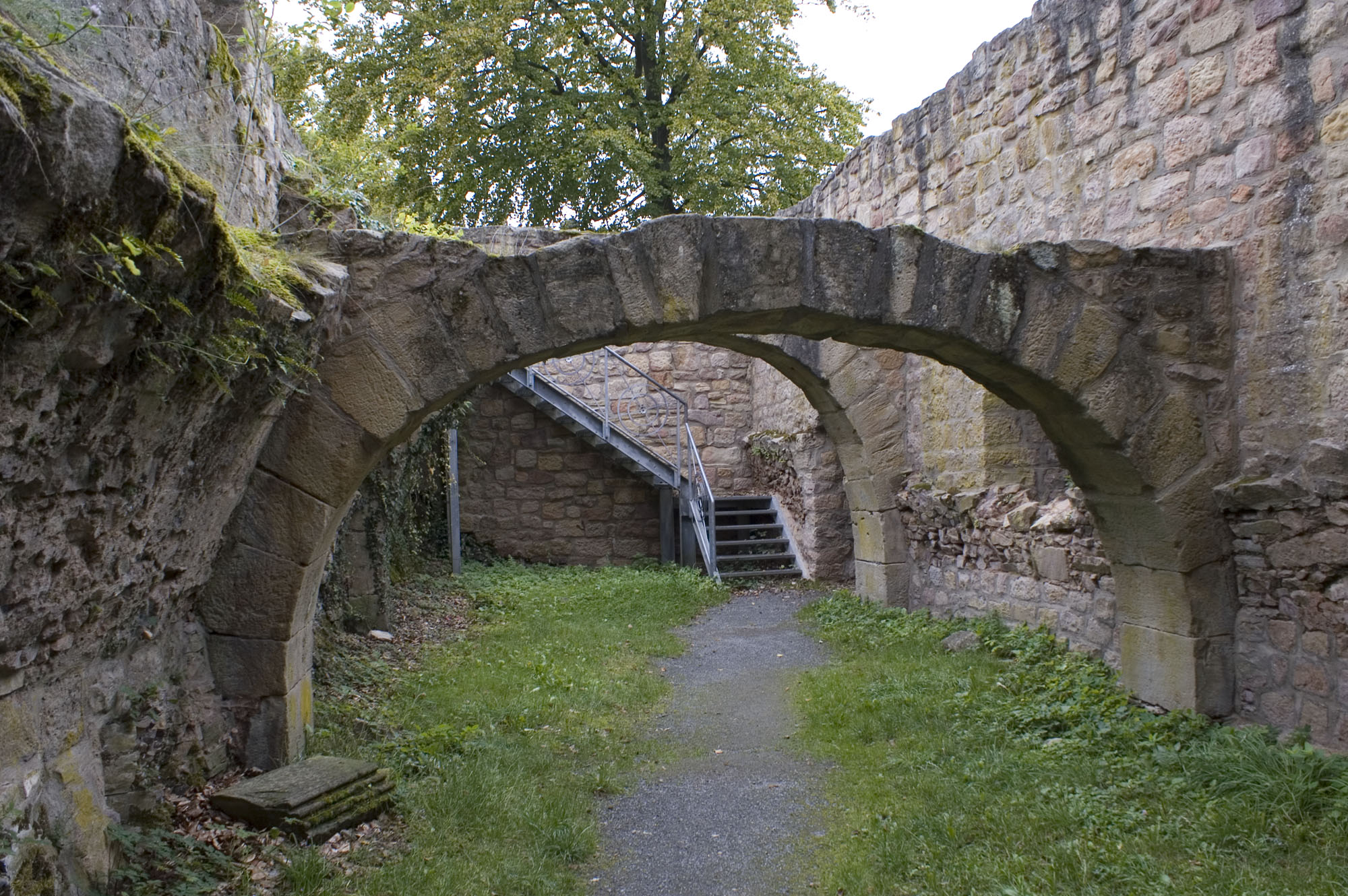
Interior view

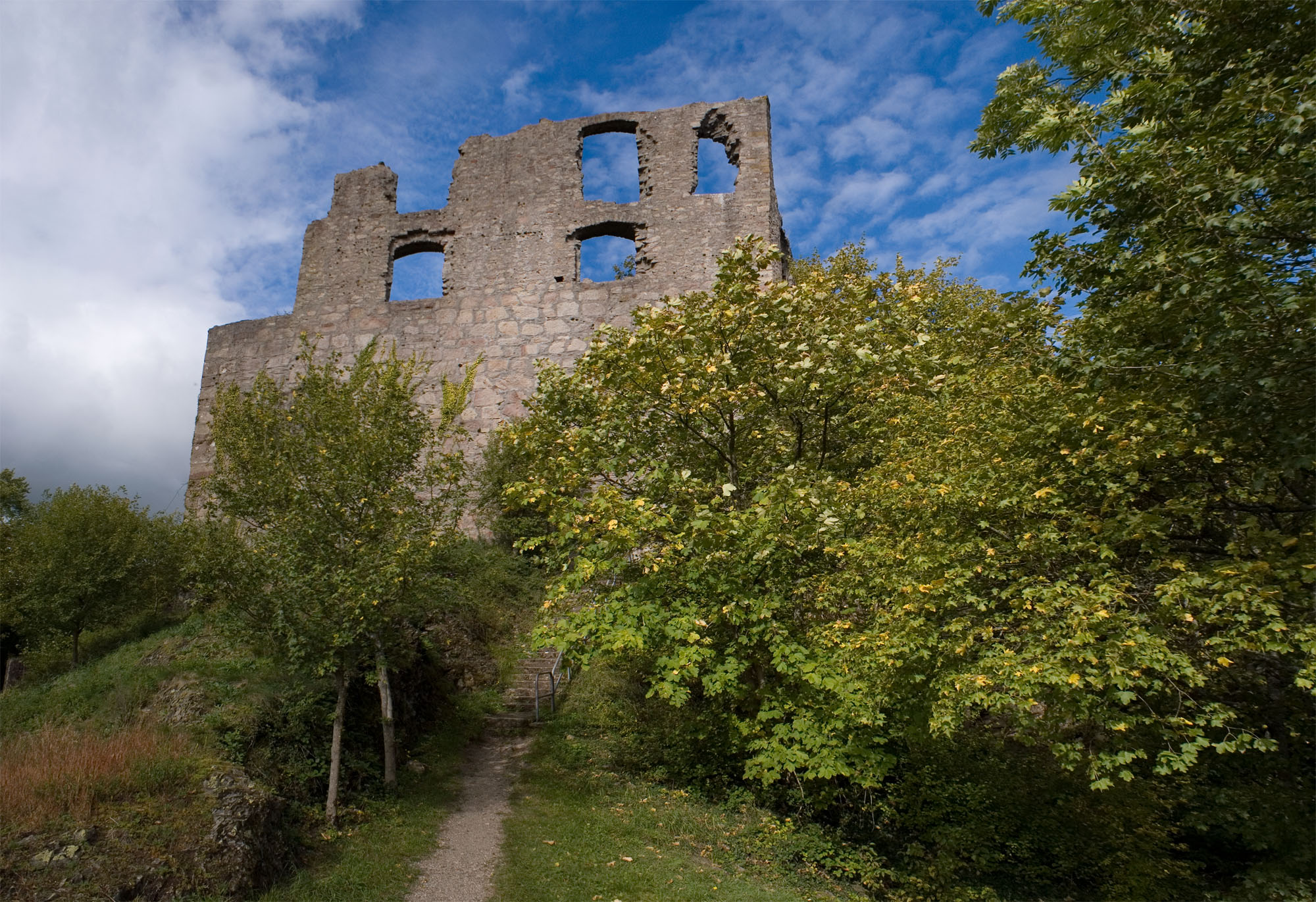
Southwest view of the Ritterhaus

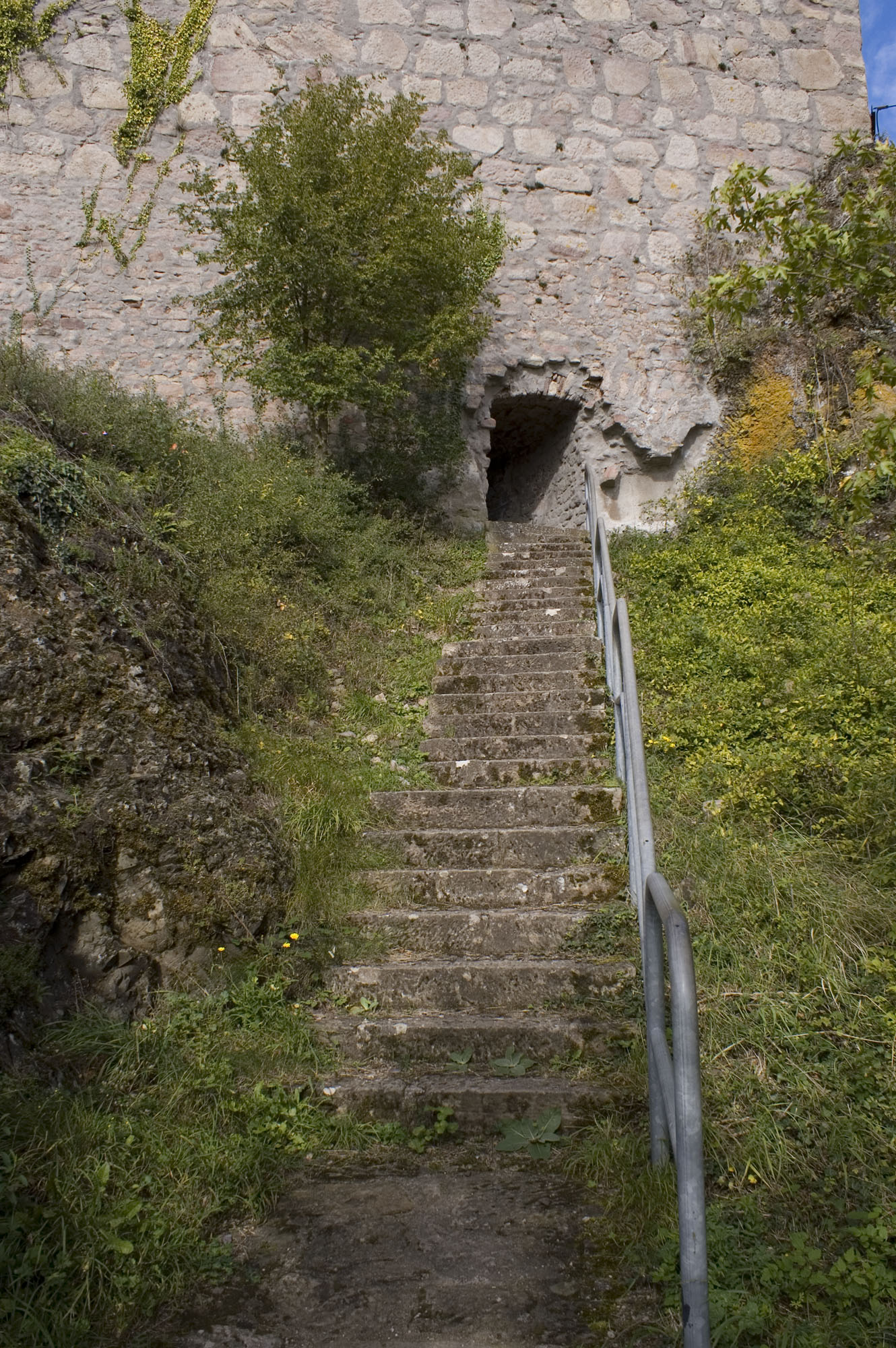
Staircase to the Ritterhaus

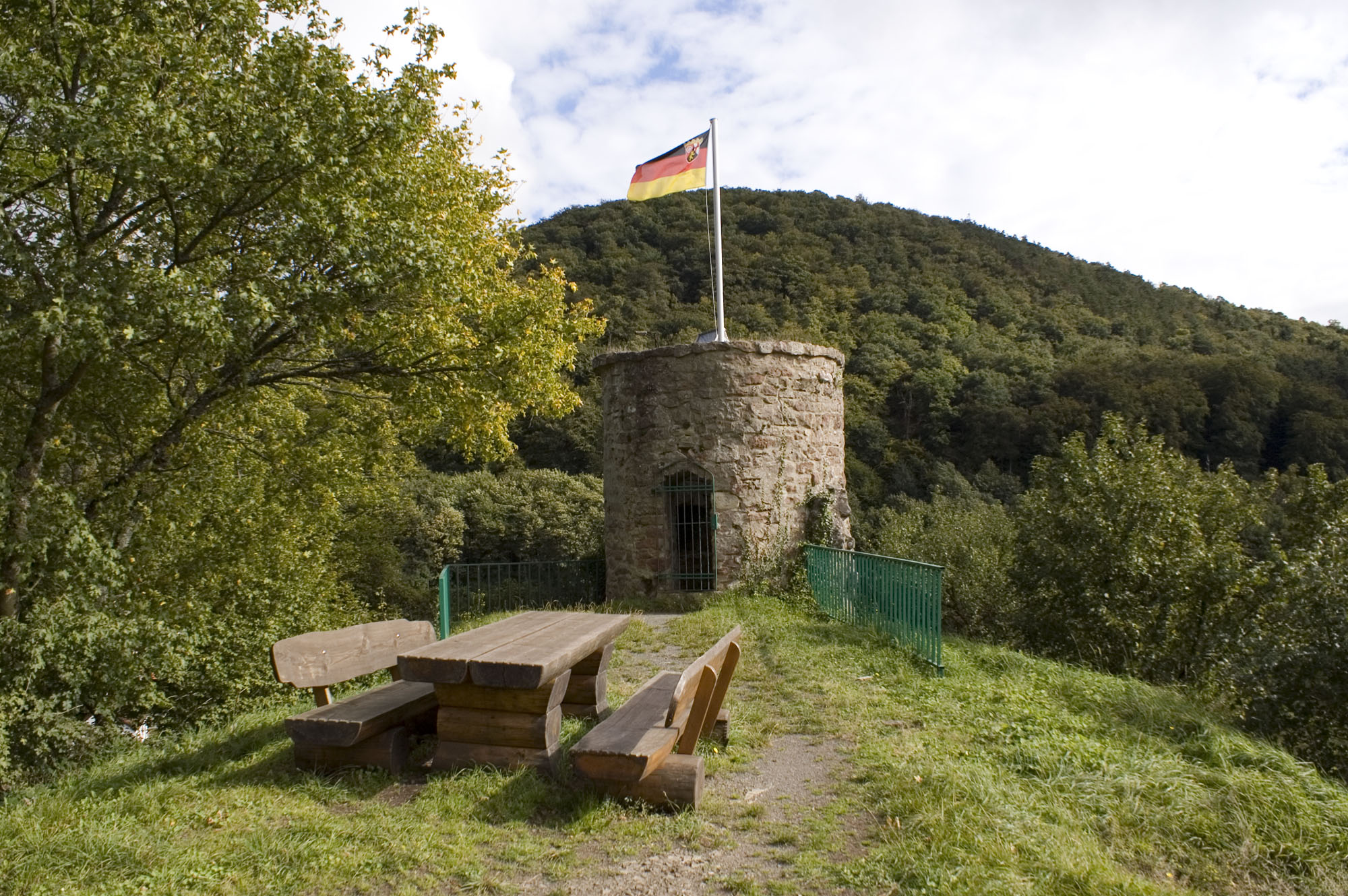
Guard tower

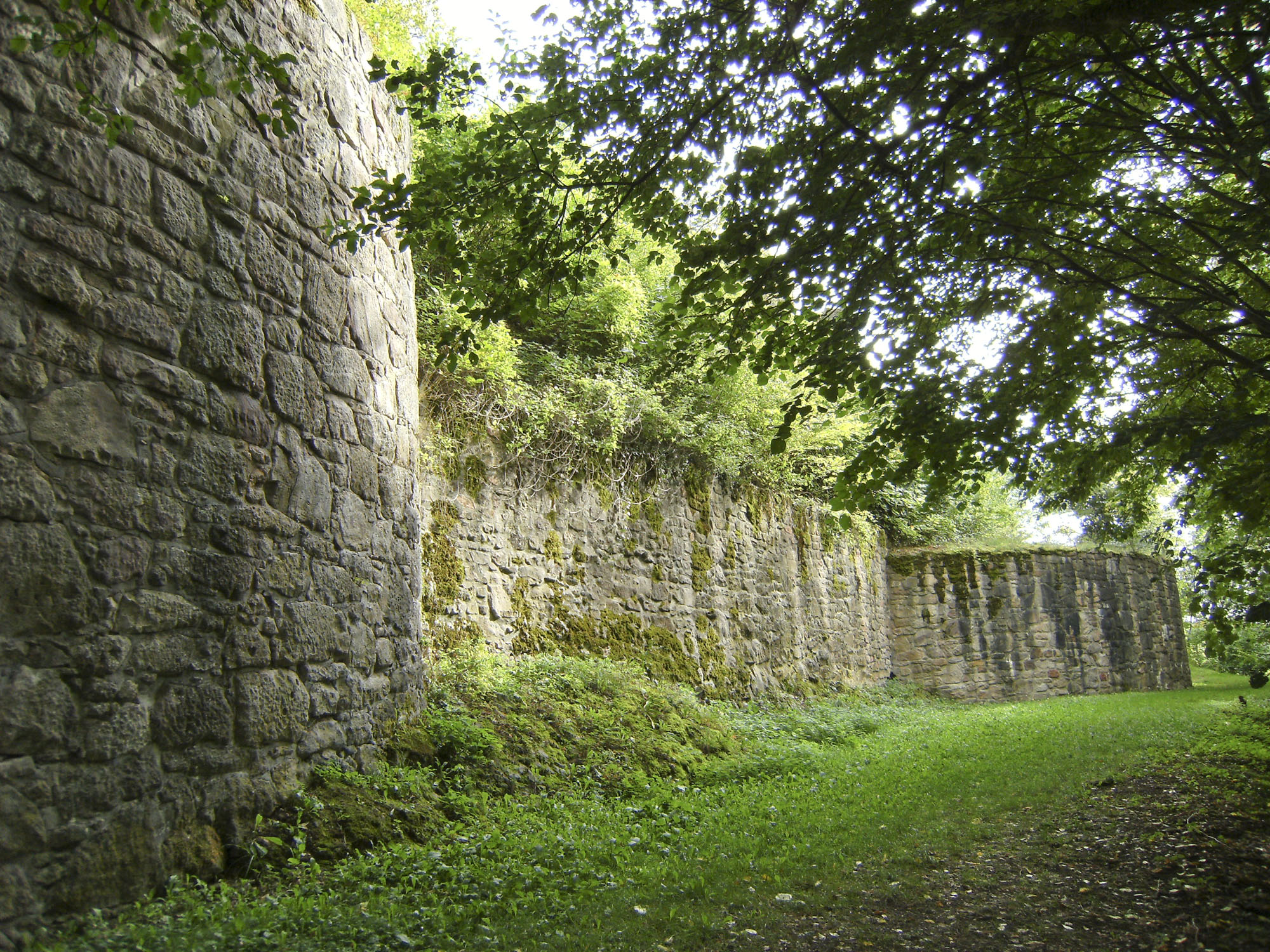
Enceinte

== Literature ==
- Jens Stöcker, Alexander Thon: Falkenstein/Donnersberg. In: Jürgen Keddigkeit, Alexander Thon and Rolf Übel (eds.): Pfälzisches Burgenlexikon. Beiträge zur pfälzischen Geschichte Bd. 12/2, Institut für Pfälzische Geschichte und Volkskunde, Kaiserslautern, 2002, pp. 46–59, ISBN 3-927754-48-X.
- Alexander Thon: Philipp I. von Falkenstein (1220/33 – 1270/71). Reichstruchsess und Reichskämmerer. In: Karl-Heinz Rothenberger (ed.): Pfälzische Geschichte. Vol. 1, 2., verb. Aufl. Institut für Pfälzische Geschichte und Volkskunde, Kaiserslautern, 2002, pp. 210−212, ISBN 3-927754-43-9.
- Alexander Thon (ed.): Wie Schwalbennester an den Felsen geklebt. Burgen in der Nordpfalz. 1st edn. Schnell + Steiner, Regensburg, 2005, pp. 48–53, ISBN 3-7954-1674-4.
