= Winnweiler (Verbandsgemeinde) =

Municipality in Rhineland-Palatinate, Germany

- Verbandsgemeinde
- Location of Winnweiler within Donnersbergkreis district
- Interactive map of Winnweiler
- Location within Germany Location within Rhineland-Palatinate
- Coordinates: 49°34′N 7°51′E
- Country: Germany
- State: Rhineland-Palatinate
- District: Donnersbergkreis
- Seat: Winnweiler
- Subdivisions: 13 municipalities

Area
  - Total: 111.16 km^{2} (42.92 sq mi)

Population (2025-12-31)
  - Total: 12,954
  - Density: 116.53/km^{2} (301.82/sq mi)
- Time zone: UTC+01:00 (CET)
  - Summer (DST): UTC+02:00 (CEST)
- Website: www.winnweiler-vg.de

Winnweiler is a Verbandsgemeinde ("collective municipality") in the Donnersbergkreis, in Rhineland-Palatinate, Germany. The seat of the Verbandsgemeinde is in Winnweiler.

The Verbandsgemeinde Winnweiler consists of the following Ortsgemeinden ("local municipalities"):

1. Börrstadt
2. Breunigweiler
3. Falkenstein
4. Gonbach
5. Höringen
6. Imsbach
7. Lohnsfeld
8. Münchweiler an der Alsenz
9. Schweisweiler
10. Sippersfeld
11. Steinbach am Donnersberg
12. Wartenberg-Rohrbach
13. Winnweiler
