= Werner von Falkenstein =

Archbishop-Elector of Trier

- Archbishop-Elector of Trier
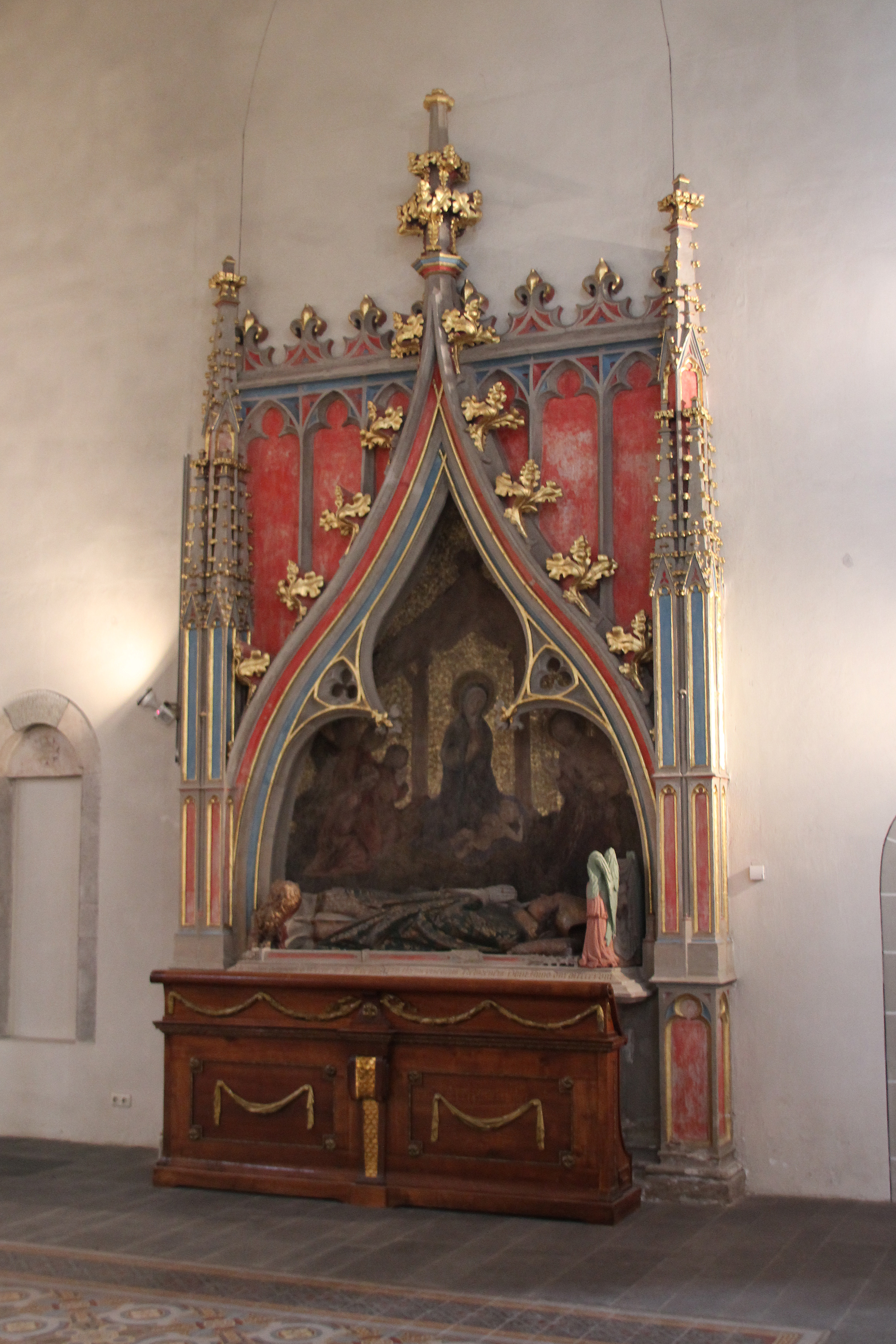
- Tomb in the Basilica of St. Castor in Koblenz
- Church: Catholic Church
- Archdiocese: Trier
- In office: 1388–1418
- Predecessor: Kuno II von Falkenstein
- Successor: Otto von Ziegenhain

Personal details
- Died: 4 October 1418

Werner von Falkenstein (c. 1355 – 4 October 1418) was a German nobleman who served as Archbishop and Elector of Trier from 1388 until his death in 1418. He was the great-nephew of his predecessor Kuno II von Falkenstein and a member of the House of Falkenstein.

== Life ==
Falkenstein was born around 1355 probably at Falkenstein Castle in what is now the German state of Rhineland-Palatinate. He was the eldest son of Philip VI von Falkenstein (before 1332–1374) and his second wife Agnes von Falkenstein-Münzenberg (c. 1337–1383). He initially served as Archdeacon of Trier and was appointed provost of St. Florin at Koblenz on 16 June 1384, and later provost of the Basilica of St. Paulinus, Trier. After the resignation of his great-uncle, Archbishop Kuno, on 6 January 1388, he became coadjutor and, on 3 April, was appointed archbishop by Pope Urban VI. On 21 September 1388 he was consecrated as both priest and bishop.

On becoming bishop, Falkenstein successfully rejected his relatives claims to the money Kuno had accumulated in Trier, and used it to finance his numerous feuds, which he had with the Lords of Schleiden, Waldeck, Ehrenberg, the Counts Katzenelnbogen at Rheinfels Castle, and the cities of Oberwesel and St. Goar. The war with Oberwesel, the Weseler War or Weseler Feud, resulted from the king, Henry VII, pledging that imperial city, which was endowed with numerous rights and privileges, to his brother, Baldwin of Luxembourg, Archbishop of Trier, in 1309 and finally in 1312. In 1389 von Falkenstein, as sovereign and local ruler, began a year-long siege of the city, in which cannon was also used. Because the Lords of the Schönburg switched over to his side, Wesel stood alone in the fight to preserve its rights. A mutual arrangement ended the war, but the status of Wesel as a Free imperial city (Reichsstadt) was not restored.

The country was devastated by the feuds, the state went bankrupt, and Werner III was confronted with a strong opposition in the cathedral chapter of Trier, which, in 1399, requested that Pope Boniface IX appoint a coadjutor at the side of the ailing archbishop, but this did not happen.

In 1402 von Falkenstein had the Wernerseck Castle, named after him, built in Pellenz as a border fortress against the Archbishop of Cologne. In Mayen, on 24 July 1405, he move the three annual markets, previously held on feasts of the Virgin Mary, to other dates, and with them the traditional Lukasmarkt to the Sunday after the Feast of Saint Luke, on 18 October.

Archbishop Werner played no decisive part in the councils of Pisa (1409) and Constance. He left the burden of these tasks to his future successor as archbishop, the provost Otto von Ziegenhain. He died on 4 October 1418 at Peterseck Castle during an attack on St. Goar and was buried in the choir of the Basilica of St. Castor in Koblenz.
