= Höringen =

- Municipality
- Coat of arms

- Location of Höringen within Donnersbergkreis district
- Interactive map of Höringen
- Location within Germany Location within Rhineland-Palatinate
- Coordinates: 49°33′19.20″N 7°47′49.11″E
- Country: Germany
- State: Rhineland-Palatinate
- District: Donnersbergkreis
- Municipal assoc.: Winnweiler

Government
  - Mayor (2019–24): Brigitte Enders

Area
  - Total: 10.73 km^{2} (4.14 sq mi)
- Elevation: 291 m (955 ft)

Population (2025-12-31)
  - Total: 654
  - Density: 61.0/km^{2} (158/sq mi)
- Time zone: UTC+01:00 (CET)
  - Summer (DST): UTC+02:00 (CEST)
- Postal codes: 67724
- Dialling codes: 06302
- Vehicle registration: KIB
- Website: www.hoeringen.de

Höringen (German pronunciation: [ˈhøːʁɪŋən]) is a municipality in the Donnersbergkreis district, in Rhineland-Palatinate, Germany.
