= Imsbach =

- Municipality
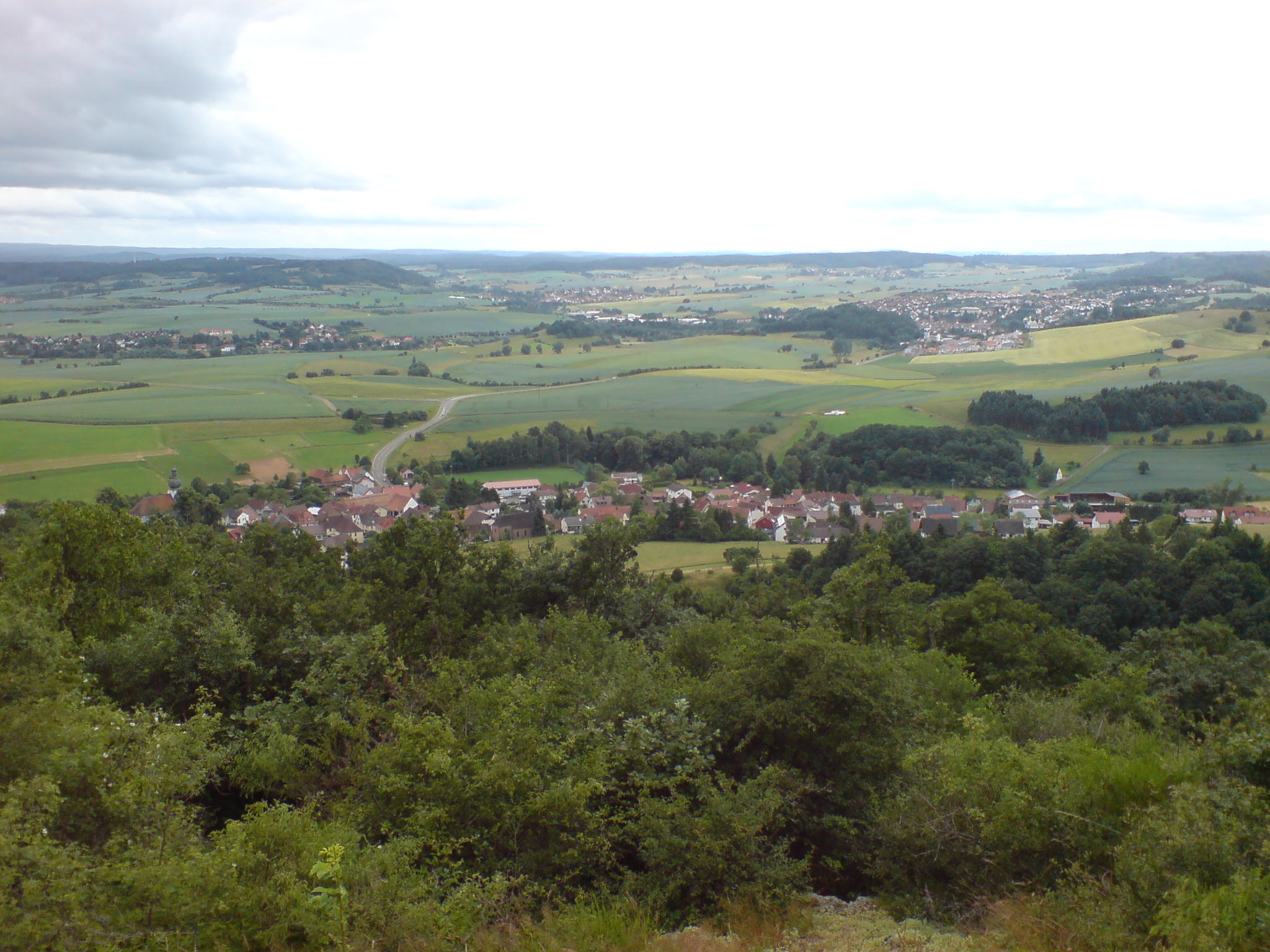
- Imsbach

- Coat of arms

- Location of Imsbach within Donnersbergkreis district
- Interactive map of Imsbach
- Location within Germany Location within Rhineland-Palatinate
- Coordinates: 49°34′59″N 7°52′57″E
- Country: Germany
- State: Rhineland-Palatinate
- District: Donnersbergkreis
- Municipal assoc.: Winnweiler

Government
  - Mayor (2019–24): Oliver Krupp

Area
  - Total: 8.89 km^{2} (3.43 sq mi)
- Elevation: 293 m (961 ft)

Population (2025-12-31)
  - Total: 869
  - Density: 97.8/km^{2} (253/sq mi)
- Time zone: UTC+01:00 (CET)
  - Summer (DST): UTC+02:00 (CEST)
- Postal codes: 67817
- Dialling codes: 06302, 06357
- Vehicle registration: KIB

Imsbach is a municipality in the Donnersbergkreis district, in Rhineland-Palatinate, Germany.
