= Wartenberg-Rohrbach =

- Municipality
- Coat of arms

- Location of Wartenberg-Rohrbach within Donnersbergkreis district
- Interactive map of Wartenberg-Rohrbach
- Location within Germany Location within Rhineland-Palatinate
- Coordinates: 49°31′34″N 7°51′12″E
- Country: Germany
- State: Rhineland-Palatinate
- District: Donnersbergkreis
- Municipal assoc.: Winnweiler

Government
  - Mayor (2019–24): Dagmar Schneider-Heinz

Area
  - Total: 4.48 km^{2} (1.73 sq mi)
- Elevation: 266 m (873 ft)

Population (2025-12-31)
  - Total: 447
  - Density: 99.8/km^{2} (258/sq mi)
- Time zone: UTC+01:00 (CET)
  - Summer (DST): UTC+02:00 (CEST)
- Postal codes: 67681
- Dialling codes: 06302
- Vehicle registration: KIB

Wartenberg-Rohrbach (German pronunciation: [ˈvaʁtn̩bɛʁk ˈʁoːɐ̯bax]) is a municipality in the Donnersbergkreis district, in Rhineland-Palatinate, Germany.
