= Münchweiler an der Alsenz =

- Municipality
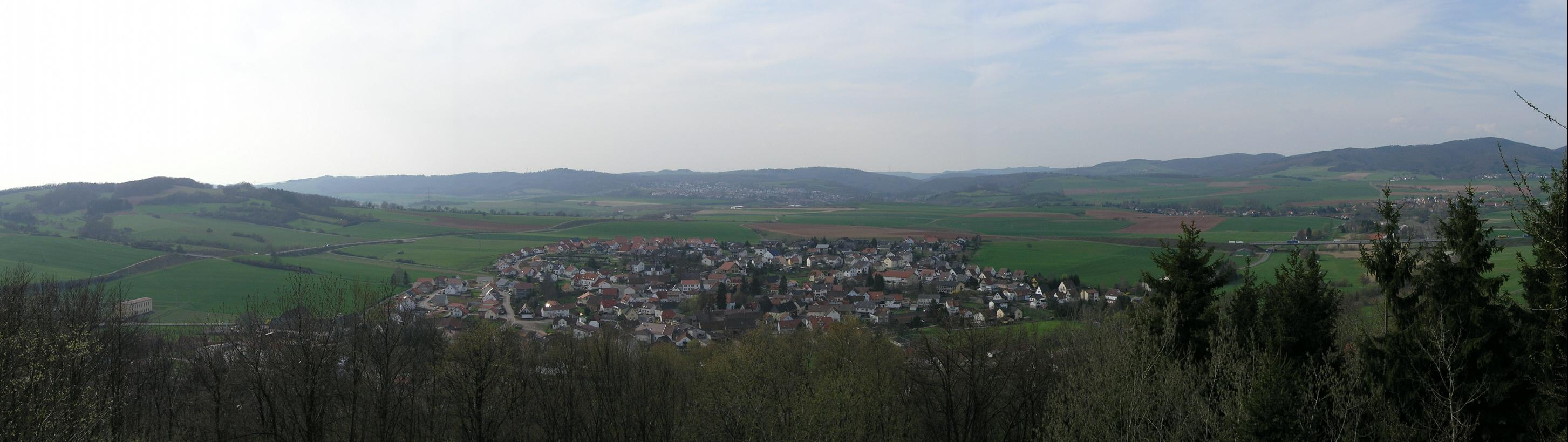

- Coat of arms

- Location of Münchweiler an der Alsenz within Donnersbergkreis district
- Interactive map of Münchweiler an der Alsenz
- Location within Germany Location within Rhineland-Palatinate
- Coordinates: 49°32′59″N 7°53′15″E
- Country: Germany
- State: Rhineland-Palatinate
- District: Donnersbergkreis
- Municipal assoc.: Winnweiler

Government
  - Mayor (2019–24): Christoph Stumpf (SPD)

Area
  - Total: 7.09 km^{2} (2.74 sq mi)
- Elevation: 259 m (850 ft)

Population (2025-12-31)
  - Total: 1,192
  - Density: 168/km^{2} (435/sq mi)
- Time zone: UTC+01:00 (CET)
  - Summer (DST): UTC+02:00 (CEST)
- Postal codes: 67728
- Dialling codes: 06302
- Vehicle registration: KIB

Münchweiler an der Alsenz (German pronunciation: [ˈmʏnçvaɪlɐ ʔan deːɐ̯ ˈʔalzɛnts], lit. 'Münchweiler on the Alsenz') is a municipality in the Donnersbergkreis district, in Rhineland-Palatinate, Germany.
