= Counts of Falkenstein (Rhineland-Palatinate) =

Noble family in Germany

Coat of arms of the lordship of Falkenstein

Coat of arms of the House of Bolanden, progenitors of the Counts of Falkenstein

The Counts of Falkenstein was a dynasty of German nobility descending from the Ministeriales of Bolanden, who held land and a castle at Falkenstein in the Palatinate region.

== History ==
Philipp IV of Bolanden, a treasurer to the Emperor and guardian of the Imperial Regalia at Trifels Castle, was the founder of the Falkenstein line. He married Isengard, heiress of the County of Hagen-Münzenberg in the Wetterau, in the Frankfurt/Rhine-Main region, and took his residence at Falkenstein Castle. Philipp henceforth became known as Philipp I of Falkenstein, his family bore the name Bolanden-Falkenstein. In 1255 they became titular counts of the land inherited by marriage from the Counts of Hagen-Münzenberg. At Königstein im Taunus they built their new castle Neufalkenstein. The Falkensteins also inherited the town of Offenbach am Main from the Counts of Münzenberg, which they pledged to the neighbouring Imperial city of Frankfurt am Main for the sum of 1,000 Gulden in 1372.

Count Werner III of Falkenstein was Archbishop of Trier from 1388 until his death in 1418. He is remembered for his provocation against the citizens of Frankfurt by developing rivalry with that town and Offenbach.

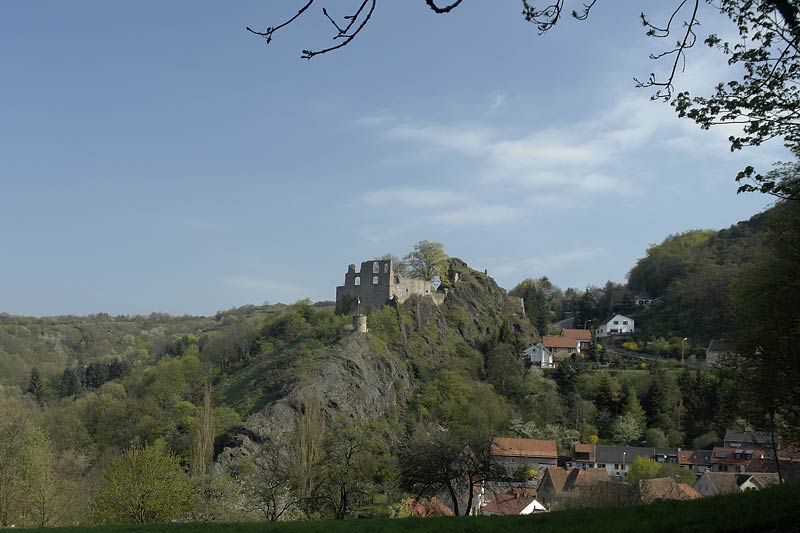
Falkenstein Castle (Palatinate)

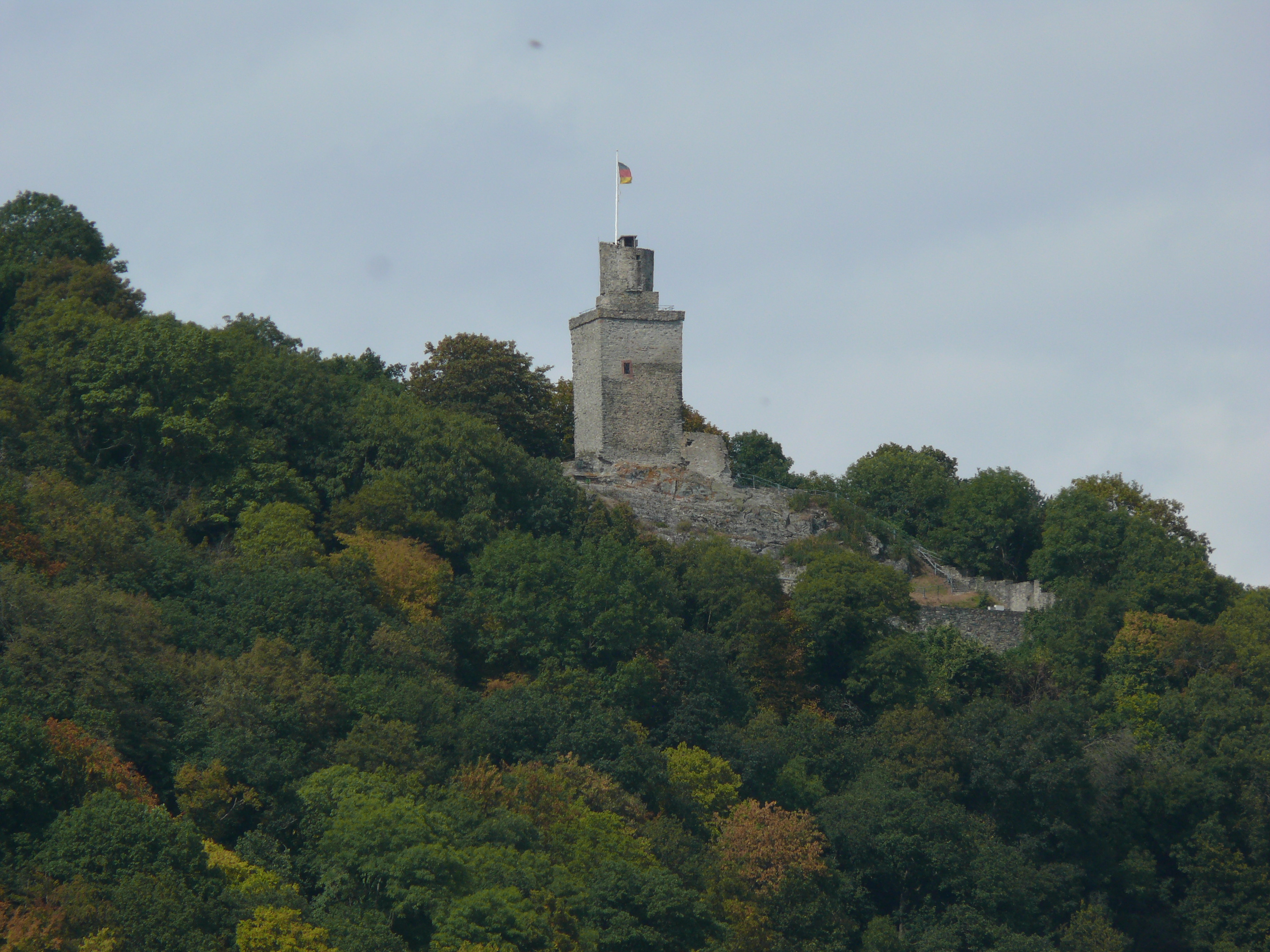
Falkenstein Castle (Taunus) (Neufalkenstein)

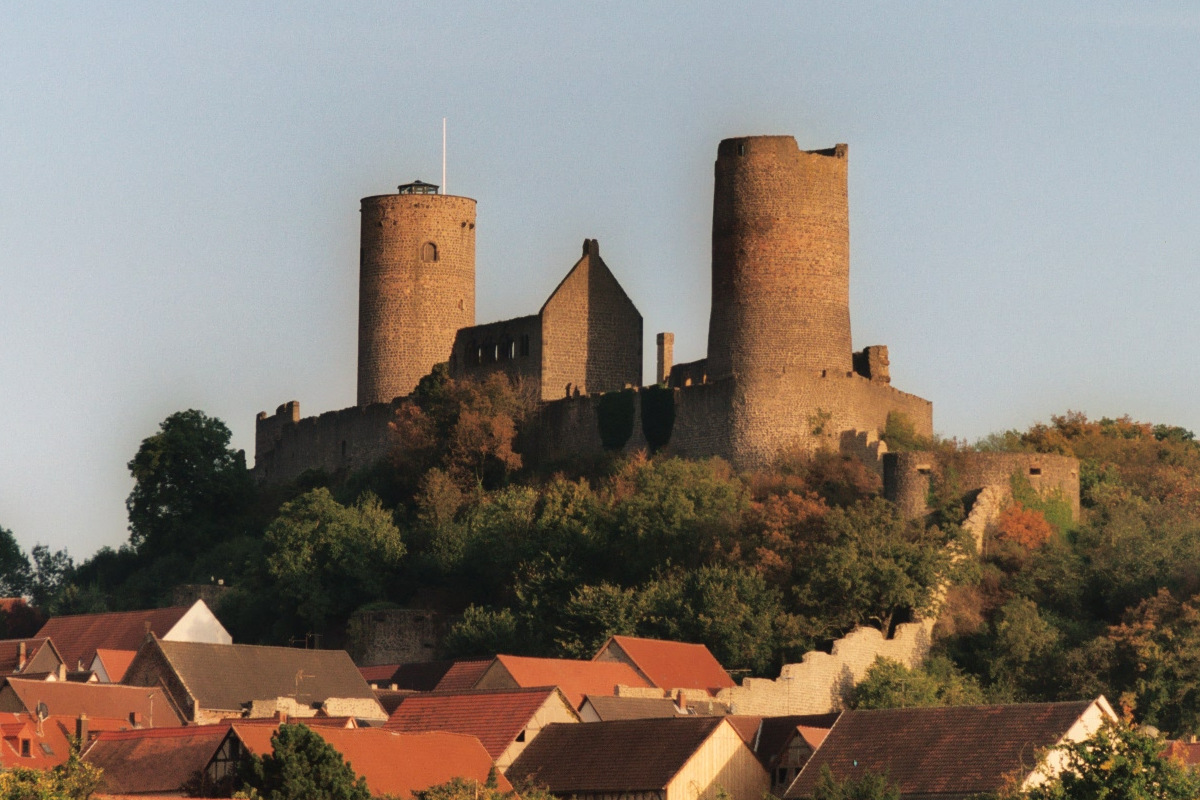
Münzenberg Castle
