= Schweisweiler =

- Municipality
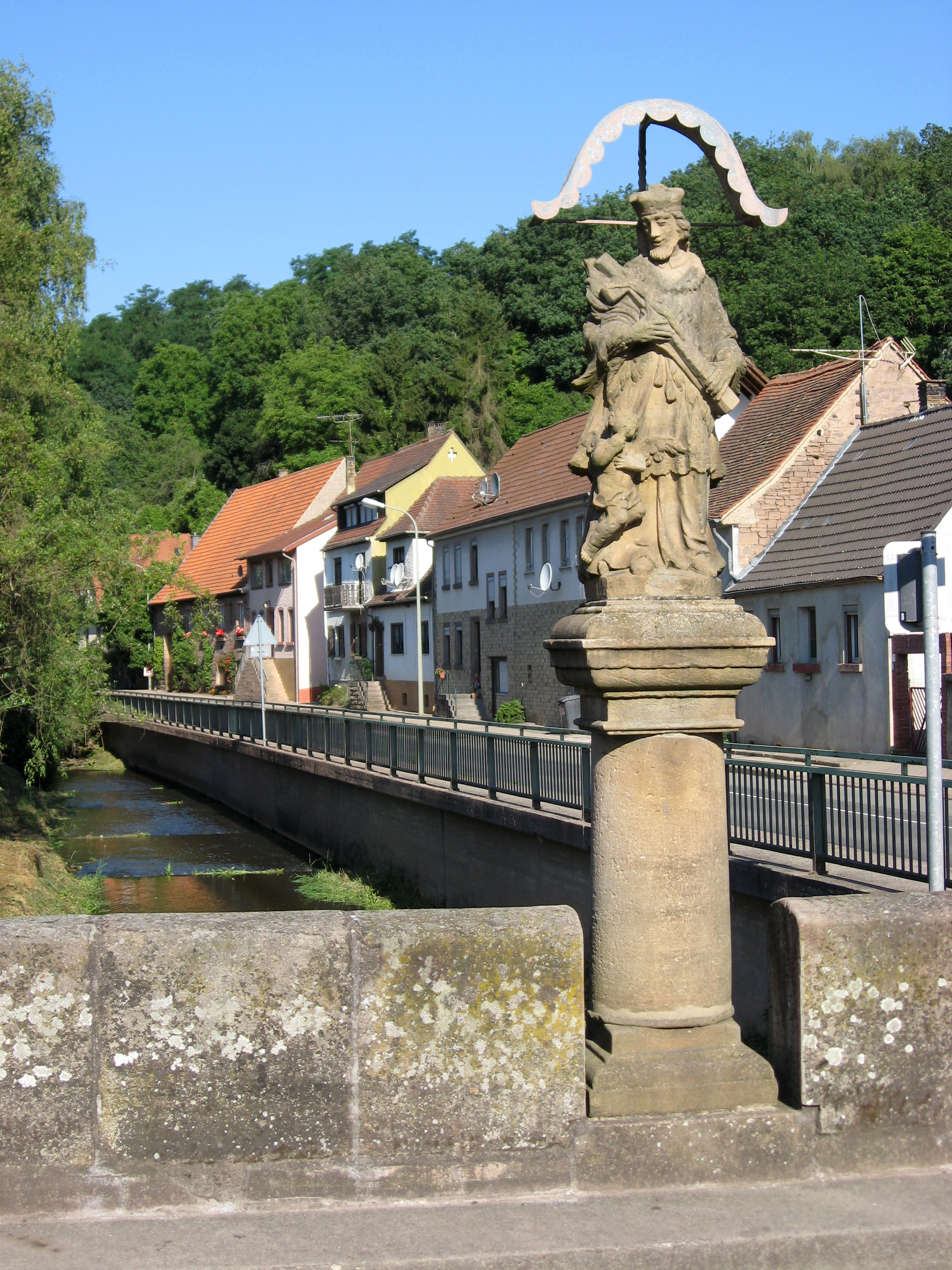
- Saint Nepomuk statue

- Coat of arms

- Location of Schweisweiler within Donnersbergkreis district
- Interactive map of Schweisweiler
- Location within Germany Location within Rhineland-Palatinate
- Coordinates: 49°35′27.21″N 7°49′25.74″E
- Country: Germany
- State: Rhineland-Palatinate
- District: Donnersbergkreis
- Municipal assoc.: Winnweiler

Government
  - Mayor (2019–24): Lothar Wichlidal

Area
  - Total: 4.85 km^{2} (1.87 sq mi)
- Elevation: 223 m (732 ft)

Population (2025-12-31)
  - Total: 330
  - Density: 68/km^{2} (180/sq mi)
- Time zone: UTC+01:00 (CET)
  - Summer (DST): UTC+02:00 (CEST)
- Postal codes: 67808
- Dialling codes: 06302
- Vehicle registration: KIB

Schweisweiler (German pronunciation: [ˈʃvaɪsvaɪlɐ]) is a municipality in the Donnersbergkreis district, in Rhineland-Palatinate, Germany.

== Historic buildings and monuments ==
There are ten historic buildings in Schweisweiler, including four wood beamed houses dating from the 1780s, the village church, and the local community hall. There are five additional monuments within the local area that are within a moderate walking distance. The historic buildings and a local area map showing the monuments are included on an informational board on the street across from the community hall.

== Museum ==
Leo's Tenne is both a museum and a meeting place with seating for up to 35 people. The museum has tools and equipment on display that show crafts prevalent in the local area over 150 years ago. Of interest are the agricultural, foundry and blacksmithing tools that can still be used to demonstrate early craftsmanship. Tours are given from Late April to Late October.

== Clubs ==
The Fishing Club (Fischerverein) promotes fishing within the community.

The Exercise Club (Turnverein) holds gymnastic and exercise classes for young children, has separate men's/women's exercise classes.

The Gun Club (Schützenverein) has a wide variety of sport shooting activities. Activities range from air rifle to large caliber shooting on a 50-meter range.

The Soccer Fan Club (Betzedeivel) supports the region's professional soccer team the 1st Football Club Kaiserslautern (1FCK), better known as the "Red Devils".

The Volunteer Fire Department Supporters (Freiwillig Feuerwehr Förderverein) brings together supporters of the volunteer fire department, holds fund-raising events, and provides fire fighting protective gear at no cost to volunteer firefighters.

== Religion ==
The village has a Catholic church with services held on Sundays and holidays.

== Theater ==
The village has a theater group made mostly up of local people. Plays involving current social themes are intertwined with the local dialect to produce region-specific social commentary. Performances are held in the village community hall once a year, four times (over two weekends).

== Nature ==
The village is located in a valley with walking areas on each side of the valley. The south side of the village has a nature trail (Naturlehrpfad) with signs detailing specific types of trees and vegetation. There are several information posters and learning experiments along the approximately 1 mile (1.6 km) trail.
