= Palatine Ridgeway =

Hiking trails in Rhineland-Palatinate

The Palatine Ridgeway (German: Pfälzer Höhenweg) in the North Palatine Uplands of Germany is 112 kilometres (70 mi) long and has seven recommended day stages. It is the third longest Prädikat path in the Palatinate region after the Palatine Wine Trail and Palatine Forest Trail. The long distance path was opened in the autumn of 2010. One year later, in September 2011, it was given its status as a Prädikat path.

== Route ==
The Palatine Ridgeway runs in a semi-circle initially north around the Donnersberg, the highest mountain in the North Palatine Uplands and the whole Palatinate, then through the valleys northwest of the massif. The start point in the east is Winnweiler, and the finish point in the west is Wolfstein station. Opened in spring 2011 the hiking trail runs entirely within the North Palatine Uplands. Its waymark and logo, like the other two paths, is a hillside in a rectangular field, but with the difference that it is in blue and white, and has a stylised cloud and the name of the path.

== Character ==
The path, with its climbs and descents, runs through one of the most important tourist attractions of the Palatinate: the large, forested, hill range of the North Palatine Uplands. The route has 3,300 metres (10,800 ft) of uphill and 3,200 metres (10,500 ft) of the downhill gradient. Its lowest point is at 148 metres (486 ft) in the small town of Meisenheim and its highest point, at 687 metres (2,254 ft), is the summit of the Donnersberg. In addition, the trail runs in places through the valleys of the Alsenz, Moschel, Glan and Lauter, which belong to the river system of the Rhine tributary, the Nahe.

== Stations and selected sights ==
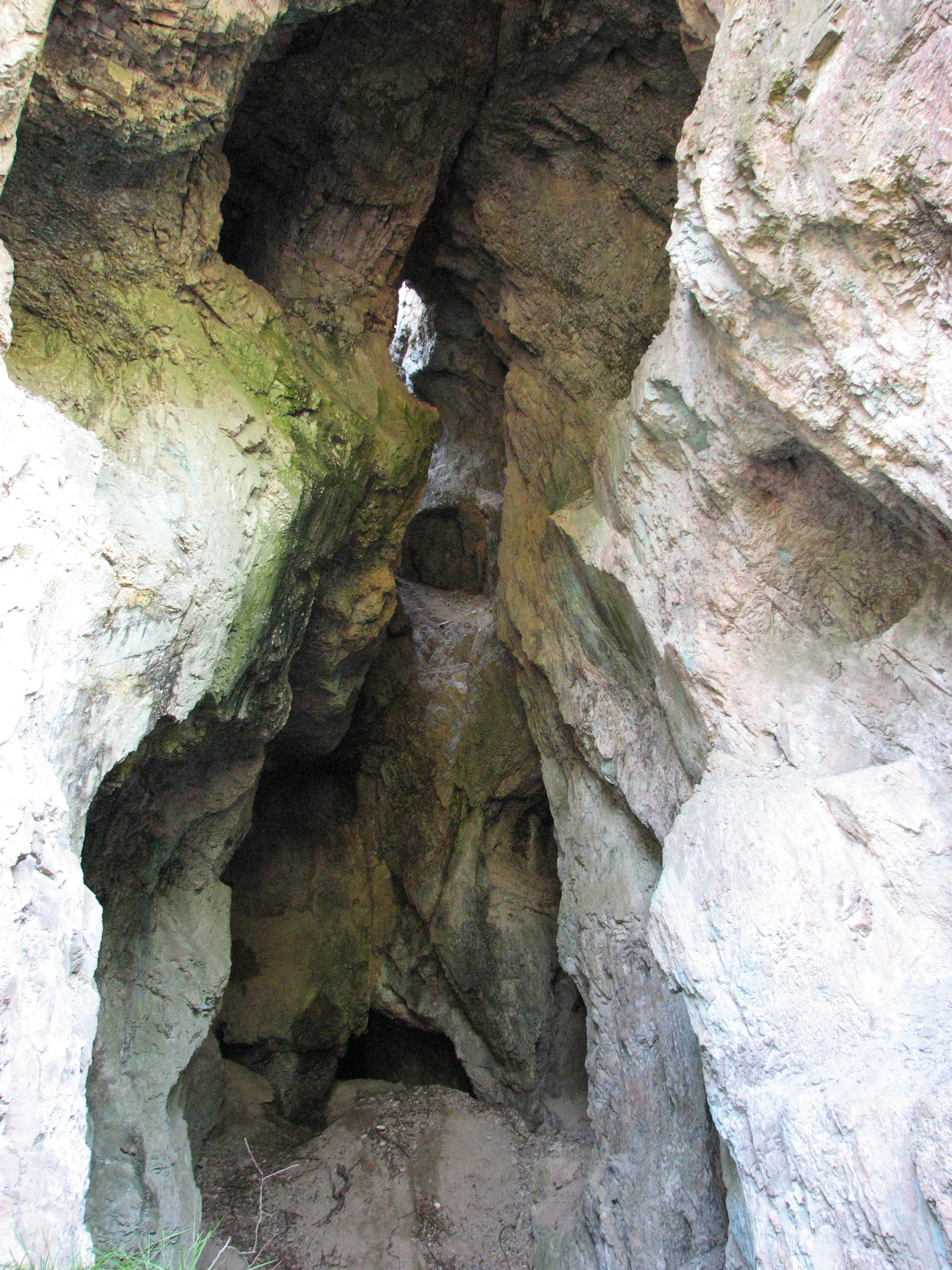
Weiße Grube, Imsbach

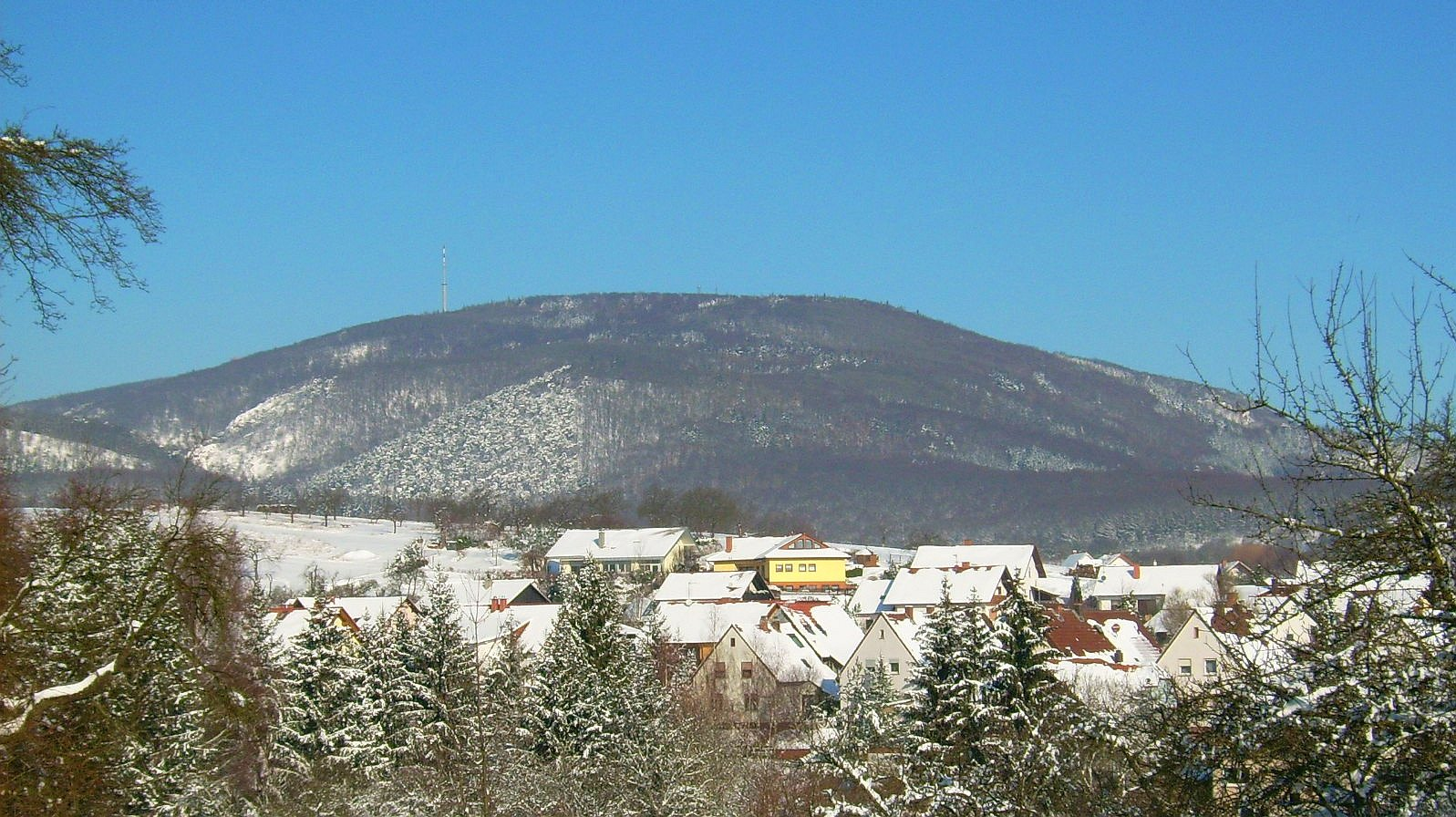
The Donnersberg

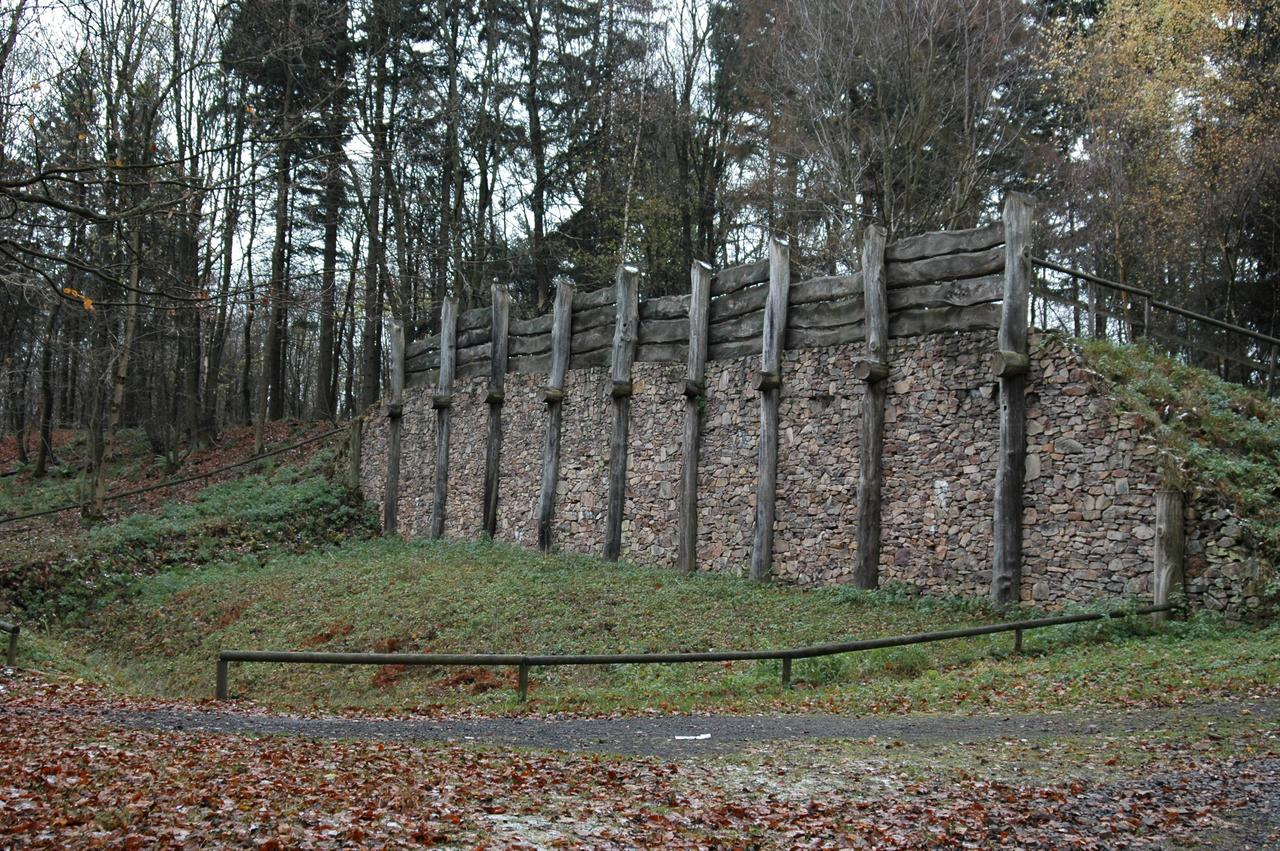
Celtic rampart on the Donnersberg

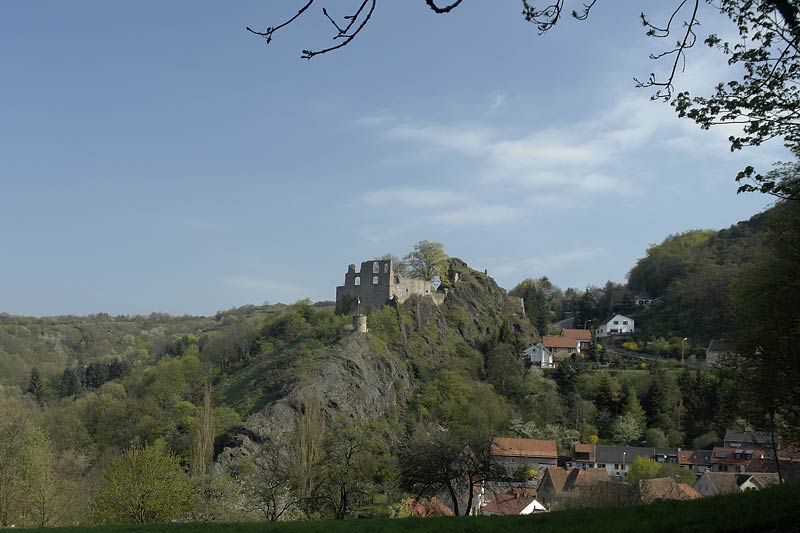
Falkenstein Castle on the Donnersberg

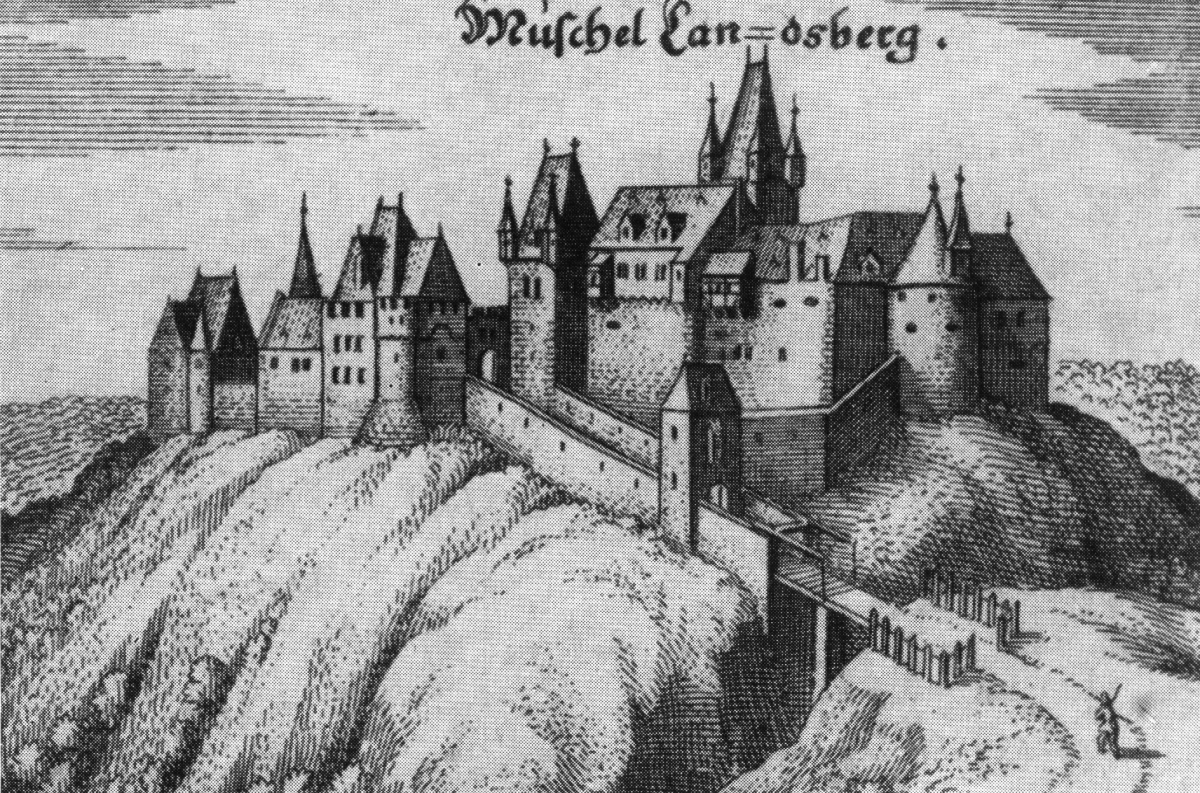
"Moschelland Castle" in the 17th century

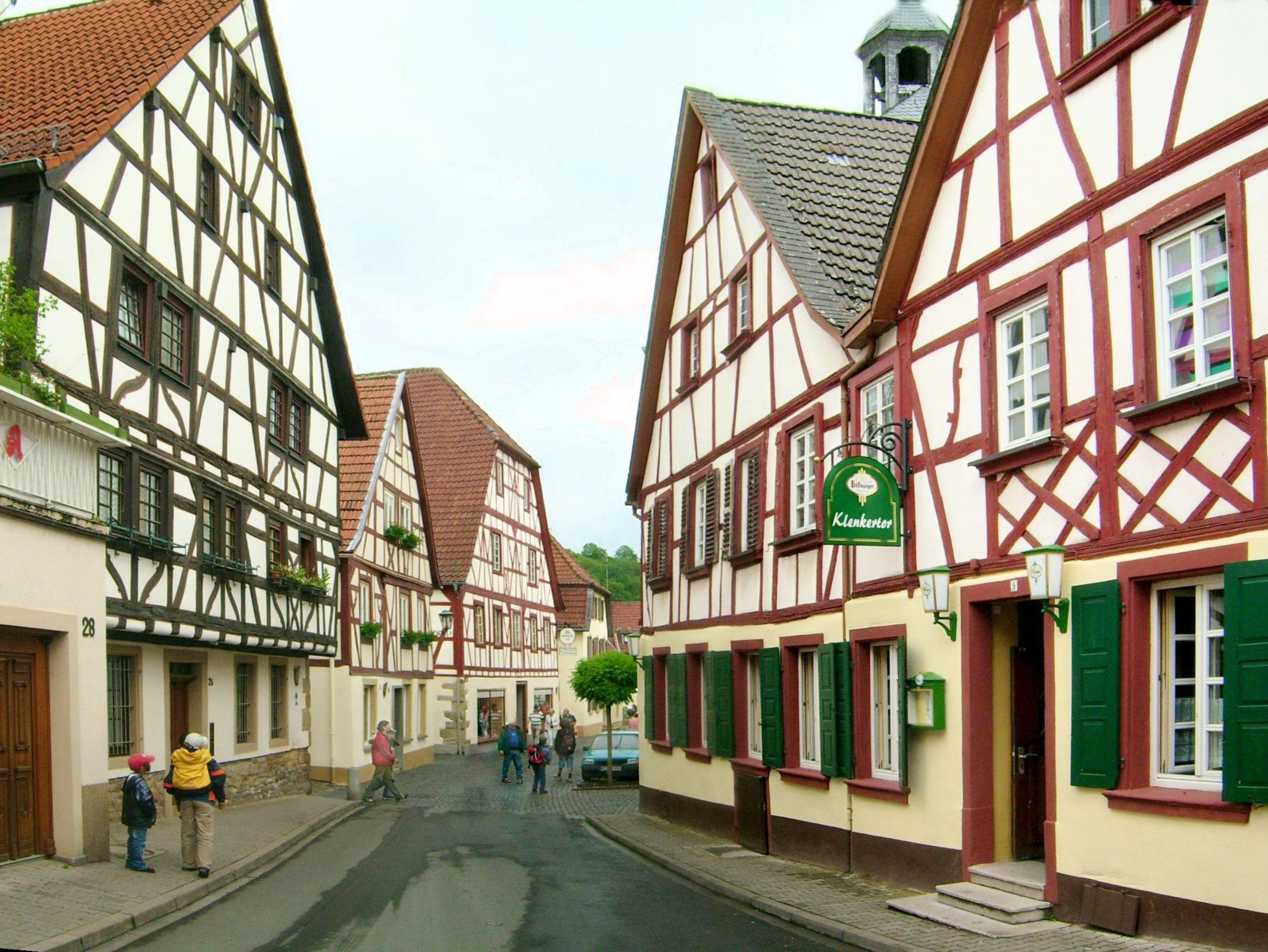
Meisenheim’s historic old town

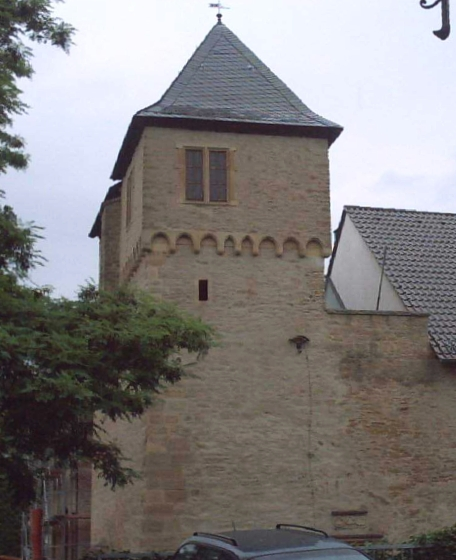
Schloss Lauterecken

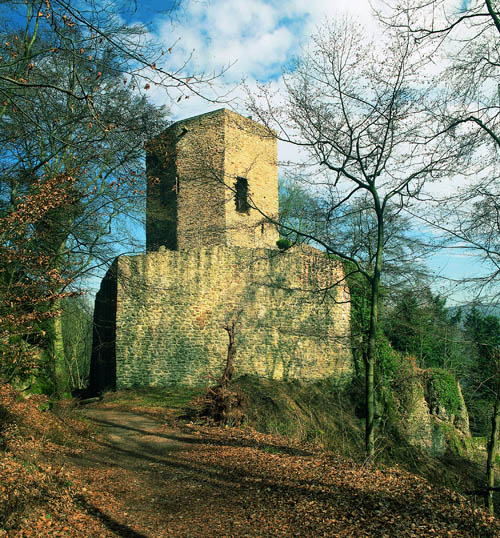
Alt-Wolfstein Castle near Wolfstein

Some of the stations and sights are managed comprehensively by various interest groups.

- Winnweiler

Chapel of the Cross

- Imsbach

Weiße Grube visitor mine

- Dannenfels
- Bastenhaus
- Donnersberg summit

Keltenwall, Ludwigsturm and Donnersberg Transmitter
Ring of castles around the massif: Falkenstein Tannenfels, Wildenstein, Hohenfels und Ruppertsecken

- Rockenhausen

Turmuhren Museum

- Obermoschel

Ruins of "Moschelland Castle"

- Meisenheim

Historic Altstadt

- Lauterecken

Schloss Lauterecken

- Wolfstein

Castles of Alt-Wolfstein and Neu-Wolfstein

== Literature ==
- "Wander-Auftakt mit Prädikat", Die Rheinpfalz, LEO Saison "Frühling" (in German), Ludwigshafen, pp. 8–11, April 2011
- Pfälzer Weitwanderwege: Pfälzer Weinsteig – Pfälzer Waldpfad – Pfälzer Höhenweg, Rother Wanderführer (in German) (2nd ed.), Oberhaching: Bergverlag Rother, 2016, ISBN 978-3-7633-4401-7
