= Königsberg (North Palatine Uplands) =

Hill in Rhineland-Palatinate, Germany

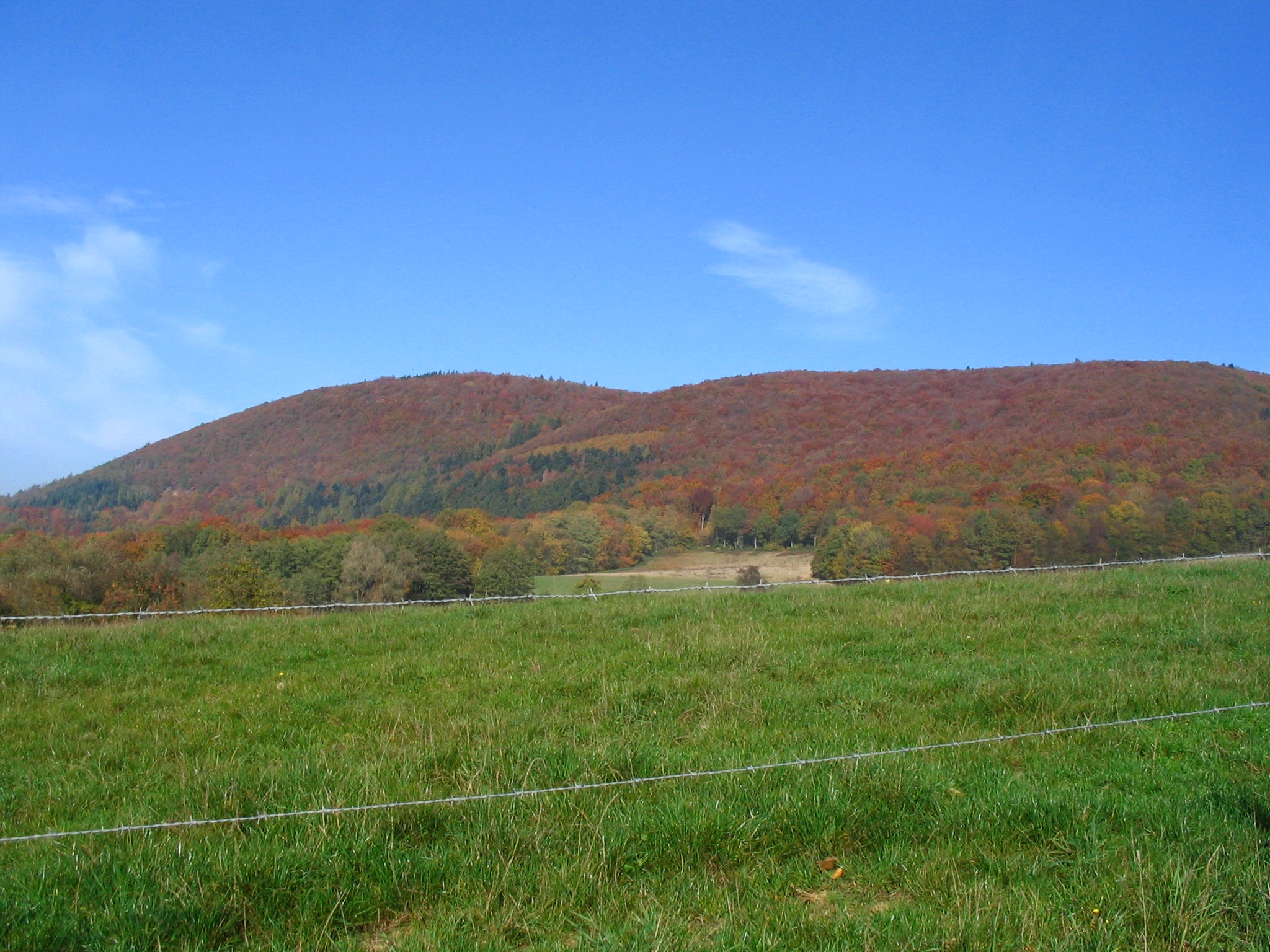
- The Königsberg in the autumn

Highest point
- Elevation: 568 m above sea level (NN) (1,864 ft)
- Coordinates: 49°34′43″N 07°35′0″E

Geography
- Location within Rhineland-Palatinate
- Location: Verbandsgemeinde Lauterecken-Wolfstein, Kusel, Rhineland-Palatinate
- Parent range: North Palatine Uplands

The Königsberg is a 568-metre-high hill in the collective municipality of Lauterecken-Wolfstein in the county of Kusel in the German state of Rhineland-Palatinate.

== Geography ==
The Königsberg lies between the Lauter and Talbach streams and is part of the North Palatine Uplands. It is one of the highest hills in the county of Kusel.

The Konigsberg massif measures about 5 kilometres from north to south and about 4 kilometres from east to west. Its two main summits are the Leienberg (524 m) and Hahnenkopf (535 m). To the south is the 546-metre-high Selberg.

The nearest villages are Wolfstein, Reckweilerhof, Aschbach, Hinzweiler, Oberweiler im Tal, Eßweiler and Rutsweiler an der Lauter.

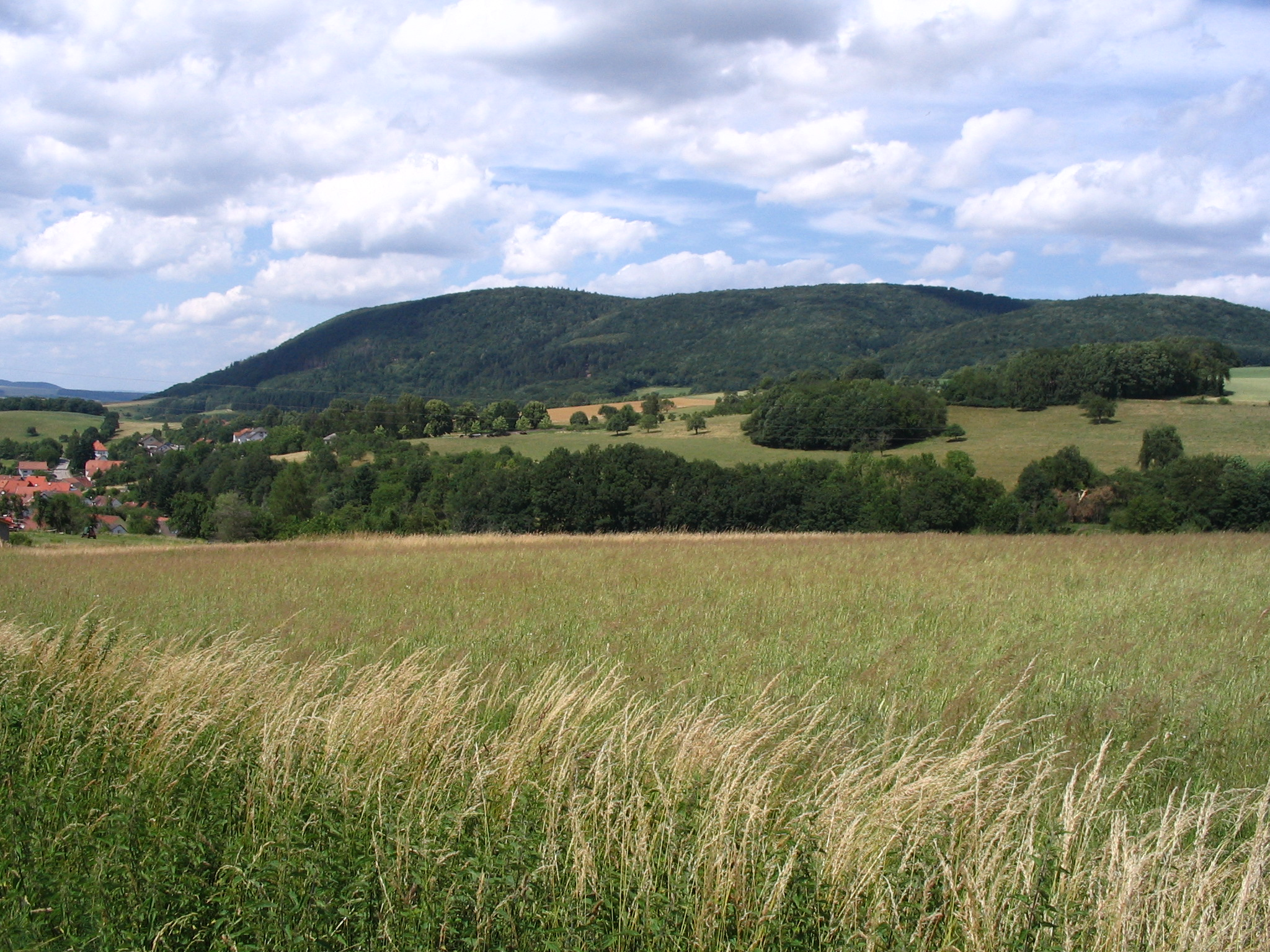
The Königsberg

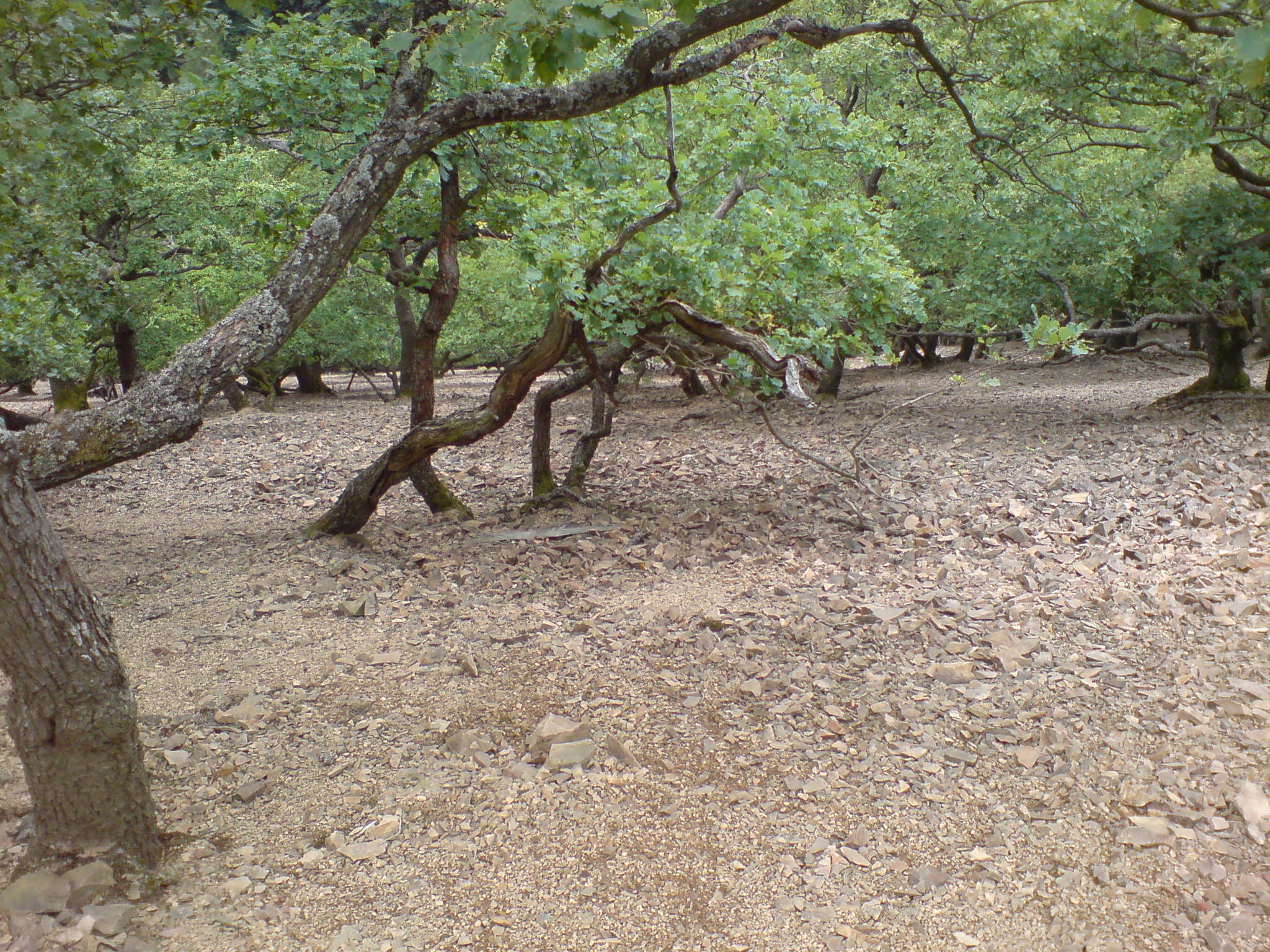
Bizarre tree landscape on the Leienberg

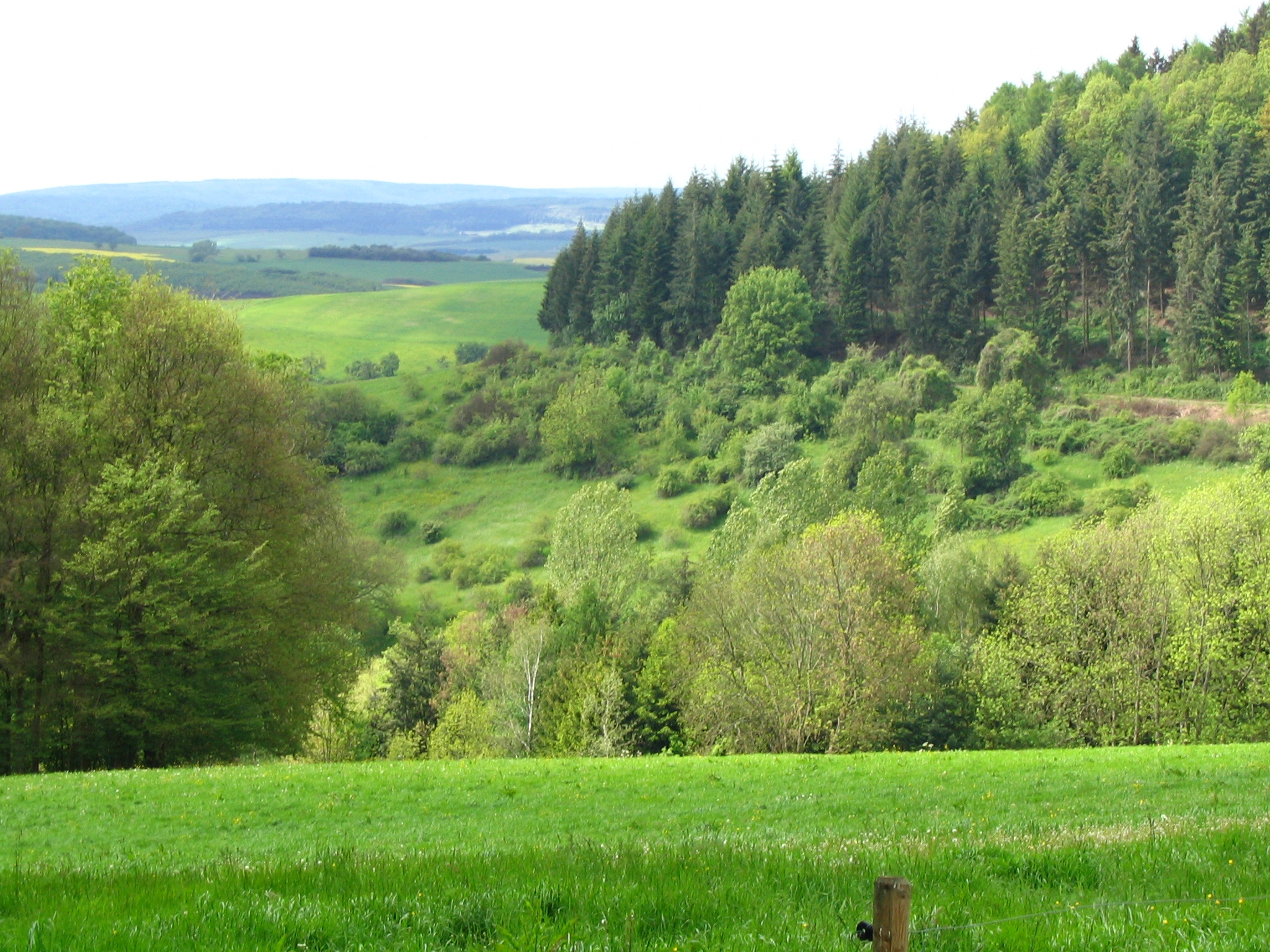
The western hillside of the Königsberg

== Flora and Fauna ==
The summit of the Konigsberg is almost entirely wooded; only on the lower slopes, especially in the west between Eßweiler and Oberweiler in the valley and in the northwest between Hinzweiler and Aschbach, are large areas turned over to agriculture. In Wolfstein, on a southern hillside below the castle of New Wolfstein, wine is grown.

The woods are predominantly a mix of beech and oak, individual areas are covered in spruce. One unusual feature may be seen on the Leienberg: the hillside above the Taufenbach valley is almost entirely covered in scree. Apart from individual bushes, only crooked oak and pine trees grow, barely higher than a man.

Due to the very varied landscape around the Konigsberg, there is a rich variety of fauna. Among the larger mammals are wild boar, roe deer, red fox and badger. Some time ago, mouflon lived here. There are sightings and clues of wildcats, but they are no longer clearly identifiable as resident.

In the area around the Konigsberg are the usual, native birds, but they are not obviously limited by the boundaries of the Konigsberg region. The black woodpecker is resident in the Königsberg. There are indications of Eurasian eagle-owl, but they are not definitive. Along the Talbach stream live kingfishers and grey herons; the red kite is also seen here

The Königsberg is designated as a Special Area of Conservation (SAC No. 6411-302, area 1,047 ha).

== Leisure options and sights ==
There is a multitude of tracks in the Königsberg that are suitable for walking. That said, the routes are not straightforward, because the ascent from the valleys is very steep. There is a view of Wolfstein at the Dreimärker which stands almost 300 metres above the village and close to the summit of the Königsberg. There are several chalets on the Königsberg, some of which are managed by local hiking clubs:

- The Hinzweiler Hut, by a pond in the Taufen valley between Königsberg and Leienberg. Managed in summer on Sundays and public holidays.
- The Laufhauser Weiher (pond) with its barbecue hut.
- The CJVM Hut, also a barbecue hut.
- The Rutsweiler Hut of the Palatine Forest Club, managed on Sundays.
- The hut of the Eßweiler Local History and Transport Society (Heimat- und Verkehrsverein Eßweiler), managed on Sundays.

In addition there are simple refuge huts along the trails.

In 2010 the Palatine Ridgeway opened, running from Winnweiler over the Donnersberg and the Königsberg to Wolfstein. Parts of the old West Palatinate Way ran through the Königsberg.

By the youth hostel above Wolfstein begins the Nordic Walking trail of Königsland: 3 waymarked routes run over the Königsberg and Selberg. On the saddle between the Konigsberg and Selberg lies the airfield of the Luftsportvereins Eßweiler.

=== Sights ===
There are 3 castles on the Königsberg: in the west, on a spur above the Talbach, lie the ruins of the Sprengelburg. On the eastern hillside above the town of Wolfstein are the two castles of Old Wolfstein and New Wolfstein. Between Rutsweiler on the Lauter and Wolfstein stands the double church, the last remains of an abandoned village. In Wolfstein lies the entrance to the Kalkbergwerk am Königsberg. At the summit near the Kreuzfeld are the remains of the Schwerspat Mine.

== History ==
A Roman road once ran over the heights of the Konigsberg from the area of Kaiserslautern to Lauterecken.
