= Alsenbrück-Langmeil =

- Borough of Winnweiler
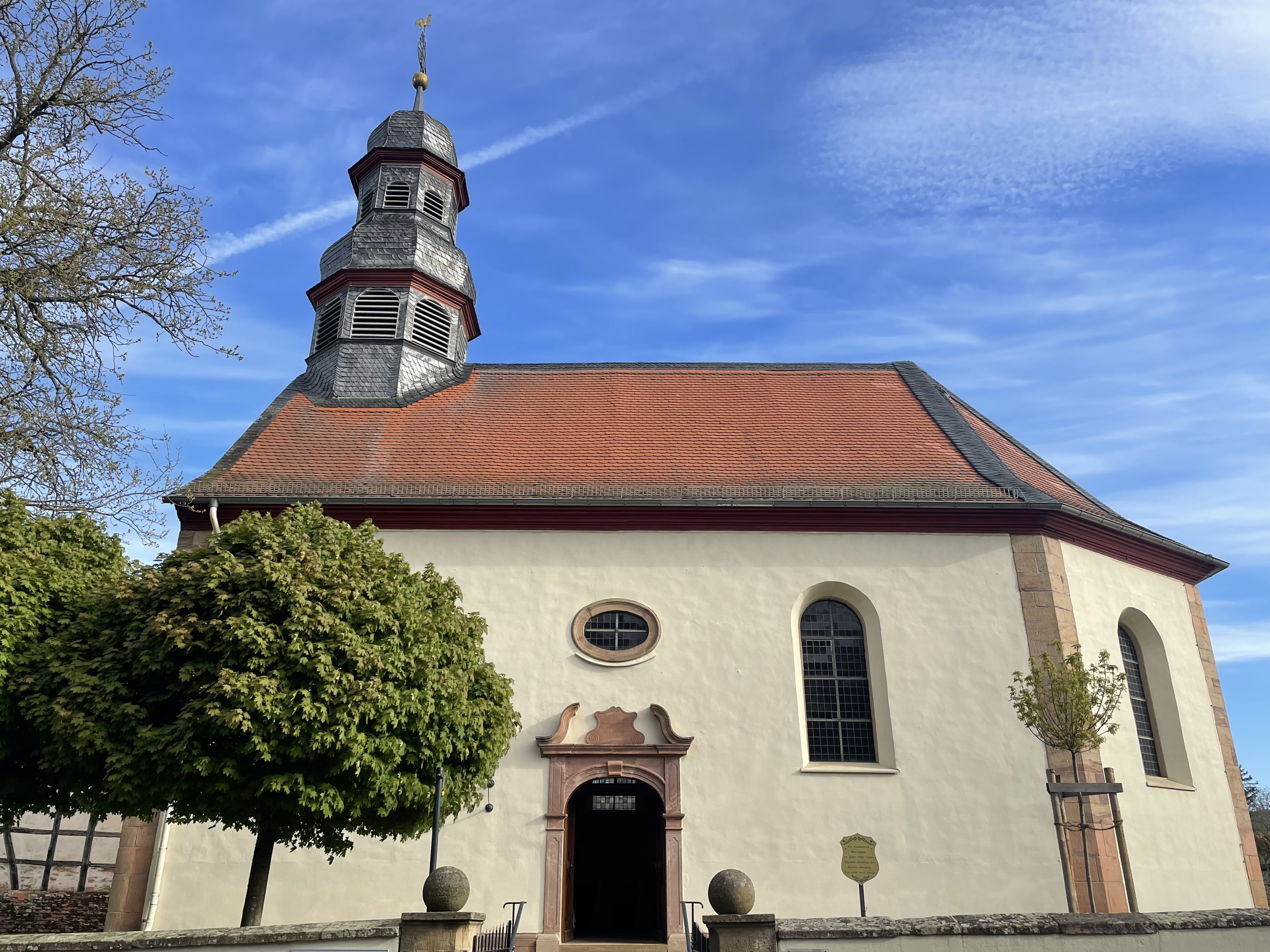
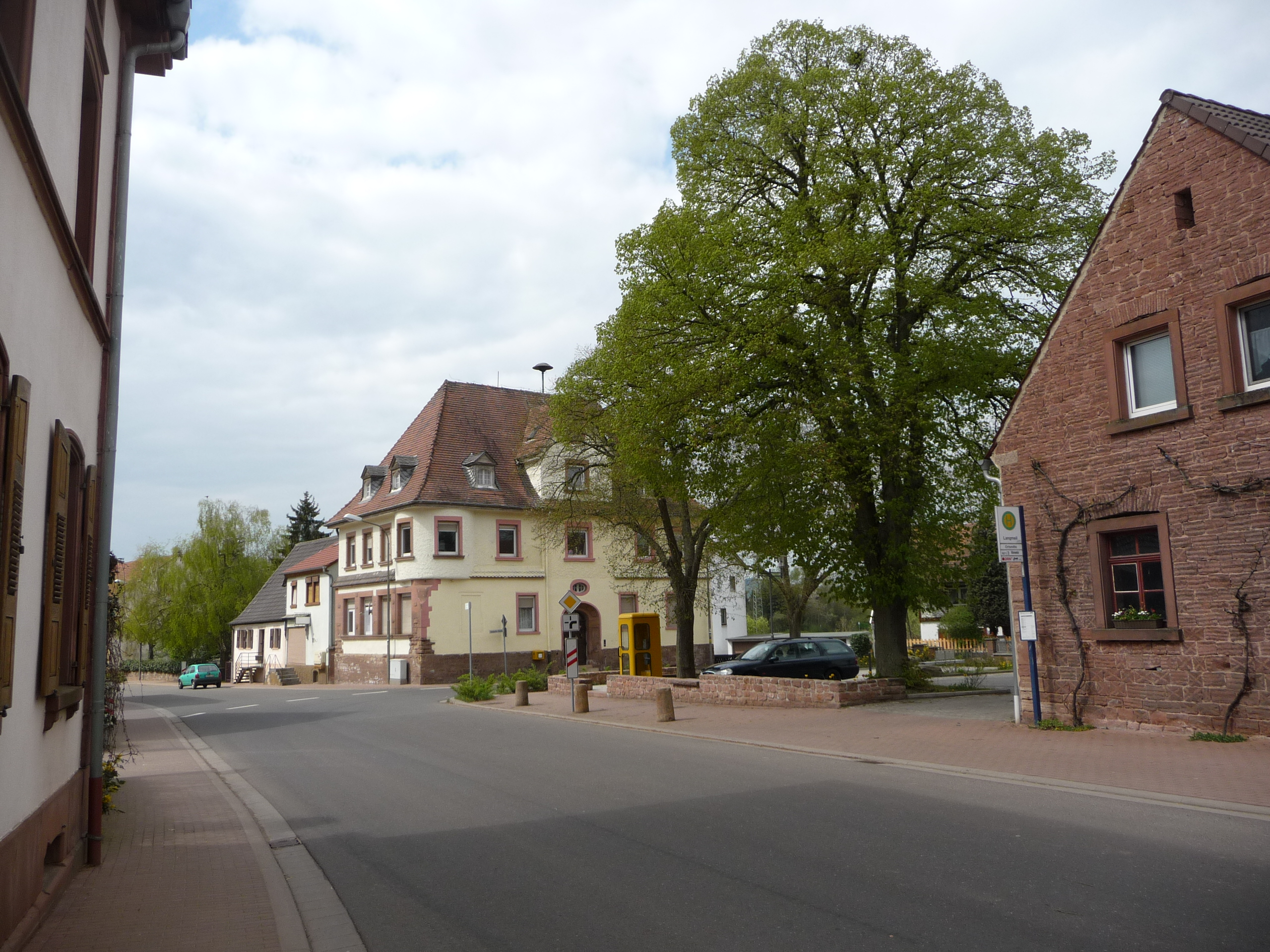
- protestant church in Alsenbrück center of Langmeil Langmeil

- Coat of arms
- Interactive map of Alsenbrück-Langmeil
- Location within Germany Location within Rhineland-Palatinate
- Coordinates: 49°33′54″N 7°52′55″E
- Country: Germany
- State: Rhineland-Palatinate
- District: Donnersbergkreis
- Town: Winnweiler

Government
  - Mayor: Winfried Matheis
- Elevation: 244 m (801 ft)

Population (2007)
  - Total: 747
- Time zone: UTC+01:00 (CET)
  - Summer (DST): UTC+02:00 (CEST)
- Postal codes: 67722
- Dialling codes: 06302

Alsenbrück-Langmeil (called Alsenbrück until 1880) is a borough of Winnweiler in the Donnersbergkreis district, in Rhineland-Palatinate, Germany. It was incorporated into the municipality on 10th June 1979.

== Geography ==
The borough is situated southeast of the North Palatine Uplands and north of the Palatine Forest. It consists of two villages which are separated by the Alsenz river.

At the border with Sippersfeld and Börrstadt the Bocksrück, the northern most hill of the Palatine Forest is located.

Besides the two villages the borough includes the settlements of Bahnhof Langmeil (former train station), Salomonsmühle, Sattelhof, Wäschbacherhof and Ziegelhütte.
