= Selberg (Kusel) =

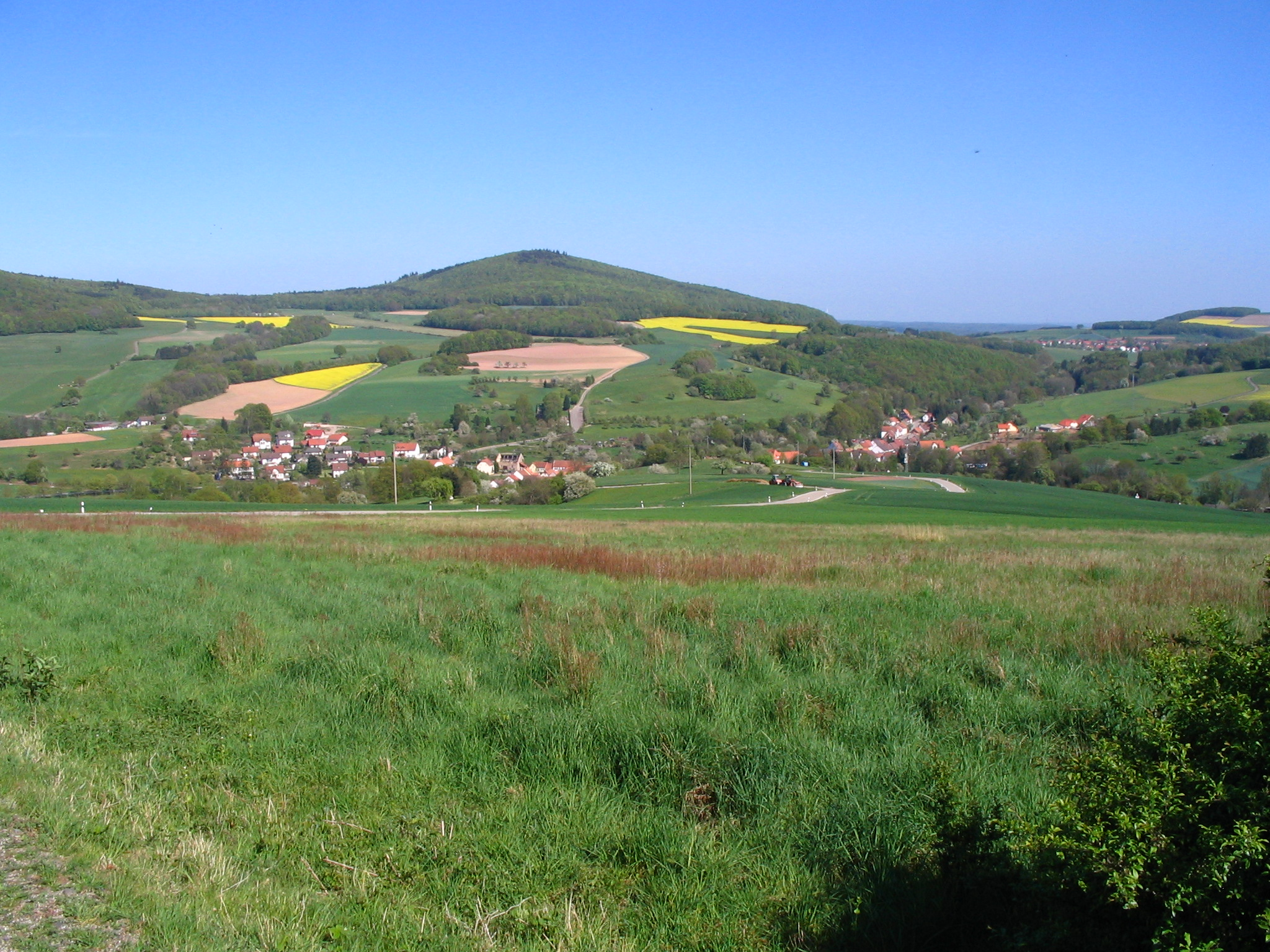
- The Selberg from the NW

Highest point
- Elevation: 545.1 m above sea level (NHN) (1,788 ft)
- Listing: Selberg Tower (viewing tower) and hut of the Selberg Club at the top
- Coordinates: 49°33′39″N 07°35′43″E

Geography
- Location within Rhineland-Palatinate
- Location: Kusel, Rhineland-Palatinate
- Parent range: North Palatine Uplands

The Selberg is a hill, 545.1 m, in the district of Kusel in the German state of Rhineland-Palatinate. It is part of the North Palatine Uplands and is a southern outlier of the Königsberg. The Selberg rises between the streams of Breitenbach and Lauter. Nearby villages are Eßweiler, Rutsweiler an der Lauter and Rothselberg.

== Selberg Tower and hut ==
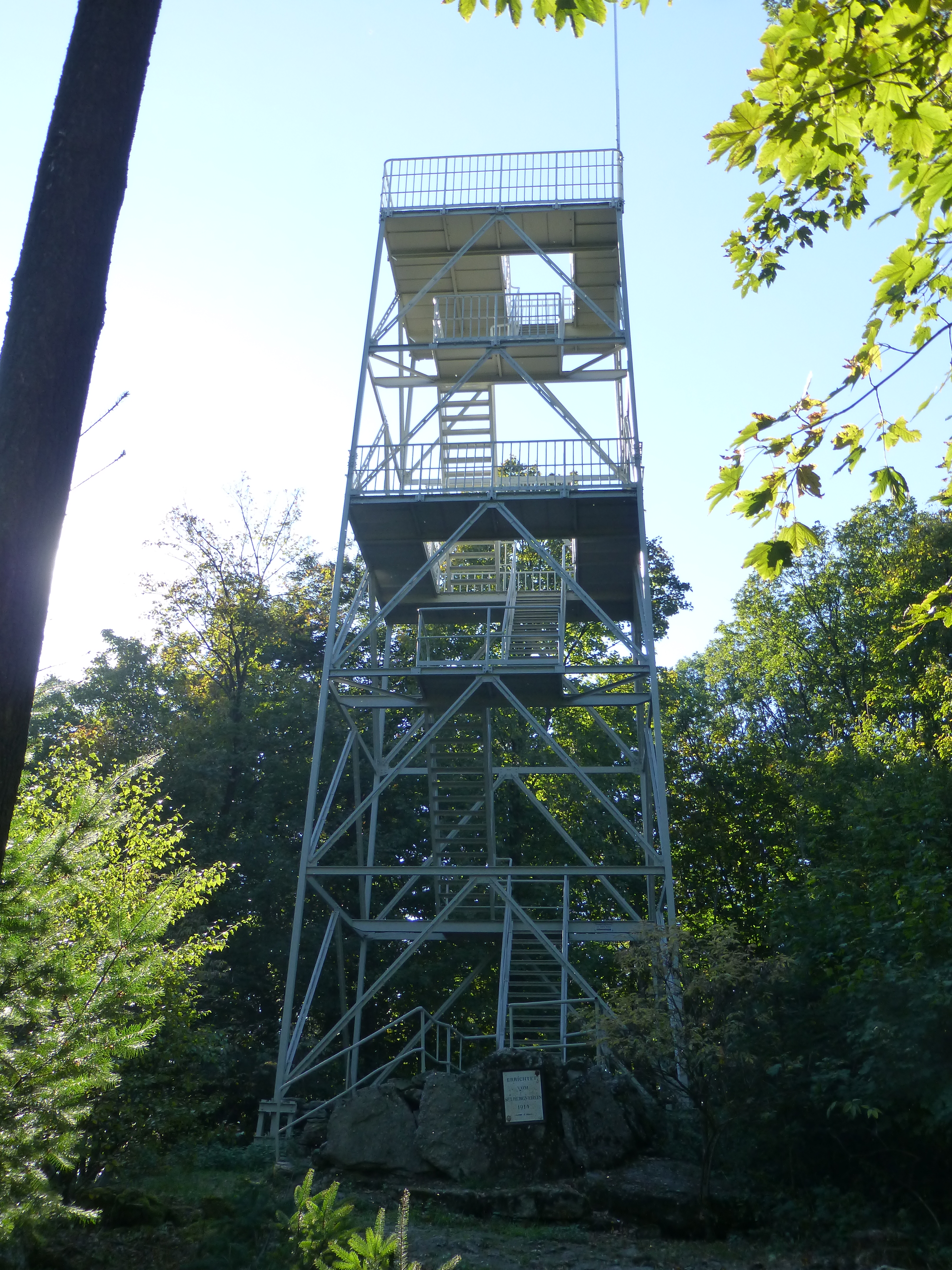
The Selberg Tower near Rothselberg

In 1914 the Selberg Club from Rothselberg erected a wooden viewing tower and log cabin on the summit. The wooden tower was replaced in 1969 by a 17.3-metre-high steel tower. Forty eight steps lead via two landings to a platform, 9.6 metres above ground level, and another 32 steps to a viewing platform at a height of 16 metres, from which there is a good panoramic view. The Selber Hut has been converted and expanded several times; it is open on Sundays.

== Transport and hiking ==
Several footpaths run around the Selberg, including a section of the Nordic walking course, Königsland. On the saddle between the Konigsberg and Selberg is a glider airfield belonging to the Eßweiler Aerial Sports Club.

== Archaeological finds ==
In the early 20th century, a 2nd-century Roman villa, the foundation of a tomb and other traces of settlement were found on the western hillside of the Selberg between Eßweiler and Rothselberg in the valley of the Breitenbach. Several Stone Age relics were discovered too, including a lance tip made of flint.
