= Potzberg =

Mountain in Germany

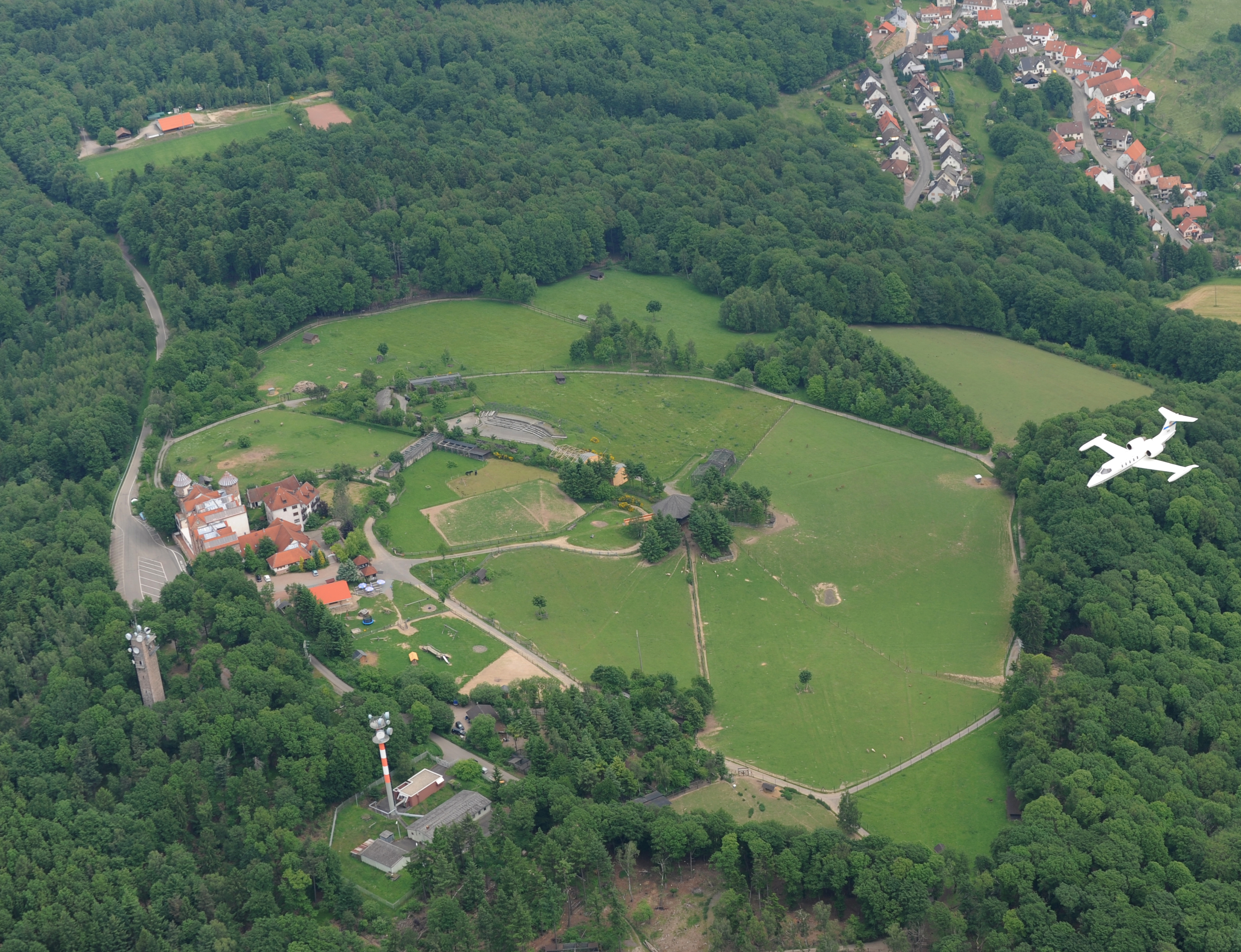
- The Potzberg with its postal and viewing tower, the Bundeswehr Tower, Burg (hotel), wildlife park and (upper right) the village of Föckelberg

Highest point
- Elevation: 562 m above sea level (NHN) (1,844 ft)
- Listing: Potzberg Wildlife Park and viewing tower
- Coordinates: 49°31′14″N 7°28′49″E

Geography
- Location within Rhineland-Palatinate
- Location: West Palatinate (Germany)
- Parent range: North Palatine Uplands

The Potzberg (German pronunciation: [ˈpɔtsbɛʁk]), known as "King of the Westrich" (König des Westrich), is a wooded hill, 562 m above sea level (NHN) (1,844 ft), in the North Palatine Uplands in the German state of Rhineland-Palatinate.

== Geography & history ==
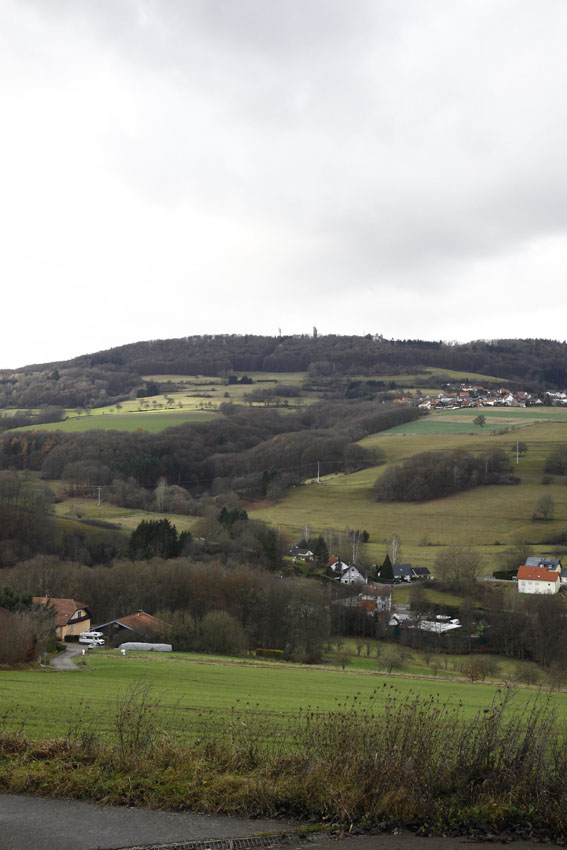
Potzberg summit

The Potzberg is one of the "Palatine Domes" (Pfälzer Kuppeln) and is located in the western part of the Northern Palatine Uplands in the county of Kusel. Not only its relative height, but also its massive appearance make the hill a conspicuous high point in West Palatinate. Although the Stolzberg (572 m [1,877 ft]) and Königsberg (567 m [1,860 ft]) are somewhat higher, the Potzberg has been given the epithet of "King of the Westrich", the name of the local region.

In 1964/65, the road was extended up to top of the Potzberg. Its summit belongs to the municipality of Föckelberg and is home to the Potzberg Wildlife Park, Potzberg Tower, a Bundeswehr military tower and a hotel.

Potzberg was a mining centre in the Palatinate in the 18th and 19th centuries. From the first decades of the 18th century until 1866, mining for the mercury mineral cinnabar was evidently carried out at Potzberg. The mining district in this second Palatine mining period mainly covered the municipalities of Gimsbach, Rutsweiler, Mühlbach and Föckelberg. The government of the Electorate of the Palatinate promised itself new sources of income with the production of mercury. This began on the southern Potzberg ("Alter Potzberg"), but from 1771 the focus shifted to the much richer northern Potzberg. Its zenith was probably in the 1780s. An old mining map by Electoral Palatine master miner (Bergmeister), Adolph E. Ludolph, dates to this time The names of the mine bear witness to the Christian faith of the miners. Numerous test pits, prospecting tunnels and other prospecting marks indicate this period of the mining boom. Unfortunately, however, many projects were unsuccessful and closed down after a short period. Very few mines were able to survive for any length of time and operate more or less profitably. After its expectant beginning and years of hope, mining gradually declined on the Potzberg. In 1795, there were only five mines still in operation; in 1850 only three mines were left, and, in 1866, mining ended at the Dreikönigszug ("Epiphany Shaft"). The Dreikönigszug, which had been in operation for almost nine decades, was one of the most profitable mercury mines in the Palatinate and Germany. Even today, numerous surface remnants in the Potzberg forest such as portals (Mundlöcher), collapsed tunnels (pingen), spoil tips, the gallery spring (Stollen Quelle, "Yellow Water") as well as the former mining administrator's house in the miners' settlement of Dreikönigszug and the housing estate of Kellerhäuschen are still reminiscent of the history of mining on the Potzberg.

== Sights ==
=== Potzberg Tower ===
The present Potzberg Tower, which has several predecessors, was built in only 39 working days. The foundation stone was laid on 13 October 1951, on 2 December 1951 the last stone on the 35-metre-high structure was cemented into placed. After the construction of 165 wooden steps and a pedestal to the platform of the tower, it was opened on 13 July 1952 with about 3,000 guests present. Originally an 18.5-metre-high broadcasting aerial was erected on the platform. From here, Südwestfunk broadcast its radio programmes until 30 November 1993 and the then private radio station RPR1 until 24 March 1993. Due to the dilapidation of the tower, however, the transmission antenna was dismantled. Its successor is the telecommunication tower on the Bornberg (520 m) at Schneeweiderhof near Eßweiler; it is used today by Südwestrundfunk.

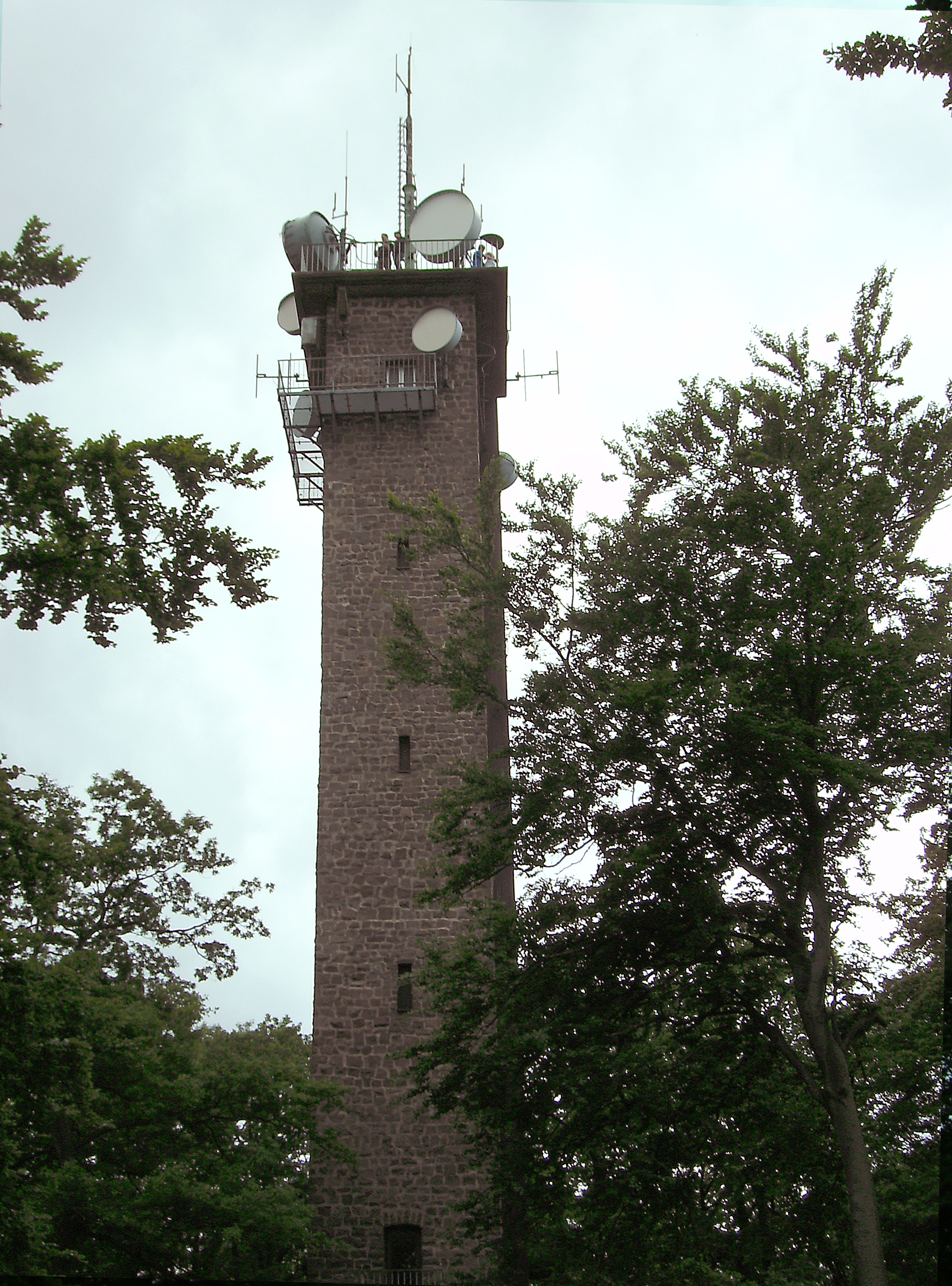
Potzberg Tower

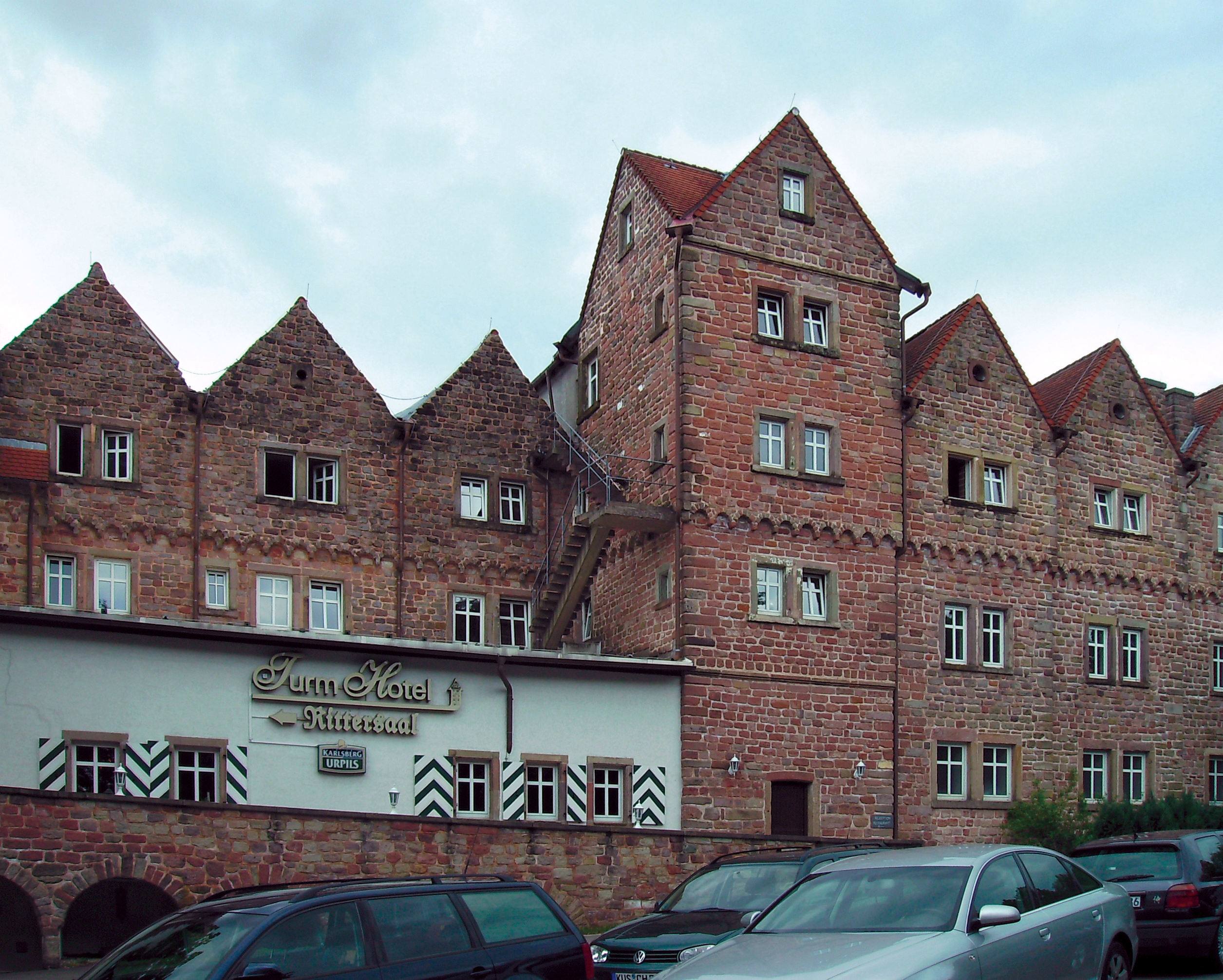
Burg hotel (north view)

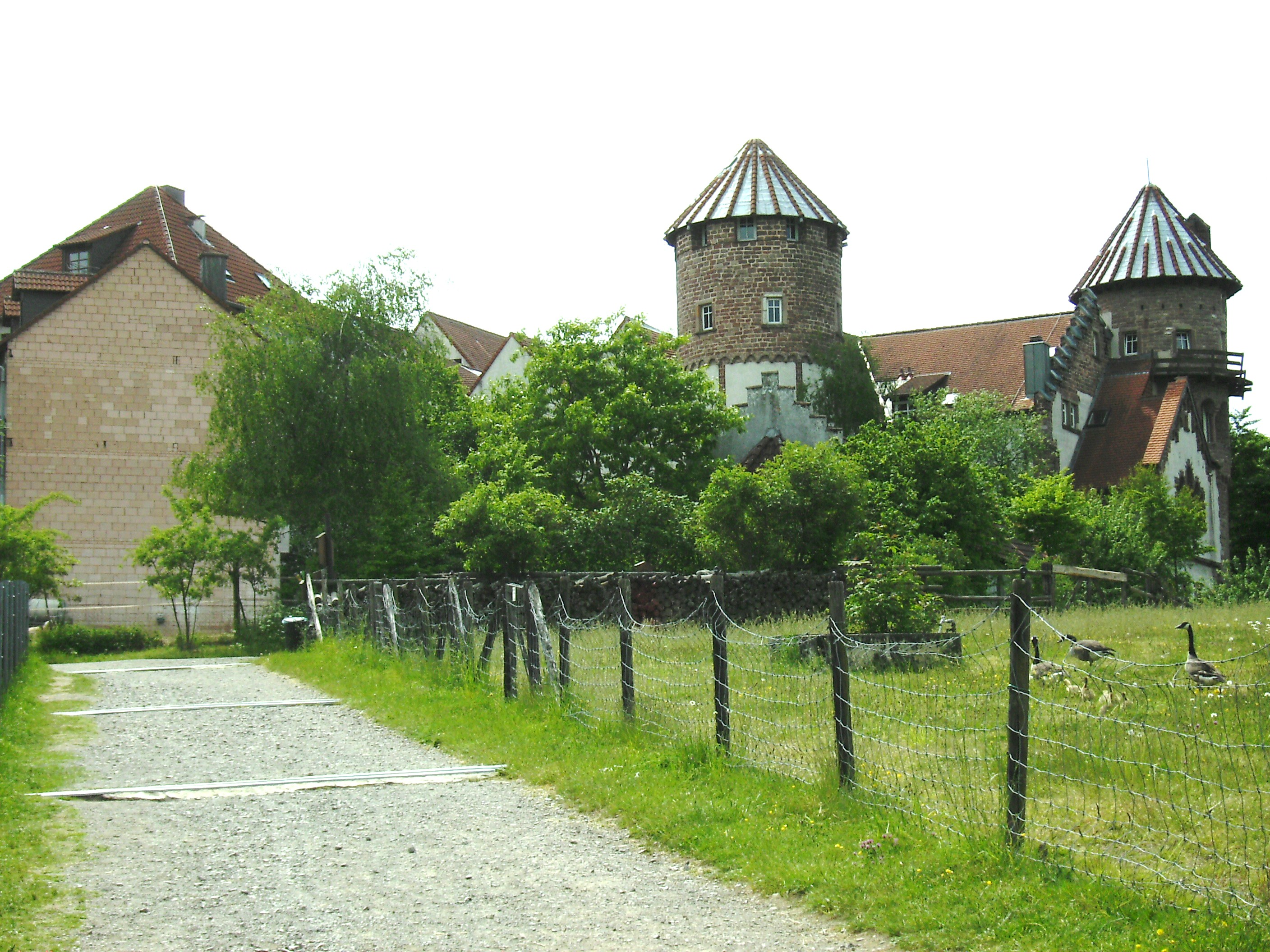
Burg (south view)

== Sport ==
The Potzberg Run (Potzberglauf) is 8,210 metres long and climbs through 342 metres in height. It takes place annually in November and is one of the Palatine Mountain Running Cup series.

Until 1997 there was an annual mountain race for touring cars from Mühlbach to the top of the Potzberg. It was 3.34 kilometres long.

== Literature ==
- Jan Fickert (2010), Rund um den Potzberg (in German), Erfurt: Sutton-Verlag, ISBN 978-3-86680-675-7
