= Winnweiler station =

Railway station in Winnweiler, Germany

Winnweiler
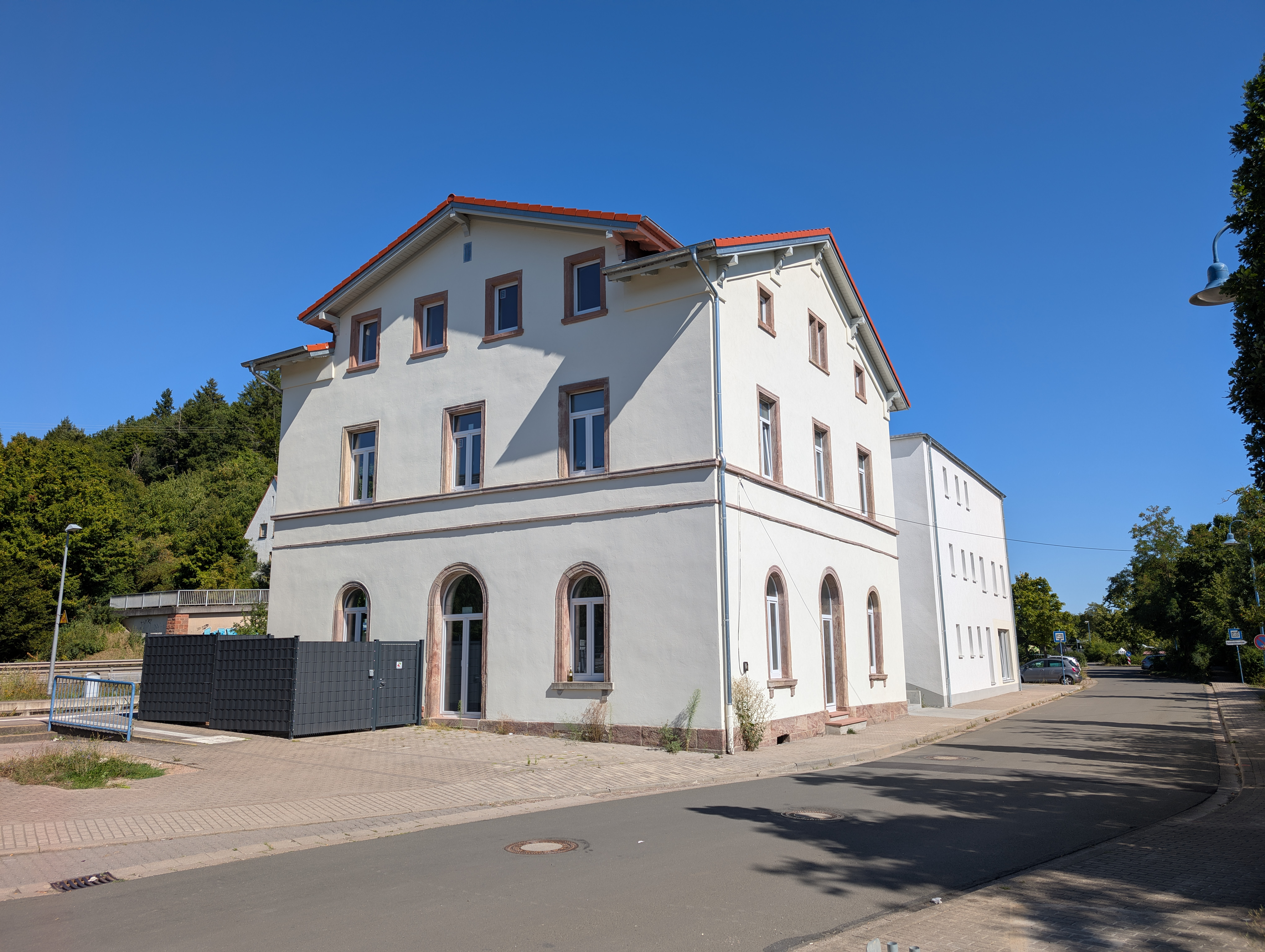
- Winnweiler station building

General information
- Location: Bahnhofstr. 1, Winnweiler, Rhineland-Palatinate; Germany
- Coordinates: 49°34′14″N 7°51′22″E
- Lines: Alsenz Valley Railway (km 16.84) (KBS 672)
- Platforms: 2 (previously 3)

Construction
- Accessible: Yes

Other information
- Station code: 6804
- DS100 code: SWNW
- IBNR: 8006483
- Category: 6
- Fare zone: VRN: 869
- Website: www.bahnhof.de

History
- Opened: 29 October 1870

Services
Preceding station	Vlexx	Following station
Enkenbach towards Kaiserslautern Hbf	RE 15	Rockenhausen towards Bodenheim
Rockenhausen towards Koblenz Hbf	RE 17	Kaiserslautern Hbf Terminus
Preceding station	DB Regio Mitte	Following station
Münchweiler (Alsenz) towards Kaiserslautern Hbf	RB 65	Imsweiler towards Bingen Hbf
Location

Winnweiler station is the station of the town of Winnweiler in the German state of Rhineland-Palatinate. Deutsche Bahn classifies it as a category 6 station and it has two platforms.

It is located on the Alsenz Valley Railway (Alsenztalbahn, Hochspeyer–Bad Münster) and was opened on 29 October 1870 with the first section from Hochspeyer to Winnweiler.

== Location ==
The station is located on the north-eastern edge of Winnweiler. There is a pedestrian level crossing at the station. In addition, a bridge crosses the station, connecting the B48 with the village centre.

== History ==
With the opening of the Hochspeyer–Winnweiler section of the Alsenz Valley Railway on 29 October 1870, Winnweiler was connected to the railway network. For about half a year, Winnweiler was the terminus of this line. On 16 May 1871, the line was extended to Bad Münster am Stein and thus completed. Since then, Winnweiler station has been a through station.

At the beginning of the twentieth century, the station had ticket gates like other stations in the Palatinate. During this time, the station was managed by the Betriebs- und Bauinspektion Kaiserslautern II (operations and construction inspectorate of Kaiserslautern II) and was part of the responsibility of the Bahnmeisterei Rockenhausen (office of the track master of Rockenhausen).

In 1922, the station was integrated into the new Reichsbahndirektion Ludwigshafen (railway division of Ludwigshafen). A year later, the railway workers employed at the railway station were expelled during the operation of the railway by the French military during the occupation of the Palatinate by France. During the dissolution of the railway division of Ludwigshafen, on 1 April 1937, it was transferred to the railway division of Mainz and the Betriebsamtes (RBA) Bad Kreuznach (operations office of Bad Kreuznach).

After the Second World War, the newly founded Deutsche Bundesbahn (DB) transferred the station to the Bundesbahndirektion Mainz (Bundesbahn railway division of Mainz), which was assigned all railway lines within the newly created state of Rhineland-Palatinate. As early as 1971, it became a part of the railway division of Saarbrücken with the dissolution of the railway division of Mainz. In 2000, the station, like all stations in the Western Palatinate, became part of the Westpfalz-Verkehrsverbund (Western Palatinate transport association, WVV) at its foundation, but the WVV was absorbed into the Verkehrsverbund Rhein-Neckar (Rhine-Neckar transport association, VRN) six years later. Since the abandonment of passenger operations at the neighbouring Langmeil (Pfalz) station, Winnweiler has been the only railway station within the municipality of Winnweiler that has passenger services.

At the beginning of March 2008, the upgrading of Winnweiler station to provide accessibility began. For total costs of €1,025,000, platform 1 was extended and the island with platforms 2 and 3 was replaced by an outside platform, platform 2. Since then, Winnweiler station has only had two instead of the previous three platforms. The conversion, which was originally intended to cost only €873,000, was completed in July 2008. The official inauguration of the new station took place on 10 September 2008.

== Infrastructure ==
The railway station is crossed by a bridge, which carries district route 4. It has a signal box containing a push-button relay interlocking without automatic course setting built by Siemens and designated as Wf. It used to be called Wnf.

Platforms
Platform	Usable length	Height	Current use
1	122 m	55 cm	Services towards Kaiserslautern
2	120 m	55 cm	Services towards Bad Kreuznach/Bingen/Mainz

== Operations ==
=== Passengers ===
Winnweiler station is one of the most important stations of the Alsenz Valley Railway. It is served by Regionalbahn services on line RB 65 on the route from Kaiserslautern Hbf via Bad Kreuznach to Bingen (Rhein) Hbf at hourly intervals and since December 2014 by Regional-Express services on line RE 15 between Kaiserslautern Hbf and Mainz Hbf (individual services).

Line	Route	Interval
RE 17	Koblenz – Boppard – Oberwesel – Bingen (Rhein) – Bad Kreuznach – Bad Münster am Stein – Rockenhausen – Winnweiler – Kaiserslautern	120 minutes
RB 65	Kaiserslautern – Enkenbach – Winnweiler – Rockenhausen – Alsenz – Bad Münster am Stein – Bad Kreuznach – Langenlonsheim – Bingen (Rhein)	60 minutes

Winnweiler station is served by regional bus routes.

=== Freight ===
In 1871 a pair of freight trains ran on the Kaiserslautern – Münster route. In addition, there was a "supplemental” pair of freight trains, which served only the larger stations between Kaiserslautern and Münster such as Winnweiler. The stop at Winnweiler station always took more than ten minutes. Towards the beginning of the twentieth century, freight trains on the Kaiserslautern – Bingerbrück and Kaiserslautern – Bad Münster routes served the station.
