= Old Wolfstein Castle =

Castle in Germany

- Altes Schloß
- Wolfstein
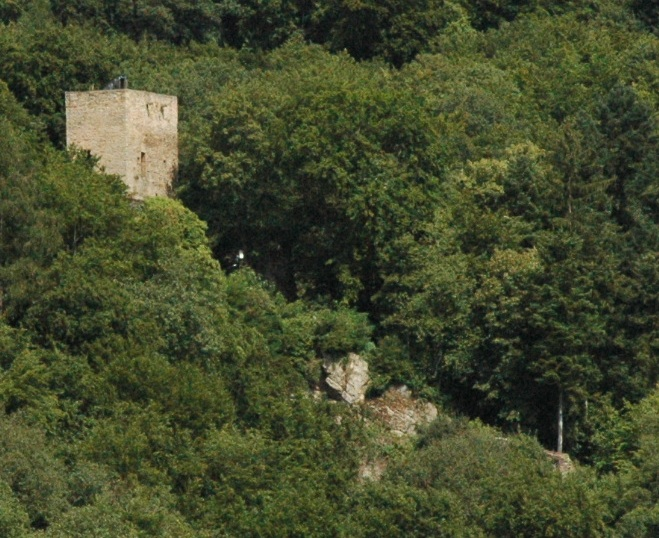
- Old Wolfstein seen from New Wolfstein

Site information
- Type: hill castle, hillside location
- Code: DE-RP
- Condition: ruin

Location
- Coordinates: 49°35′23.7″N 7°36′3.3″E

Site history
- Built: um 1160/70

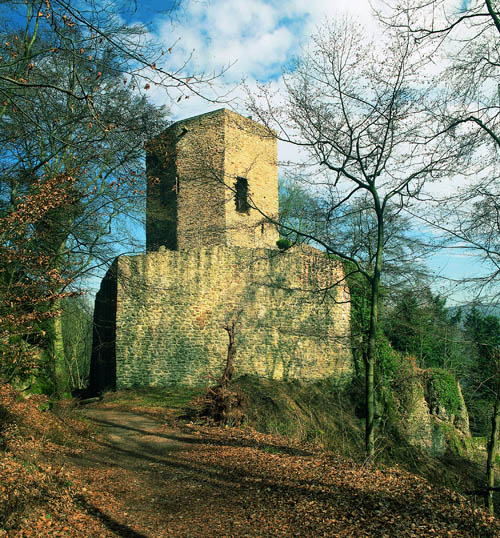
Alt-Wolfstein Castle

Old Wolfstein Castle (German: Burg Alt-Wolfstein, also called the Altes Schloß), is a ruined hillside castle on the eastern slopes of the Königsberg at the narrowest point in the Lauter valley near Wolfstein in the county of Kusel in the German state of Rhineland-Palatinate.

== History ==
Old Wolfstein was probably built under Emperor Frederick Barbarossa around 1160/70 to guard and administer the Imperial Estate around Kaiserslautern.

The castle is first recorded in 1275 as Woluistein. At that time it was occupied by imperial ministeriales.

In the 14th century the castle acted as security (Pfandobjekt), and, as an imperial pledge (Reichspfand), ended up in the possession of the counts of Sponheim and counts of Veldenz. Baldwin of Luxembourg made several unsuccessful attempts to acquire the castle through an imperial mortgage (Reichspfandschaft).

Repeated raids on the castle defenders, who came from Sponheim ministeriales families, led to armed conflicts. In 1362 the Bishop of Speyer occupied the castle; in 1400 the Archbishops of Mainz and Trier, the Duke of Lorraine and Count Palatine Rupert III besieged the castle. As a consequence, Electoral Palatinate received a quarter of the castle.

In the 15th and 16th centuries, Electoral Palatinate and the Duchy of Zweibrücken fought for possession of the castle. The dispute ended in 1504 with its destruction by Prince-Elector Philip of the Palatinate. After that, Old Wolfstein was allowed to fall into ruin.

In the 19th and 20th centuries the ruins came into the possession of the Kingdom of Bavaria and, since 1963, have been managed by the Castle Authorities of Rhineland-Palatinate (Schlösserverwaltung von Rheinland-Pfalz). The latter carried out safety work on the walls in the years 1979 to 1981 and 1985 to 1986. The remains of the castle ruins include a 20-metre-high bergfried.

== Site ==
From the platform of the pentangular bergfried there is a very good view of the surrounding area. The walls of the small cast are a well preserved example of High Hohenstaufen architecture. Another feature of this design is the elongated tip of the side of the bergfried facing the likely direction of attack. To the north of the ruins on a steep hillside is rubble from an old wall, which is evidence of the formerly, lower lying outer ward of the castle. From 1961 to 1975 remains of a castle residence (Burghaus), a gate tower and a water well were uncovered.

== Accident ==
A close observation of the interior wall of the ruined bergfried reveals at a certain height the handle and rear part of a trowel. This tool was probably embedded there by workmen in memory of a colleague who fell and was killed during restoration work. This trowel is supposed to have been worked into the wall at the exact height from which the man fell (the exact date must be before 1970, but cannot be more precisely estimated).

== Literature ==
- Jürgen Keddigkeit: Altenbolanden. In: Jürgen Keddigkeit, Alexander Thon, Karl Scherer, Rolf Übel (eds.): Pfälzisches Burgenlexikon. Vol. 1. Institut für Pfälzische Geschichte und Volkskunde, Kaiserslautern, 2003, ISBN 3-927754-18-8, (Beiträge zur pfälzischen Geschichte 12, 1), pp. 168–177.
- Alexander Thon (ed.): „Wie Schwalben Nester an den Felsen geklebt ...“. Burgen in der Nordpfalz. Schnell & Steiner. Regensburg, 2005, ISBN 3-7954-1674-4, pp. 166–169.
