= Schloss Lauterecken =

Cultural monument in Germany

Coordinates: 49°38′56″N 7°35′30″E

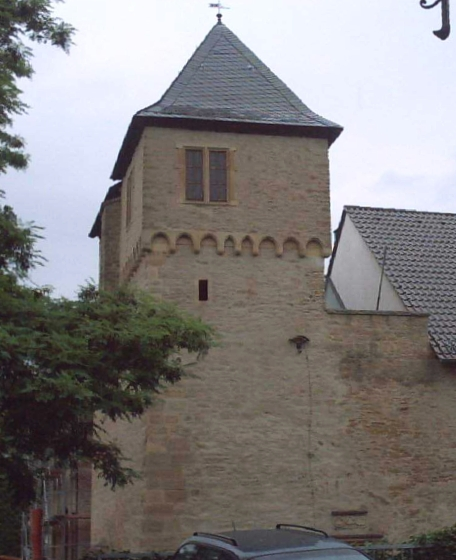
The Veldenz tower of the schloss

The Veldenz Schloss of Lauterecken (German: Veldenzschloss Lauterecken) stands in the little Palatine town of Lauterecken and is a cultural monument. It was once the residence of the counts of Palatinate-Veldenz, who lived for four generations that lasted for 151. The schloss is at Veldenzplatz 1. Since 2017 it has been converted and renovated internally in order to become a new 'jewel' for the town of Lauterecken.

== History ==
A Lauterecken Castle was built in the Middle Ages within the Verdun estate of Medard. Gerlach I (1112-1146), a descendant of the counts of Nahe, founded the County of Veldenz (named after the town on the Moselle). The blue Veldenz lion in the coat of arms of Lauterecken still recalls this family. The castle with its characteristic Veldenz tower was first mentioned in 1343. Around 1349, Veldenz received town rights. In 1444, the Wittelsbach Stephen, Count Palatine of Simmern-Zweibrücken, widower of Anna of Veldenz, inherited the County of Veldenz and of the Veldenz share of the County of Sponheim from his father-in-law, and formed the County Palatine of Zweibrücken. A century later (1532), the child Wolfgang, Count Palatine of Zweibrücken inherited the lands, and was cared for by his uncle and regent, Rupert. In 1543, when Wolfgang reached majority and took on the responsibility of office, he enacted the Marburg Contract, giving Rupert the County of Veldenz, including the Ämter (districts) of Veldenz and Lauterecken, as well as the Jettenbach jurisdiction and Remigsberg House.

As founder of the Palatinate-Veldenz line, Rupert Lauterecken raised Lauterecken to the status of a residence town and had a representative schloss built. His son, the "astute" and visionary George John I, Count Palatine of Veldenz, married the Swedish princess Anna Maria from the House of Vasa. He extended the county to include areas of Electoral Palatinate, and later moved his residence to the Alsatian town of Lützelstein (La Petite-Pierre) and founded Pfalzburg. When George John died in 1592, his state was divided between his sons George Gustavus and Leopold Louis, until the Protestant dynasty of the Palatinate-V Lauterecken finally came into existence in 1733 after many years of disputeKurpfalz. In the later Bavarian period, when Zweibrücken's house was on the Bavarian throne, the Veldenz lion was absorbed into the Bavarian coat of arms. The bones of 15 members of the House of Palatinate-Veldenz rest in the Provost's Church on the nearby Remigiusberg.
