= North Palatine Uplands =

Mountains in Germany

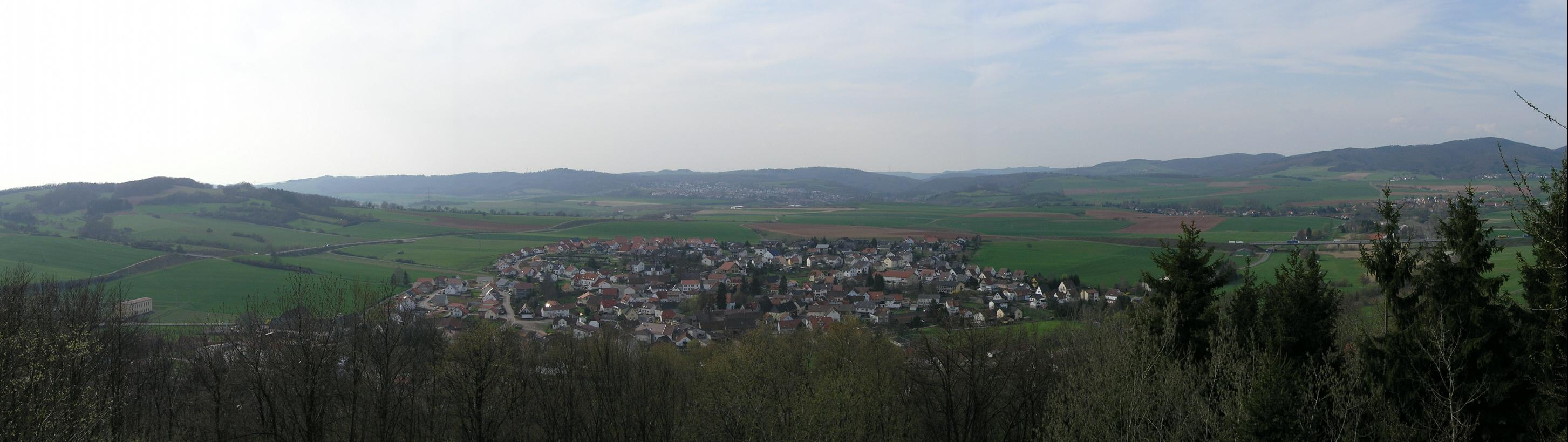
- The North Palatine Uplands around Münchweiler in Donnersbergkreis

Highest point
- Peak: Donnersberg
- Elevation: 686.5 m (2,252 ft)

Dimensions
- Length: 70 km (43 mi)

Geography
- State(s): Rhineland-Palatinate, Saarland
- Range coordinates: 49°35′0″N 7°40′0″E
- Parent range: North French Scarplands

Geology
- Orogeny: low mountains

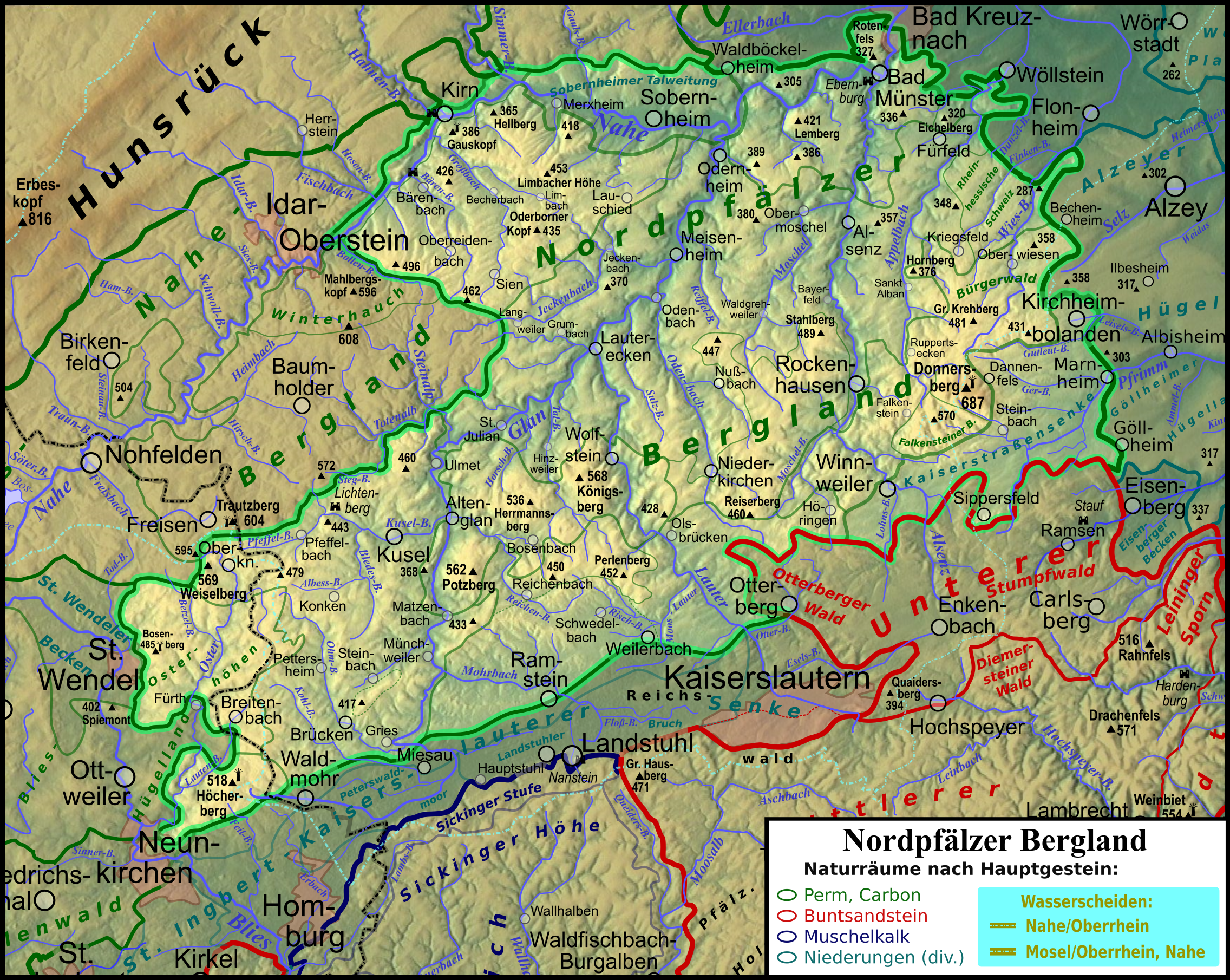
Natural regions of the North Palatine Uplands ("Nordpfälzer Bergland")

The North Palatine Uplands (German: Nordpfälzer Bergland, pronounced [ˈnɔʁtˌpfɛltsɐ ˈbɛʁkˌlant]), sometimes shortened to Palatine Uplands (Pfälzer Bergland), is a low mountain range and landscape unit in the German state of Rhineland-Palatinate and belongs mainly to the Palatinate region. It is part of the Saar-Nahe Uplands.

== Geography ==
=== Location ===
The North Palatine Uplands lie – roughly stated – between St. Wendel in the state of Saarland to the west and three towns belonging to Rhineland-Palatinate: Alzey to the east, Kaiserslautern to the south and Bad Kreuznach to the north, although these towns are not actually within the region itself. The North Palatine Uplands thus links the landscapes of the Palatine Forest, Saar-Hunsrück Nature Park, Naheland and Rheinhessen.

To the northwest its boundary with Naheland is not always clear. A rough guide is the heavily folded ridge north of the Glan river with a height different of as much as 300 metres in place.

The North Palatine Uplands fall mainly within the districts of Kusel and Donnersbergkreis. To a lesser extent it also falls within parts of Kaiserslautern, St. Wendel, Birkenfeld and Bad Kreuznach.

=== Hills ===
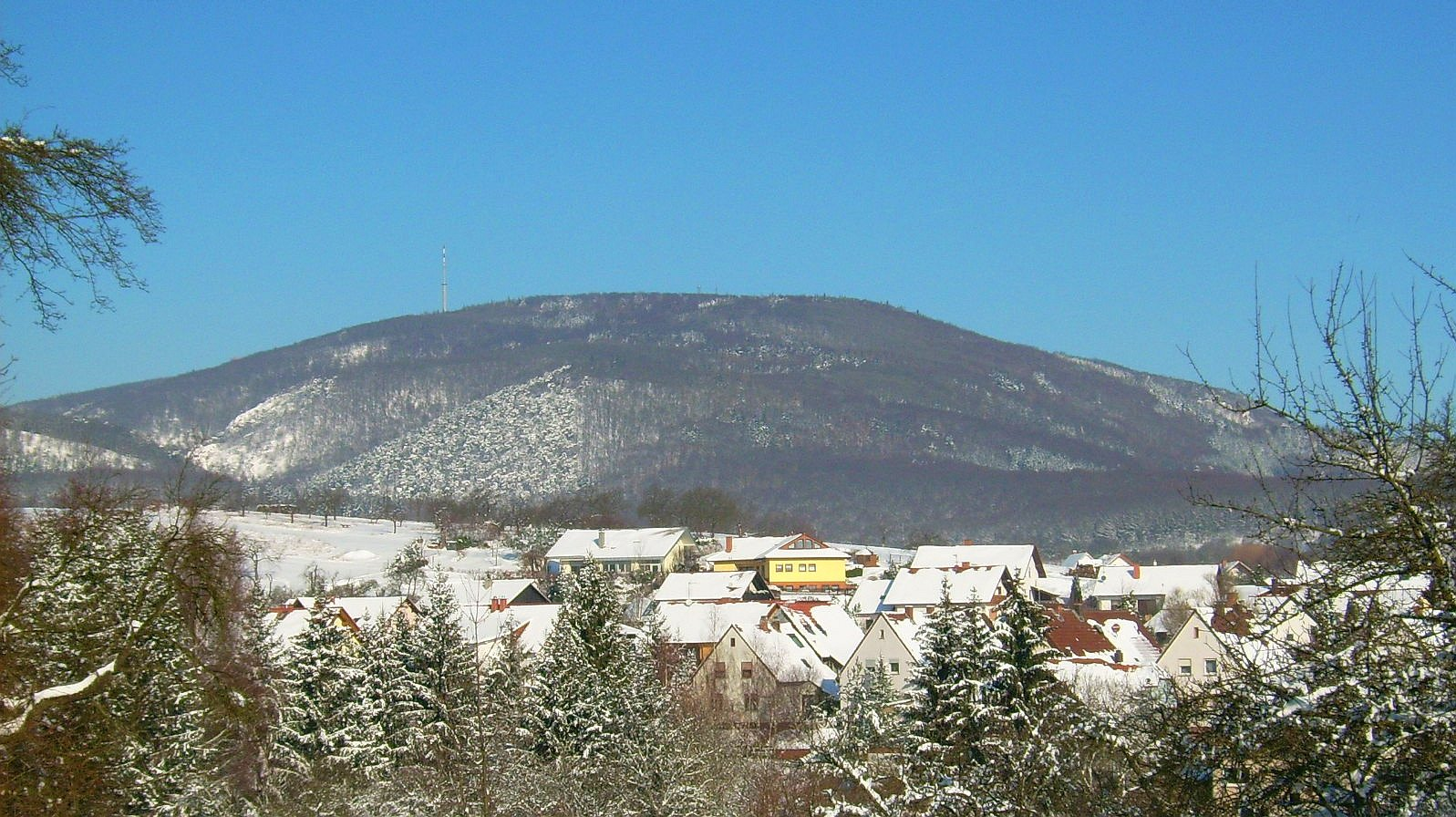
Donnersberg

The North Palatine Uplands is characterised by numerous mountains, hills and valleys which lend the area sharp variations in height from about 200 to over 600 m above sea level (NN). The highest point is the Donnersberg which, at 687 m is also the highest mountain in the Palatinate. The following is a list of prominent mountains and hills in the Uplands, sorted by height in metres above sea level (NHN):

- Donnersberg (686.5 m)
- Trautzberg (603.9 m)
- Füsselberg (595.1 m)
- Weiselberg (569.5 m)
- Königsberg (568.2 m)
- Potzberg (562 m)
- Selberg (545.1 m)
- Herrmannsberg (536.4 m)
- Bornberg (520.0 m)

=== Rivers ===
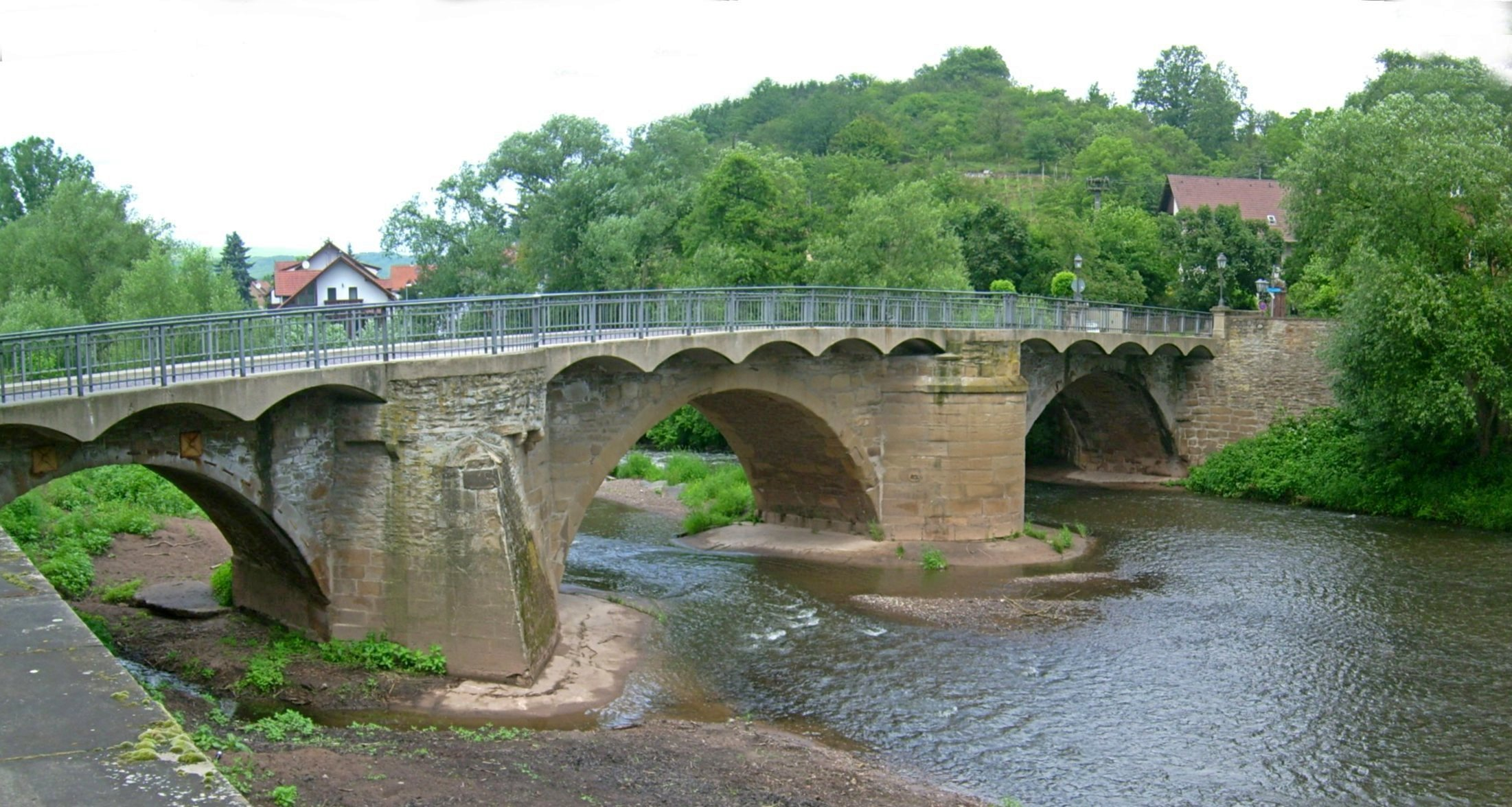
Bridge over the Glan in Meisenheim

Important rivers in the west and north of the range are the 90 km long Glan and the 57 km long Alsenz. The 116 km long Nahe, into which the other two discharge, is no longer included in this region. The area of the Donnersberg is drained towards the east by the 43 km long Pfrimm, which itself rises in the northern Palatine Forest, and the 61 km long Selz. Both flow into the Upper Rhine.

== Name ==
The North Palatine Uplands is also referred to locally as the "Old World" (German: alte Welt or in Palatinate German: die alt Welt or bucklige Welt). However, sometimes the term alte Welt just refers to a strip of land on the border of the districts of Kusel and Kaiserslautern, which is roughly demarcated by the 420, 270 and 48 federal highways and the A 6 and A 63 motorways. Depending on how the region is defined, its largest village is either Nußbach or Obermoschel.

== Settlement ==
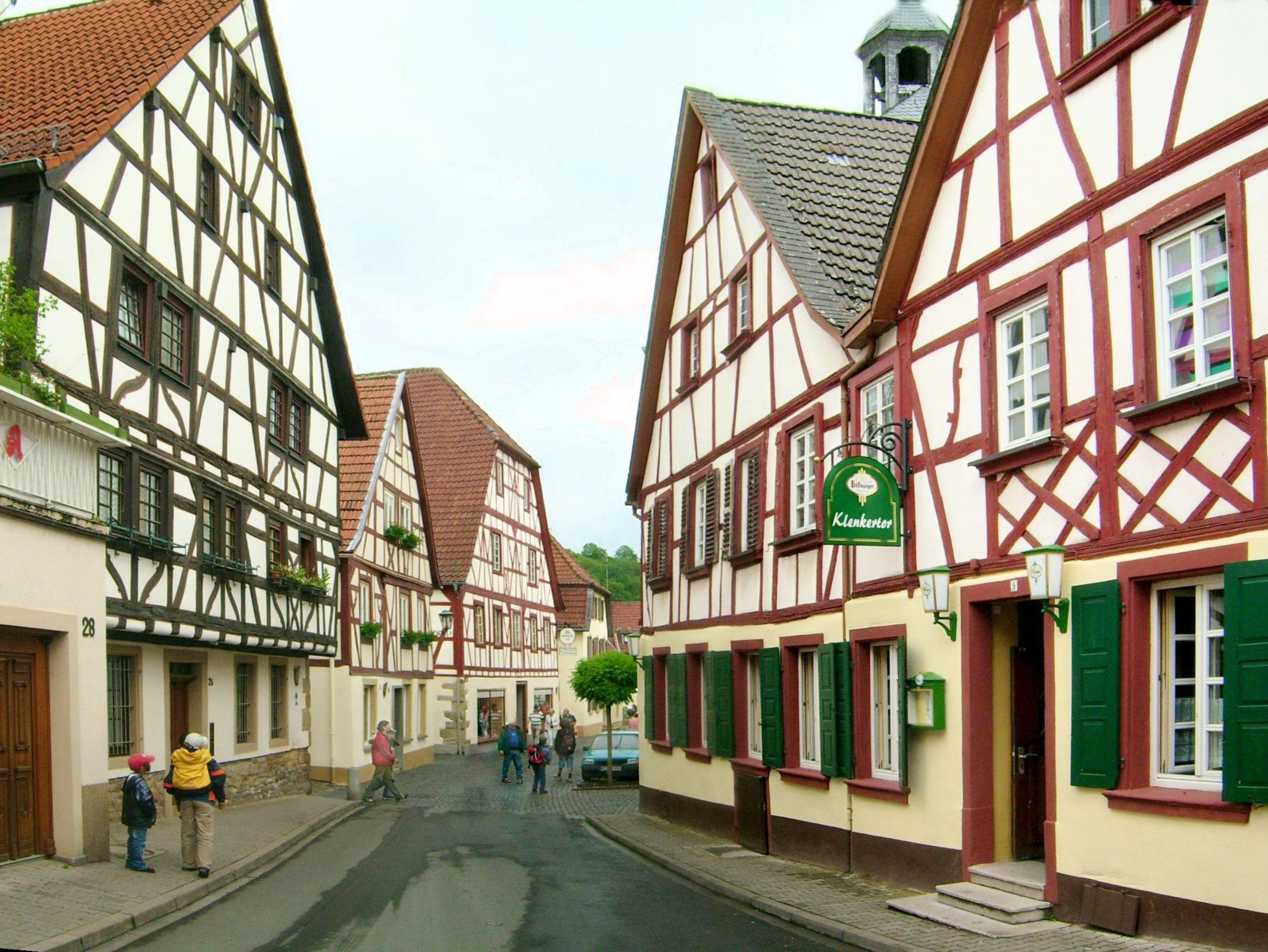
The Altstadt in Meisenheim

The region is very rural in character and has no towns with more than 10,000 inhabitants. Important places are the county towns of Kirchheimbolanden and Kusel, and the collective municipalities of Alsenz, Altenglan, Lauterecken, Meisenheim, Rockenhausen, Winnweiler and Wolfstein.

== Transportation ==
=== Roads ===
Motorways

- A 6 (Saarbrücken–Mannheim)
- A 62 (Landstuhl–Nonnweiler)
- A 63 (Kaiserslautern–Mainz)

Federal roads

- B 40 (Kaiserslautern–Alzey)
- B 48 (Winnweiler–Bad Kreuznach)
- B 270 (Kaiserslautern–Lauterecken)
- B 420 (Ottweiler–Bad Kreuznach)
- B 423 (Waldmohr–Altenglan)

=== Railways ===
- Glan Valley Railway
- Lauter Valley Railway
- Alsenz Valley Railway
- Zeller Valley Railway
- Donnersberg Railway
