= Winnweiler =

- Municipality
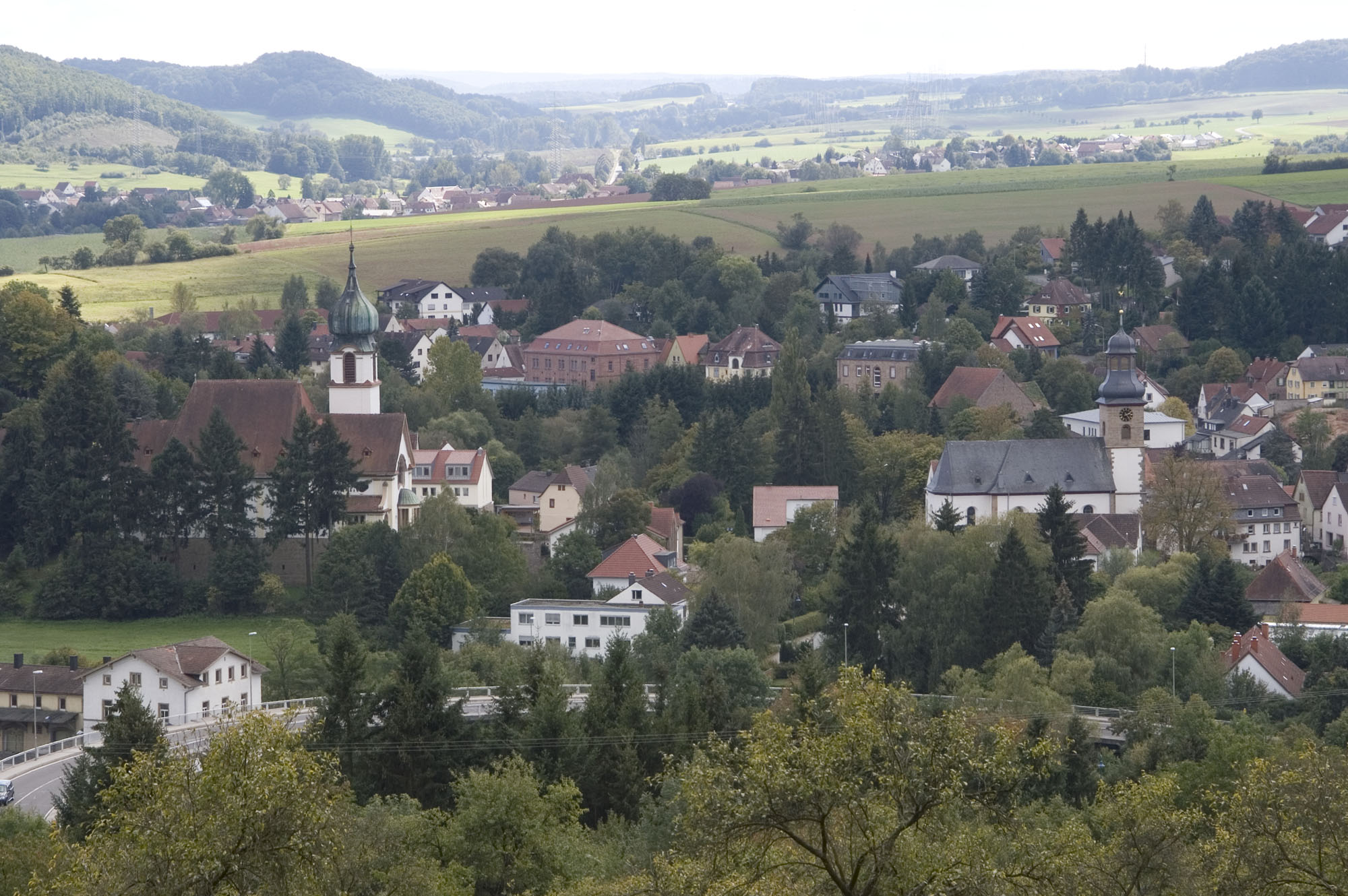
- churches and village center

- Coat of arms

- Location of Winnweiler within Donnersbergkreis district
- Interactive map of Winnweiler
- Location within Germany Location within Rhineland-Palatinate
- Coordinates: 49°34′09″N 7°51′14″E
- Country: Germany
- State: Rhineland-Palatinate
- District: Donnersbergkreis
- Municipal assoc.: Winnweiler
- Subdivisions: 3

Government
  - Mayor (2019–24): Rudolf Jacob (CDU)

Area
  - Total: 21.8 km^{2} (8.4 sq mi)
- Elevation: 240 m (790 ft)

Population (2025-12-31)
  - Total: 4,745
  - Density: 218/km^{2} (564/sq mi)
- Time zone: UTC+01:00 (CET)
  - Summer (DST): UTC+02:00 (CEST)
- Postal codes: 67722
- Dialling codes: 06302
- Vehicle registration: KIB
- Website: www.winnweiler.de

Winnweiler (German pronunciation: [ˈvɪnvaɪlɐ]) is a municipality in the Donnersbergkreis, in Rhineland-Palatinate, Germany. It is situated on the upper course of the river Alsenz, approx. 15 km (9.3 mi) north-east of Kaiserslautern. Winnweiler is the seat of the Verbandsgemeinde ("collective municipality") Winnweiler. Winnweiler station is on the Alsenz Valley Railway (Alsenztalbahn), running between Hochspeyer and Bad Münster am Stein.

The settlement in Rhenish Franconia was first mentioned in an 891 deed, from the 12th century onwards it was a possession of the Counts of Falkenstein. As a Lorraine exclave it fell to the House of Habsburg upon the marriage of Maria Theresa of Austria with Duke Francis III Stephen in 1736. It was thereafter administered as an Oberamt of Further Austria until its occupation by French troops in 1797.

== Geography ==
Winnweiler is located in the Saar-Nahe-Bergland and on the edge of the Donnersberg nature reserve.

The municipality is divided into the following districts

- Alsenbrück-Langmeil with the living quarters Bahnhof Langmeil, Salomonsmühle, Sattelhof, Wäschbacherhof and Ziegelhütte
- Hochstein with the residential areas Eisenschmelz, Kahlheckerhof and Kupferschmelz
- Potzbach with the Leithöfe residential area
- Winnweiler with the residential areas Igelbornerhöhe and chapel

== Culture ==
To the east of Winnweiler on the Leisbühl stands a war memorial from 1933, in whose half-open hall a soldier figure as well as commemorative plaques with the names of fallen soldiers commemorate the two world wars. At the northern corner of the square building there is an attached 12.5 m high stair tower leading to an 8.5 m high viewing platform above the hall. From here you have a good view towards Winnweiler and the surrounding area.

== Economy and infrastructure ==
=== Traffic ===
Winnweiler is connected to the national road network via the Federal Motorway 63 (Mainz-Kaiserslautern) and the Federal Road 48 (Bingen am Rhein-Bad Bergzabern). The Bingen-Winnweiler section was already a national road (R 40). There was also a station on the Alsenztalbahn (Kaiserslautern-Bingen) in Langmeil, which, however, has not been served since December 2006, as demand had fallen sharply due to the better locations of the Winnweiler and Enkenbach stations and the opening of the Münchweiler stop on the Alsenz in 1999. Here the Zellertalbahn (Monsheim-Langmeil) branches off. This line has been used for some years on Sundays and public holidays in summer again for the excursion traffic. The trains run from Monsheim via Langmeil to Hochspeyer.

=== Education ===
In addition to the Montessori primary school, the town also offers the Realschule plus Albert-Schweitzer-Schule. There is also the Wilhelm-Erb-Gymnasium, a former Latin school. The next university town is Kaiserslautern.

=== Sports ===
Winnweiler is served by a local sports club, ASV Winnweiler. This club was formed in 1910 and continues to provide sports training and character-building in young people. ASV Winnweiler fields teams at most levels of official German football from grade school to adult men and women's teams. The sports field consists of one lighted turf pitch, one lighted smaller cage (for warm-up or training similar to futsal or indoor football), and one grass pitch. The clubhouse is a full-service clubhouse with food, drinks, indoor and outdoor seating, and restrooms - along with several locker rooms for the players. Play on the turf pitch can be viewed from the clubhouse. Matches are played among local teams and friendly rivalries are common.

== Notable people ==
- Wilhelm Heinrich Erb (1840 – 1921), neurologist
