= Jakobsweiler =

- Municipality
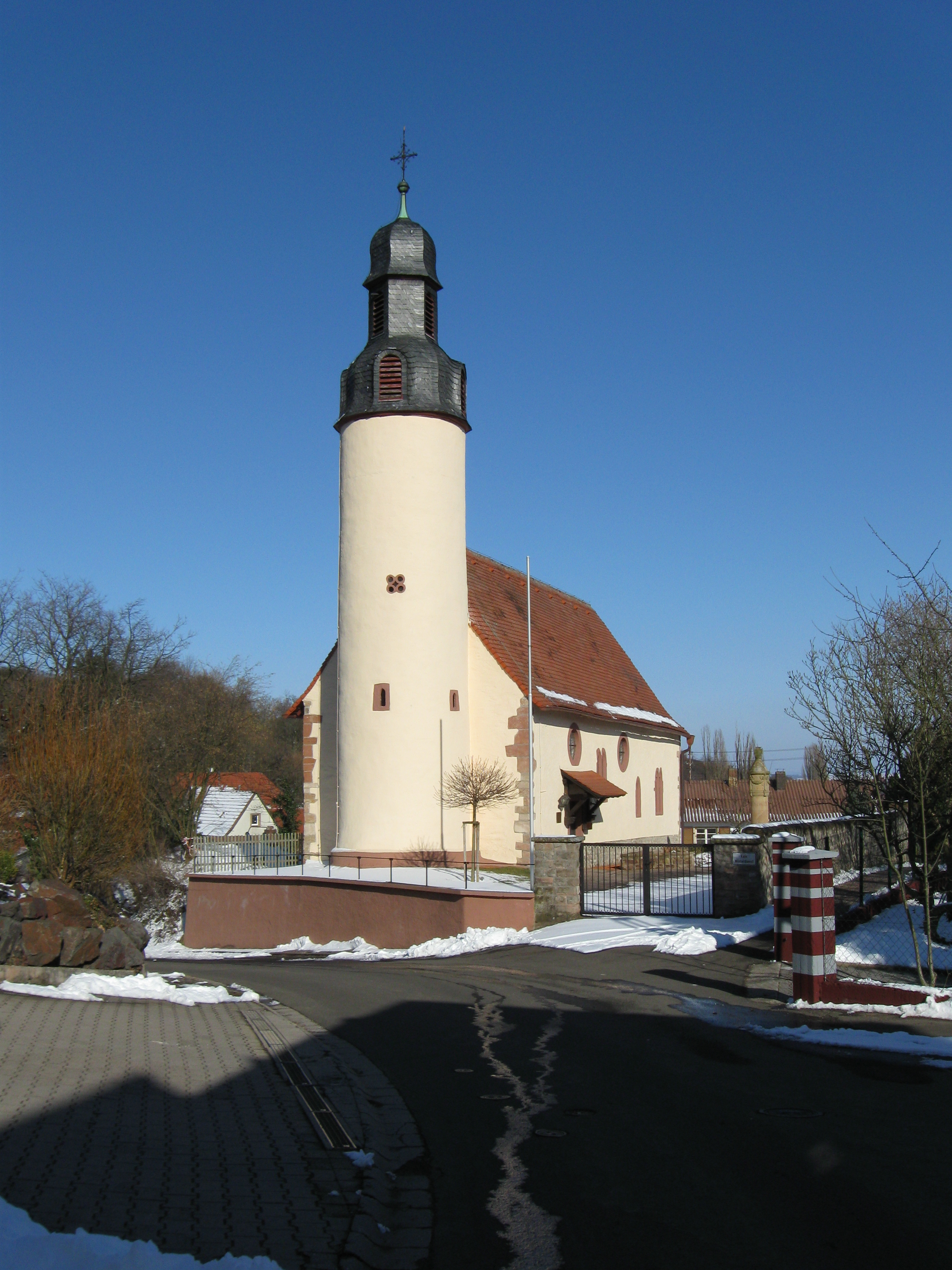
- fortified church (built in the 12th century)

- Coat of arms

- Location of Jakobsweiler within Donnersbergkreis district
- Interactive map of Jakobsweiler
- Location within Germany Location within Rhineland-Palatinate
- Coordinates: 49°36′44″N 7°57′21″E
- Country: Germany
- State: Rhineland-Palatinate
- District: Donnersbergkreis
- Municipal assoc.: Kirchheimbolanden

Government
  - Mayor (2019–24): Albert Helmut Niederauer

Area
  - Total: 2.41 km^{2} (0.93 sq mi)
- Elevation: 297 m (974 ft)

Population (2025-12-31)
  - Total: 255
  - Density: 106/km^{2} (274/sq mi)
- Time zone: UTC+01:00 (CET)
  - Summer (DST): UTC+02:00 (CEST)
- Postal codes: 67814
- Dialling codes: 06357
- Vehicle registration: KIB

Jakobsweiler (German pronunciation: [ˈjaːkɔpsˌvaɪlɐ]) is a municipality in the Donnersbergkreis district, in Rhineland-Palatinate, Germany.

== Geography ==
The village is located in the North Palatinate at the foot of the Donnersberg mountain. Neighbouring municipalities are Dannenfels, Bennhausen, Weitersweiler and Steinbach am Donnersberg.

== History ==
It is speculated that Jakobsweiler was already settled during the Roman era. There is no proof for this theory. Jakobsweiler got its name in 1190.

After the War of the First Coalition Jakobsweiler was occupied and later annexed by France with the Treaty of Campo Formio in 1797. From 1798 to 1814 it belonged to the French Departement du Mont-Tonnerre. After the Congress of Vienna the region was first given to Austria (1815) and later to Bavaria (1816).

After World War II Jakobsweiler became part of Rhineland-Palatinate (1946). Since 1969 it belongs to the Donnersbergkreis district.

== Politics ==
=== Council ===
The village council is composed of 6 members who were elected in the local elections on June 9, 2024, and the honorary mayor as chairman.

=== Heraldry ===
The coat of arms was granted in 1976.

== Infrastructure ==
The A63 is located 5.5 km (3.5 mi) to the southeast.
