= Gumbel =

Gumbel or Gumble is a surname. Notable people with the surname include:

- Albert Gumble (1883–1946), American musician
- Bryant Gumbel (born 1948), American television sportscaster, brother of Greg
- David Heinz Gumbel (1906–1992), Israeli designer and silversmith
- Emil Julius Gumbel (1891–1966), German mathematician, pacifist and anti-Nazi campaigner
- Greg Gumbel (1946–2024), American television sportscaster, brother of Bryant
- Nicky Gumbel (born 1955), Anglican priest and author
- Thomas Gumble (died 1676), English biographer
- Wilhelm Theodor Gumbel (1812–1858), German bryologist
- Wilhelm von Gumbel (1823–1898), German geologist

== Fictional ==
- Barney Gumble, a fictional character from The Simpsons
