= Wildenstein Castle (Palatinate) =

- Burg Wildenstein
- Dannenfels
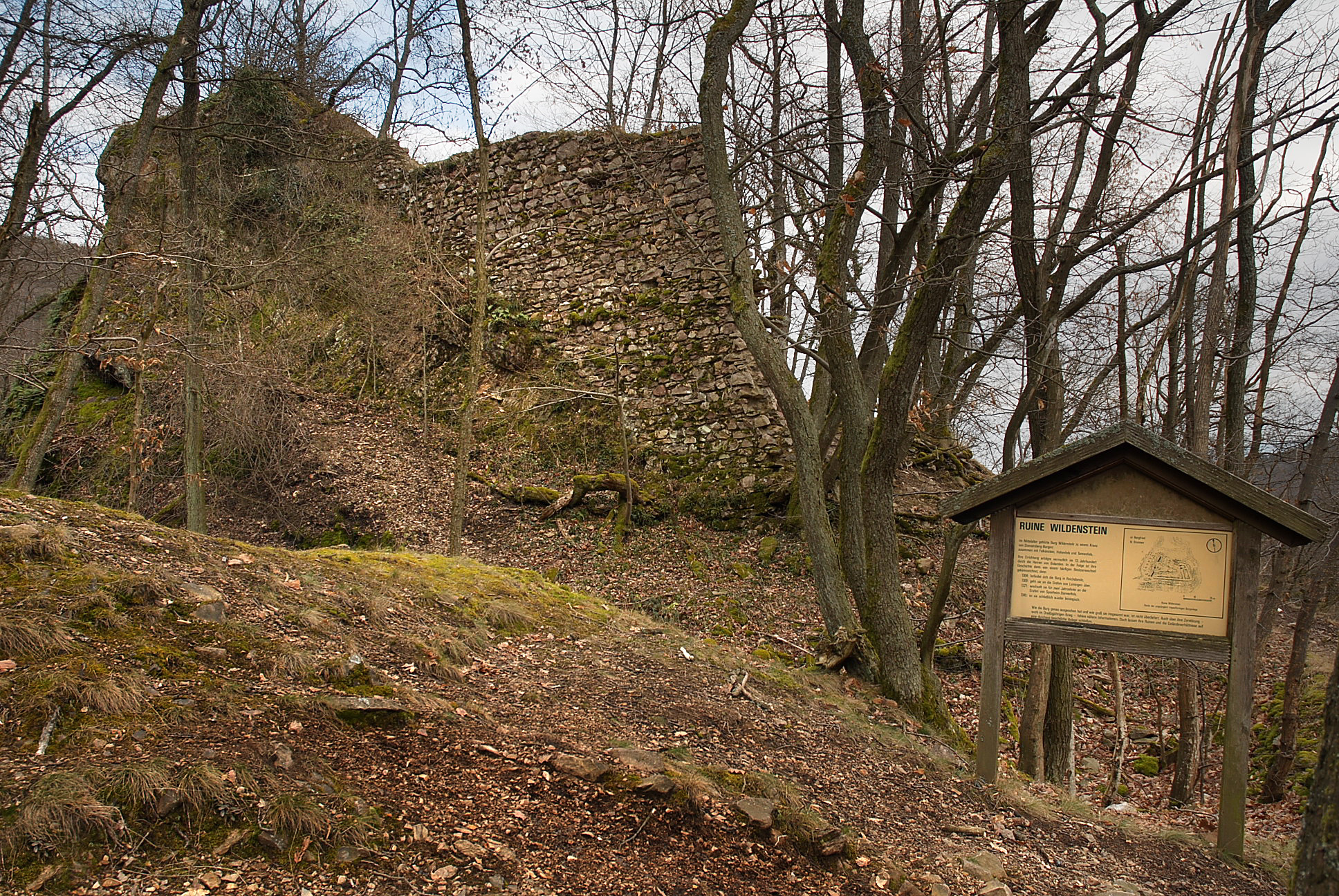

Site information
- Type: hill castle, motte
- Code: DE-RP
- Condition: wall remains

Location
- Coordinates: 49°36′51.12″N 7°55′29.64″E
- Height: 486 m above sea level (NN)

Site history
- Built: c. 1200

Garrison information
- Occupants: free nobility

Wildenstein Castle (German: Burg Wildenstein) is a ruined hill castle on a hill, 486 m above sea level (NN), in the Wildenstein valley (Wildensteiner Tal), hidden in a wood at the foot of the Donnersberg near Dannenfels in the county of Donnersbergkreis in the German state of Rhineland-Palatinate.

The castles is of the motte and bailey type. Together with the three other ruined castles of Falkenstein, Hohenfels and Tannenfels, it forms the ring of the "Donnersberg Castles".
