= Dannenfels =

- Municipality
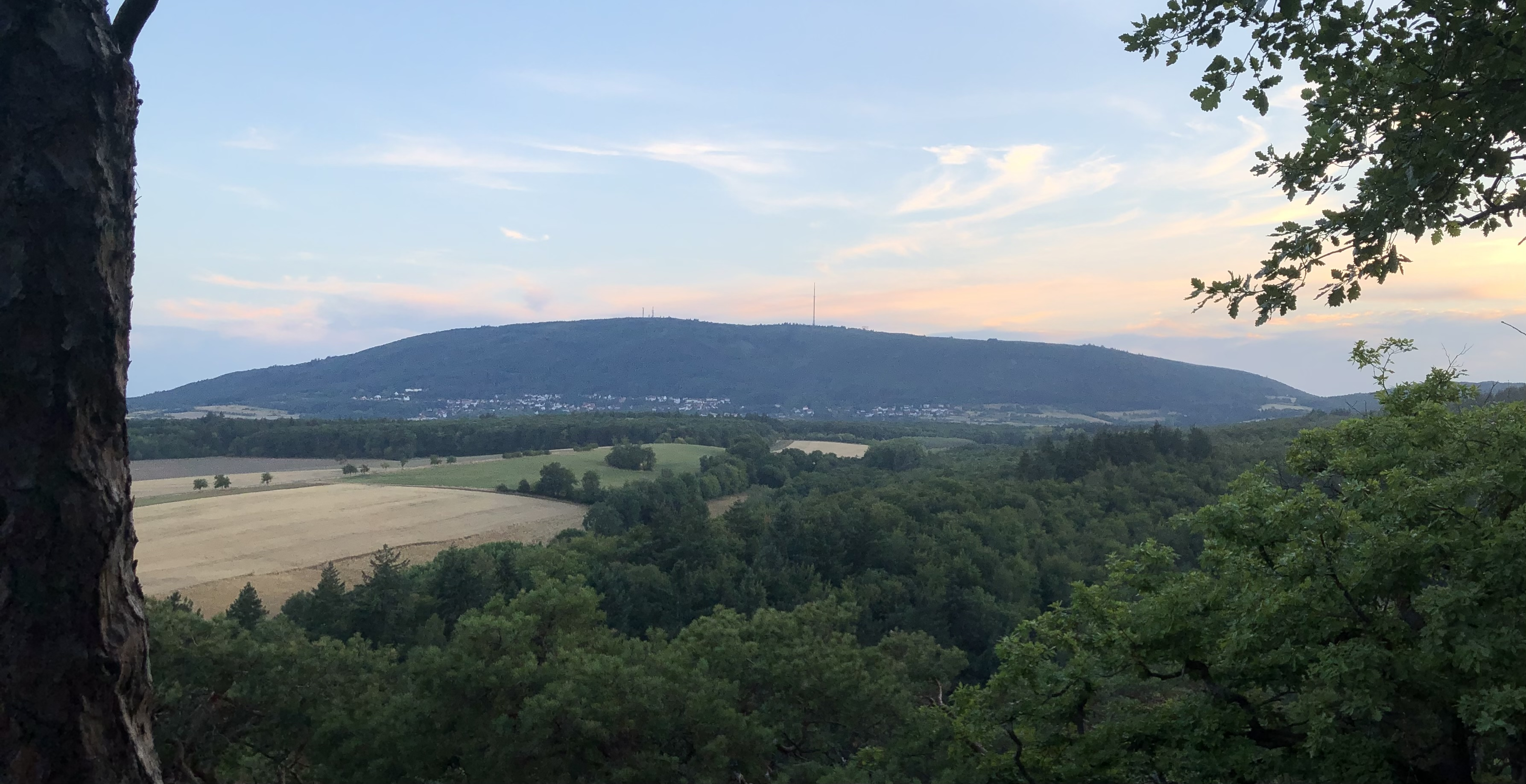
- Dannenfels at the foothills of Donnersberg mountain

- Coat of arms

- Location of Dannenfels within Donnersbergkreis district
- Interactive map of Dannenfels
- Location within Germany Location within Rhineland-Palatinate
- Coordinates: 49°37′42.10″N 7°56′34.60″E
- Country: Germany
- State: Rhineland-Palatinate
- District: Donnersbergkreis
- Municipal assoc.: Kirchheimbolanden

Government
  - Mayor (2019–24): Ernst Ludwig Huy

Area
  - Total: 15.78 km^{2} (6.09 sq mi)
- Elevation: 400 m (1,300 ft)

Population (2025-12-31)
  - Total: 887
  - Density: 56.2/km^{2} (146/sq mi)
- Time zone: UTC+01:00 (CET)
  - Summer (DST): UTC+02:00 (CEST)
- Postal codes: 67814
- Dialling codes: 06357
- Vehicle registration: KIB
- Website: www.dannenfels.de

Dannenfels (German pronunciation: [ˈdanənfɛls]) is a municipality in the Donnersbergkreis district, in Rhineland-Palatinate, Germany.

== Geography ==
=== Physical geography ===
Dannenfels is located in the North Palatine Uplands at altitude of 400 m (1300 ft). A large part of the Donnersbergmassiv is located inside the municipal limits, including the peak itself. fruit trees are grown below the village, protected by the shadow of the mountain. Forests dominate the landscape above the village. Due to the exposed location the Upper Rhine Plain and the Kraichgau region on the other side of the Rhine can be seen from Dannenfels.

=== Climate ===
The yearly precipitation is 808 mm. The precipitation falls in the mid third of the results recorded in Germany. Lower results are recorded at 65% of DWD stations. The driest month is September, most precipitation happens in June. There is 1.4 times more precipitation in June than in September. Precipitation varies minimally and is extremely even spread out across the year. Lower variations are only recorded at 4% of DWD stations.

=== Political geography ===
Besides the village proper, the inhabited places Bastenhaus, Dannenfelsermühle and Haus Donnersberg are part of the municipality.

Neighbouring municipalities are Kirchheimbolanden, Bolanden, Jakobsweiler, Steinbach am Donnersberg and Rockenhausen.

== History ==
Dannenfels was declared a city in 1331, initiated by Count Philipp of Sponheim-Bolanden. His son Heinrich II of Sponheim-Bolanden moved the court to Kirchheimbolanden in 1370. After his death in 1393 his granddaughter and through her, her husband Philipp I, Count of Nassau-Weilburg inherited the Dominion of Kirchheim and Stauf. Because of this the lion of Nassau is included in the village's coat of arms.

Until the end of the 18th century Dannenfels was part of the Duchy of Nassau-Weilburg and was administered from Kirchheimbolanden.

After the War of the First Coalition Dannenfels was occupied and later annexed by France with the Treaty of Campo Formio in 1797. From 1798 to 1814 it belonged to the French Departement du Mont-Tonnerre. After the Congress of Vienna the region was first given to Austria (1815) and later to Bavaria (1816).

On 11 June 1922 Fritz Heß became mayor of Dannenfels, arguably making him the first national socialist mayor in Germany.

After World War II Dannenfels became part of Rhineland-Palatinate (1946). Since 1969 it belongs to the Donnersbergkreis district.

== Politics ==
=== Council ===
The village council is composed of 12 members who were elected in a personalized proportional representation in the local elections on June 9, 2024, and the honorary mayor as chairman.

=== Heraldry ===
The coat of arms was granted by the Bavarian Ministry of the Interior in 1925. It is based on seal from 1658.

=== Partnership ===
Dannenfels is twinned with Abaliget, Hungary.

== Points of interest ==
=== Buildings ===
==== Protected buildings ====
- Tannenfels Castle (Palatinate)
- Wildenstein Castle (Palatinate)
- Donnersberghaus (old school house)
- Protestant church
- Ludwigsturm (Ludwig's tower)
- Adlerbogen (Eagle arch)

==== Other buildings ====
The Sender Donnersberg radio tower is located here.

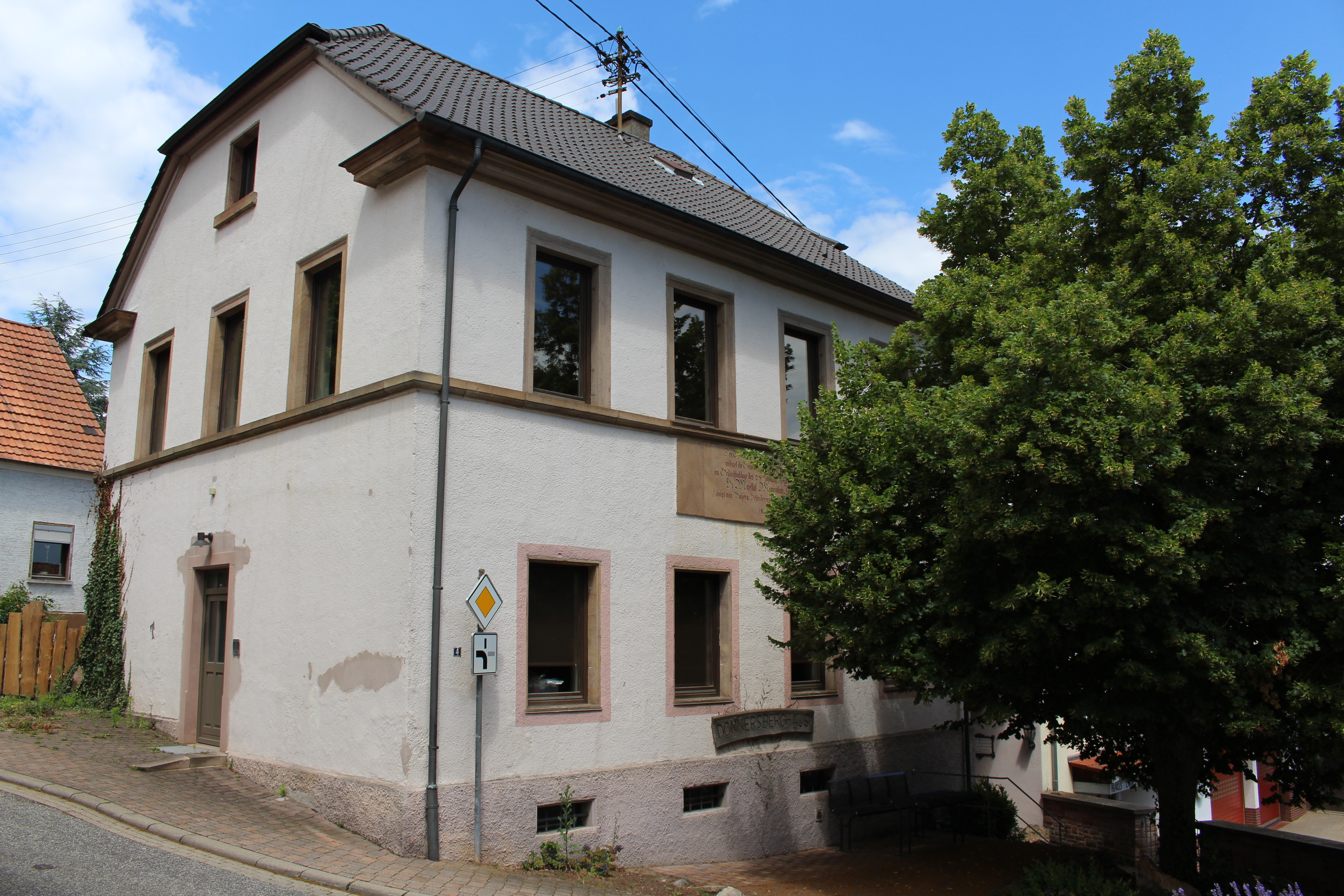
Donnersberghaus

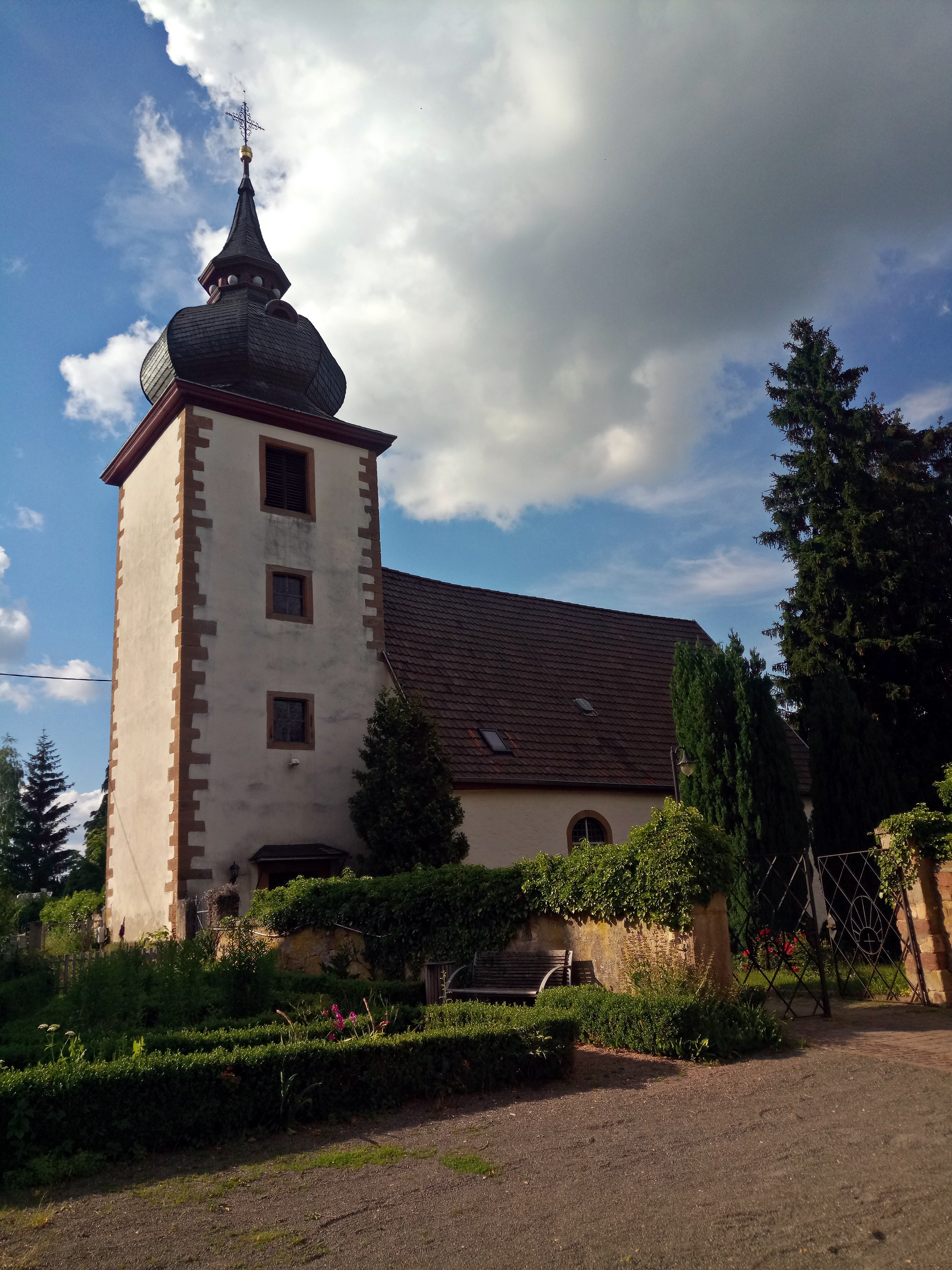
prot. church

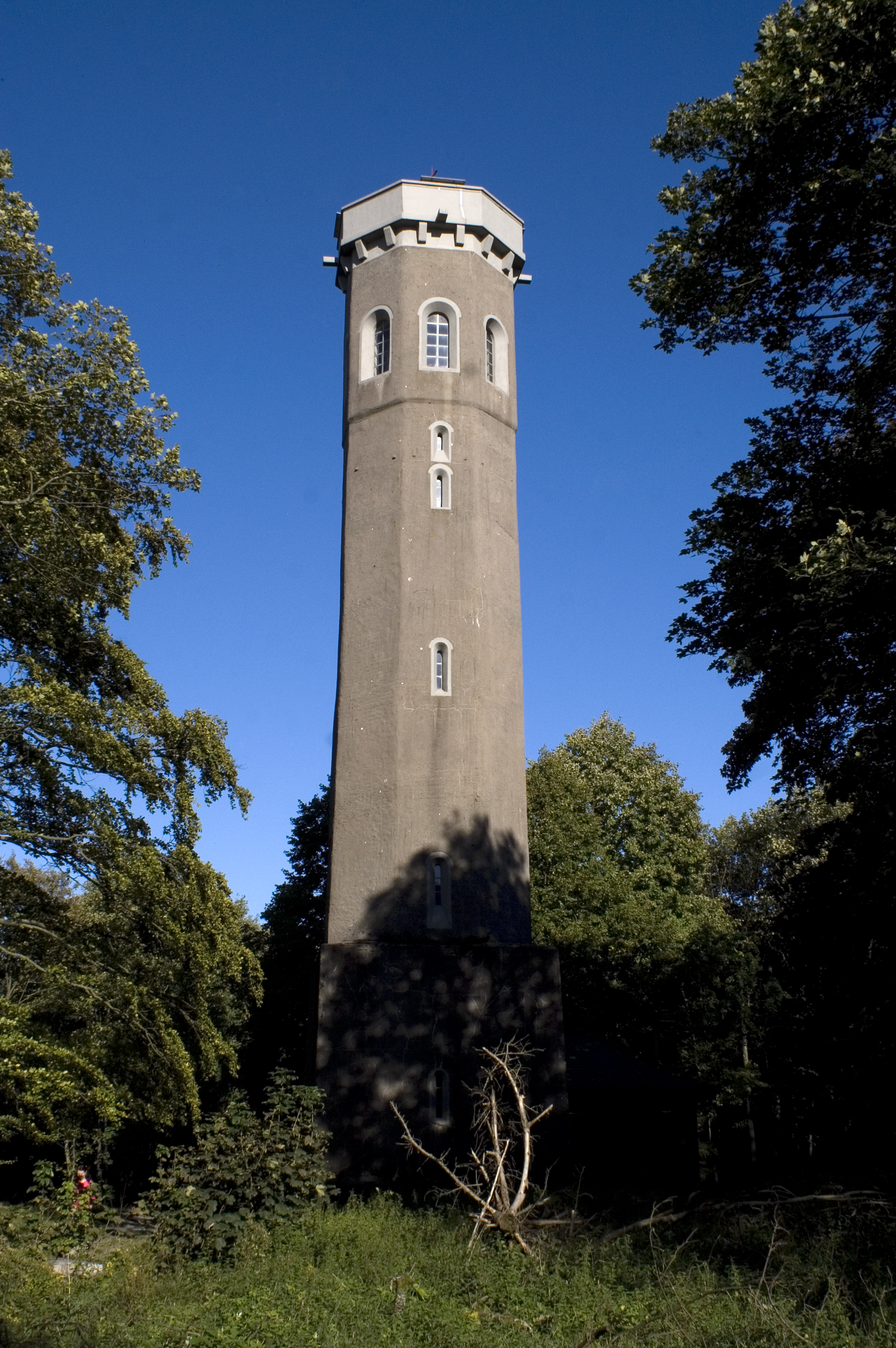
Ludwigsturm

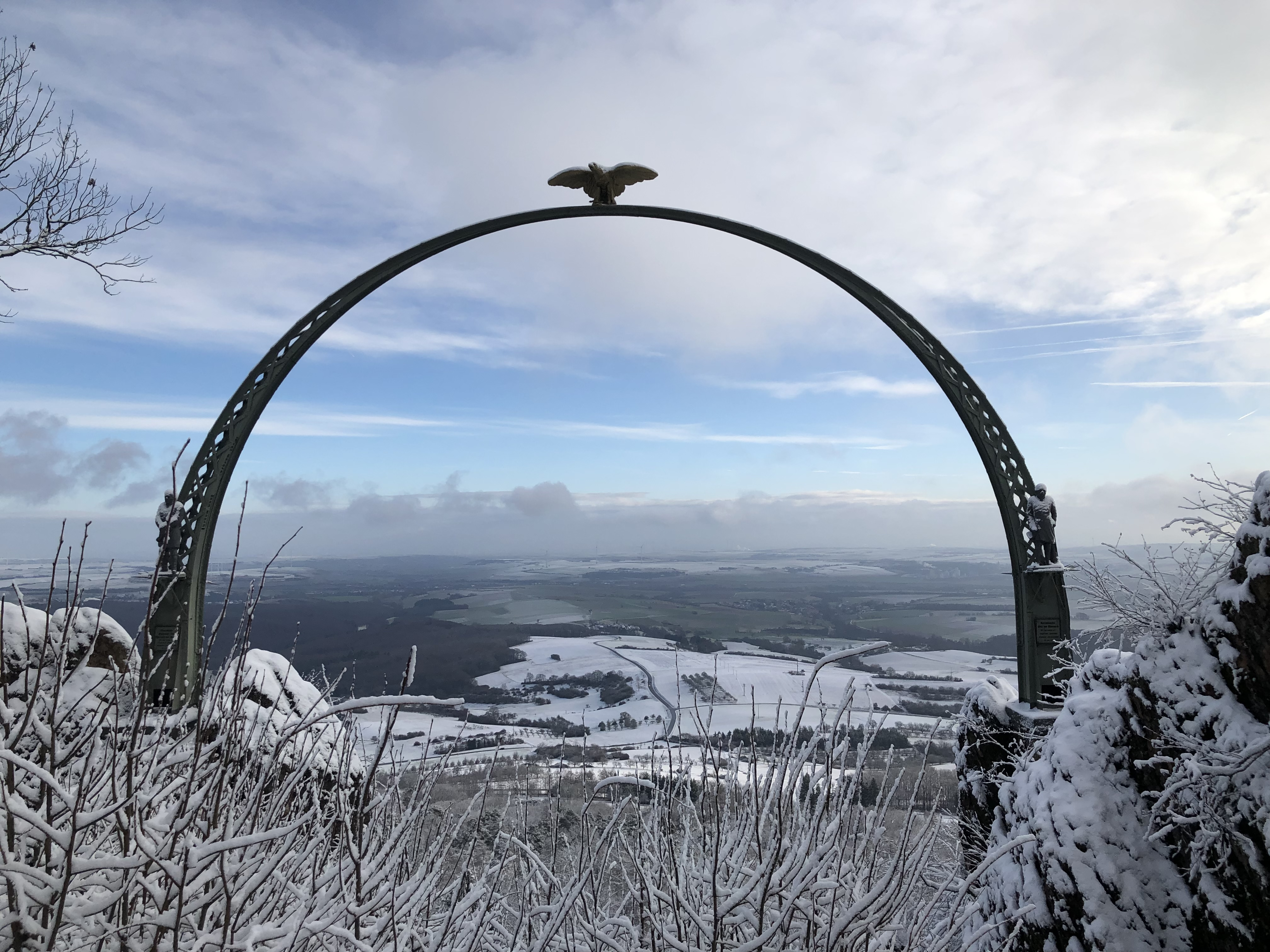
Adlerbogen

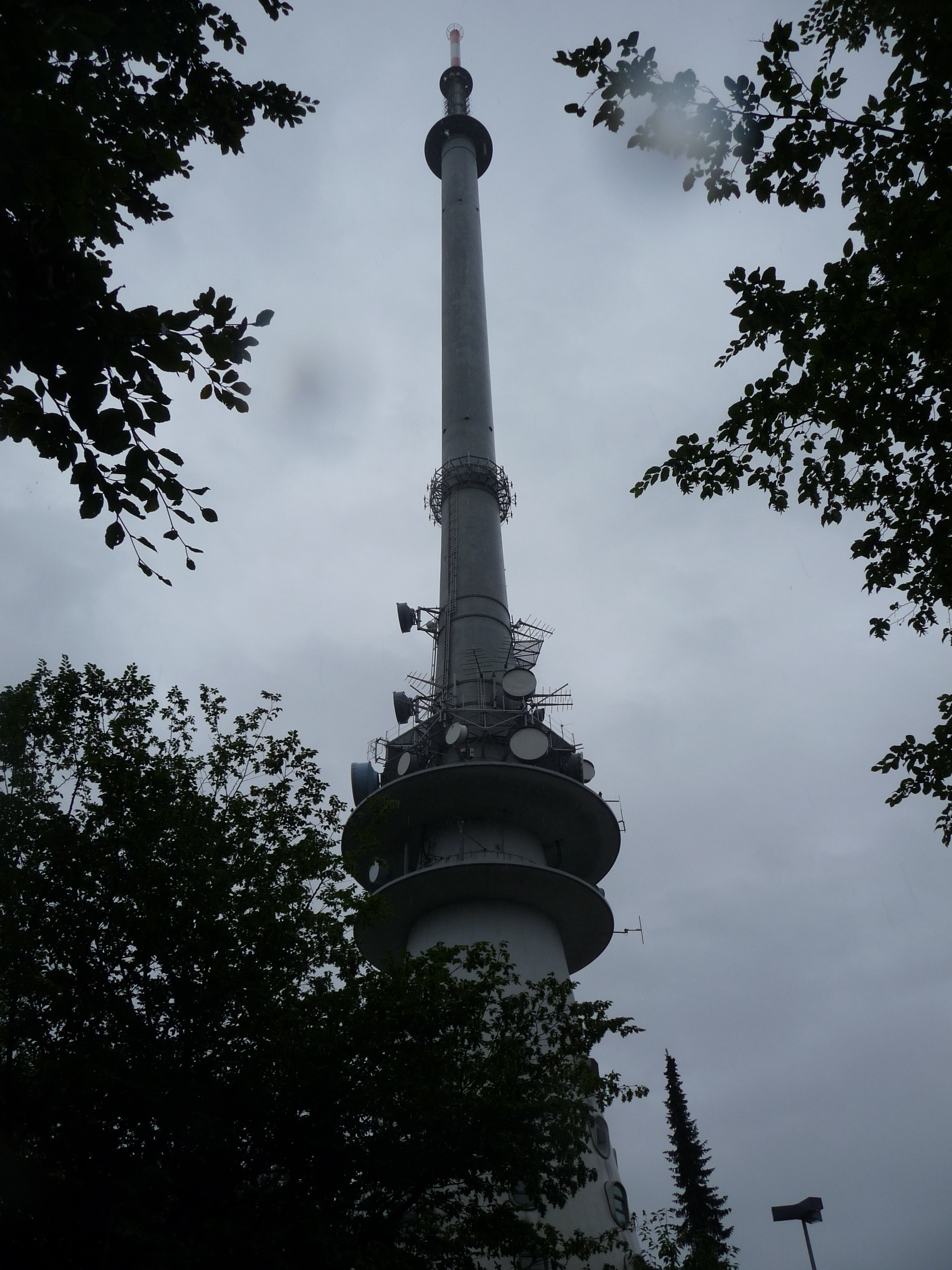
Sender Donnersberg

=== Natural monuments ===
==== Dicke Keschde ====
This Sweet chestnut tree on Dannenfels' main street is said to be 650 years old. Other sources attest it an age of 400–600 years. It is the thickest sweet chestnut north of the Alps.

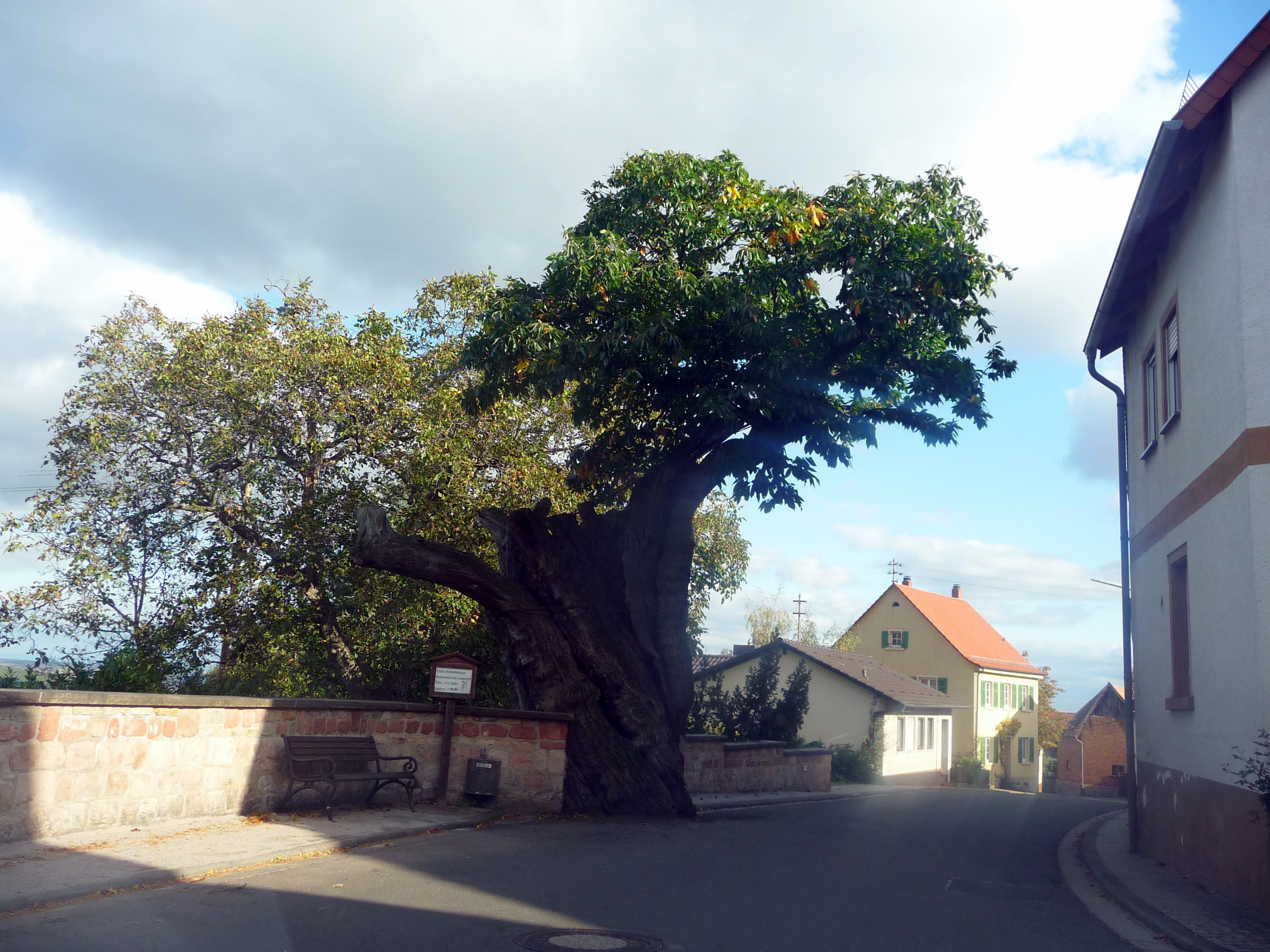
Dicke Keschde in 2009

==== Protected areas ====
- Eschdell nature reserve
- Königsstuhl rock formation

== Economy and infrastructure ==
=== Economy ===
In the late 19th century BASF built recreational facilities for their workers.

=== Tourism ===
There are multiple restaurants in Dannenfels. And an hut managed by the Palatine Forest Club. Several hiking trails run through the area.

=== Infrastructure ===
==== Roads ====
The village itself is connected by multiple state roads. Two minor roads lead up the Donnersberg mountain. The A63 runs 6 km (4 mi) south of Dannenfels.

==== Public transit ====
Dannenfels is served by the 901 bus line of the VRN, that runs from Rockenhausen to Kirchheimbolanden, rail transfer is possible at both ends.

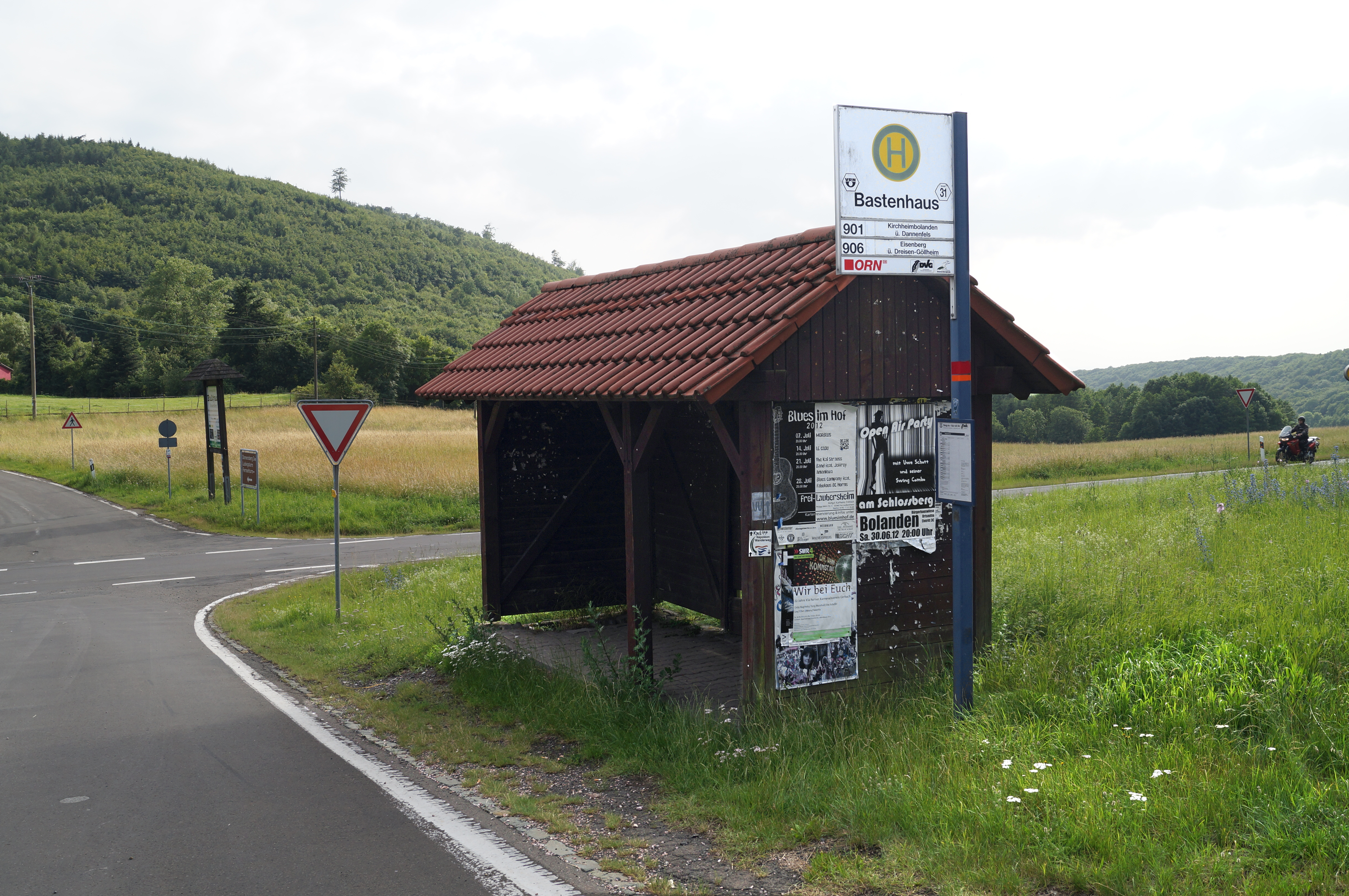
bus stop at Bastenhaus

==== Education ====
Dannenfels has an elementary school that is also visited by children from Bennhausen and Jakobsweiler.

==== Military ====
The Dannenfels Communications Station of the Seventh United States Army was closed in 1991.

== People ==
=== Born in Dannenfels ===
- Wilhelm Theodor Gümbel (1812-1858), botanist
- Karl Wilhelm von Gümbel (1823-1898), geologist
- Fritz Heß, (1879-1938), politician (NSDAP)
- Michael Weiß (born 1965), football manager

=== Connected to Dannenfels ===
- Erich Spickschen (1897-1957), NS-Landesbauernführer in East Prussia, rented an inn here in 1950
- Moritz Anton Konerding (1960-2015), anatomist, died in a plane crash near the village
