= Bennhausen =

- Municipality
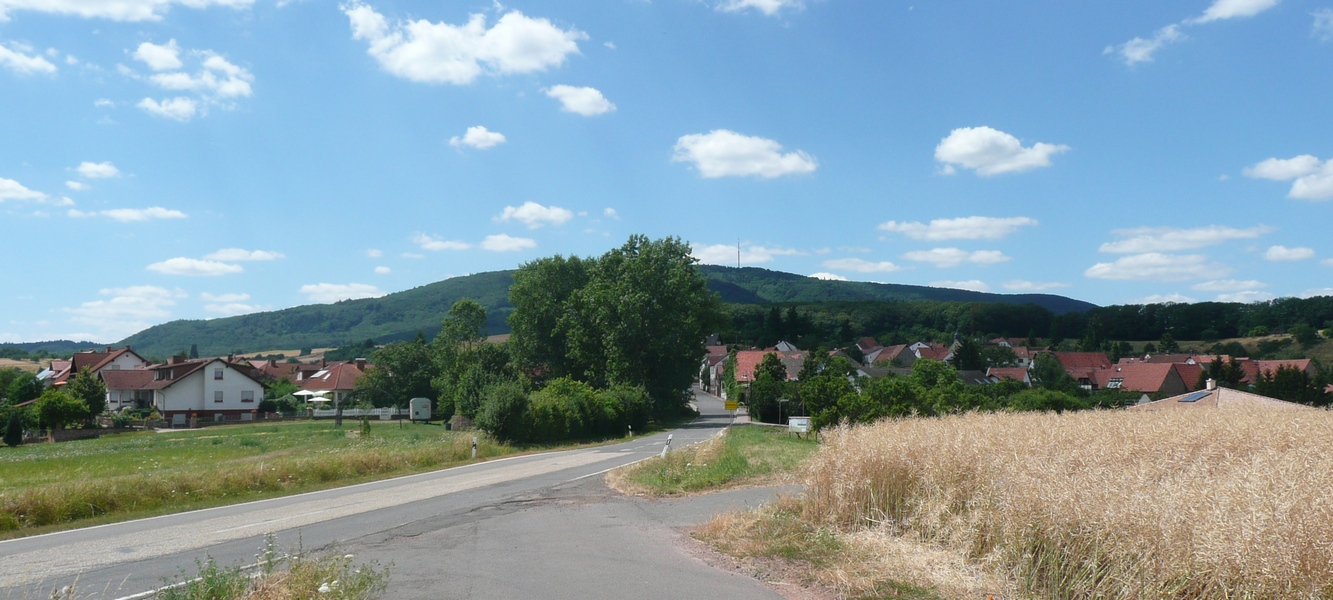

- Coat of arms

- Location of Bennhausen within Donnersbergkreis district
- Interactive map of Bennhausen
- Location within Germany Location within Rhineland-Palatinate
- Coordinates: 49°37′20.88″N 7°58′44.54″E
- Country: Germany
- State: Rhineland-Palatinate
- District: Donnersbergkreis
- Municipal assoc.: Kirchheimbolanden

Government
  - Mayor (2019–24): Reinhard Horsch

Area
  - Total: 1.49 km^{2} (0.58 sq mi)
- Elevation: 281 m (922 ft)

Population (2025-12-31)
  - Total: 154
  - Density: 103/km^{2} (268/sq mi)
- Time zone: UTC+01:00 (CET)
  - Summer (DST): UTC+02:00 (CEST)
- Postal codes: 67808
- Dialling codes: 06357
- Vehicle registration: KIB
- Website: kirchheimbolanden.de

Bennhausen is a municipality in the Donnersbergkreis district, in Rhineland-Palatinate, Germany. It belongs to the Verbandsgemeinde of Kirchheimbolanden.

== Geography ==
Bennhausen has an area of 1.49 km². It is situated in the North Palatine Uplands, at the foot of the Donnersberg, which lies about 3 km west of the village. The land to the west and north of the hilly landscape is mainly planted with orchards, and the forest almost reaches the outskirts of the village. The land to the south and east consists mainly of agricultural farmland.

The neighboring municipalities are Weitersweiler (south-east), Jakobsweiler (west), Dannenfels (north-west) and Bolanden (east).

== History ==
Bennhausen was documented for the first time, in 1252, as Benninhusen. In 1376, the city belonged to the Palatinate. During the Thirty Years' War, Bennhausen was completely destroyed. In 1706, it was given to the Earls of Nassau-Weilburg. Since 1816, Bennhausen has belonged to the municipality of Dannenfels.

== Administration ==
=== Politics ===
The local council in Bennhausen consists of six members, elected in a majority vote, and the honorary mayor as chairman. The last local elections took place on 7 June 2009.

Mayors
1960–1974	Richard Zerger
1974–1982	Erich Eymann
1983–1993	Reinhold Huy
1994–	Reinhard Horsch

=== Coat of arms ===
The coat of arms is a "red and silver diagonally divided, top right six-spoked silver wheel, bottom left a red deer pierced by a red arrow". It was approved in 1976 by the government of the Neustadt district.

The Wheel of Mainz recalls that Bennhausen belongs to the diocese of Mainz. The doe is the attribute of Saint Giles, one of the Fourteen Holy Helpers, to which an earlier chapel was dedicated.

== Economy and infrastructures ==
As is typical of similar villages, the place was characterized, till the 1960s, by agriculture. Today, commuters dominate, in economic terms. Two new settlements were established around 1980 and 2005, respectively. In the original center, some houses have been renovated by both locals and newcomers. There are also former agricultural properties.

The former elementary school, operated until 1960, has been fully renovated and greatly expanded; it now serves as a community center for various purposes. Bennhausen has a volunteer fire department, including a Youth Fire Brigade. Community patrons organize cultural events, festivals and the fairs, which take place on the 3rd weekend of August.

The L 397 passes through the village. Approximately 3 km southeast, at the Göllheim exit, it connects with the A 63 (Kaiserslautern - Mainz). In the southwestern direction, Kaiserslautern is approximately 30 km. To the north, Mainz is about 50 km away. In Dreisen, 4 km away from Bennhausen, the railway line has been closed down and operates only on weekends during the summer months, through the Zellertal railway. The nearest regular railway station is in Kirchheimbolanden, with connection to Alzey and Mainz, as well as to Winnweiler, connecting there with Kaiserslautern and Bad Kreuznach.

== Demographics ==
Bennhausen has a population of 156 (as of December 31, 2011).

Population
2004	2006	2009	2010	2011
141	148	145	157	156
