= Wilhelm von Gümbel =

German geologist (1823–1898)

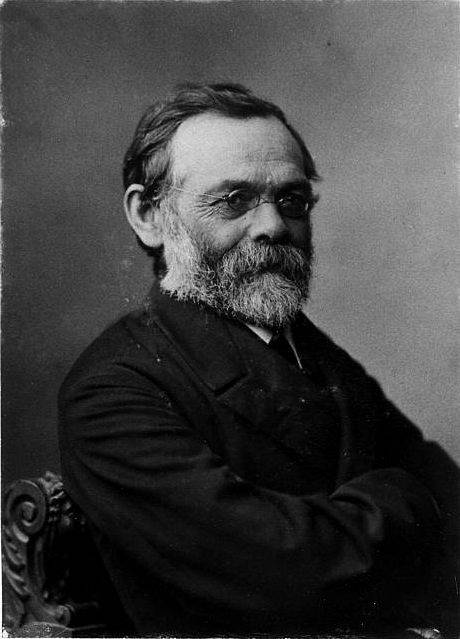

Karl Wilhelm Gümbel or Karl Wilhelm von Gümbel after 1882 (11 February 1823 – 18 June 1898), German geologist, was born at Dannenfels, in the Palatinate of the Rhine, and is known chiefly by his researches on the geology of Bavaria. He wrote a two-volume work on the geology of Bavaria between 1888 and 1894. In 1845, he produced a map of the geology of Bavaria at a scale of 1:500,000, and it was printed in 1858. He was the brother of bryologist Wilhelm Theodor Gümbel (1812–1858).

== Biography ==
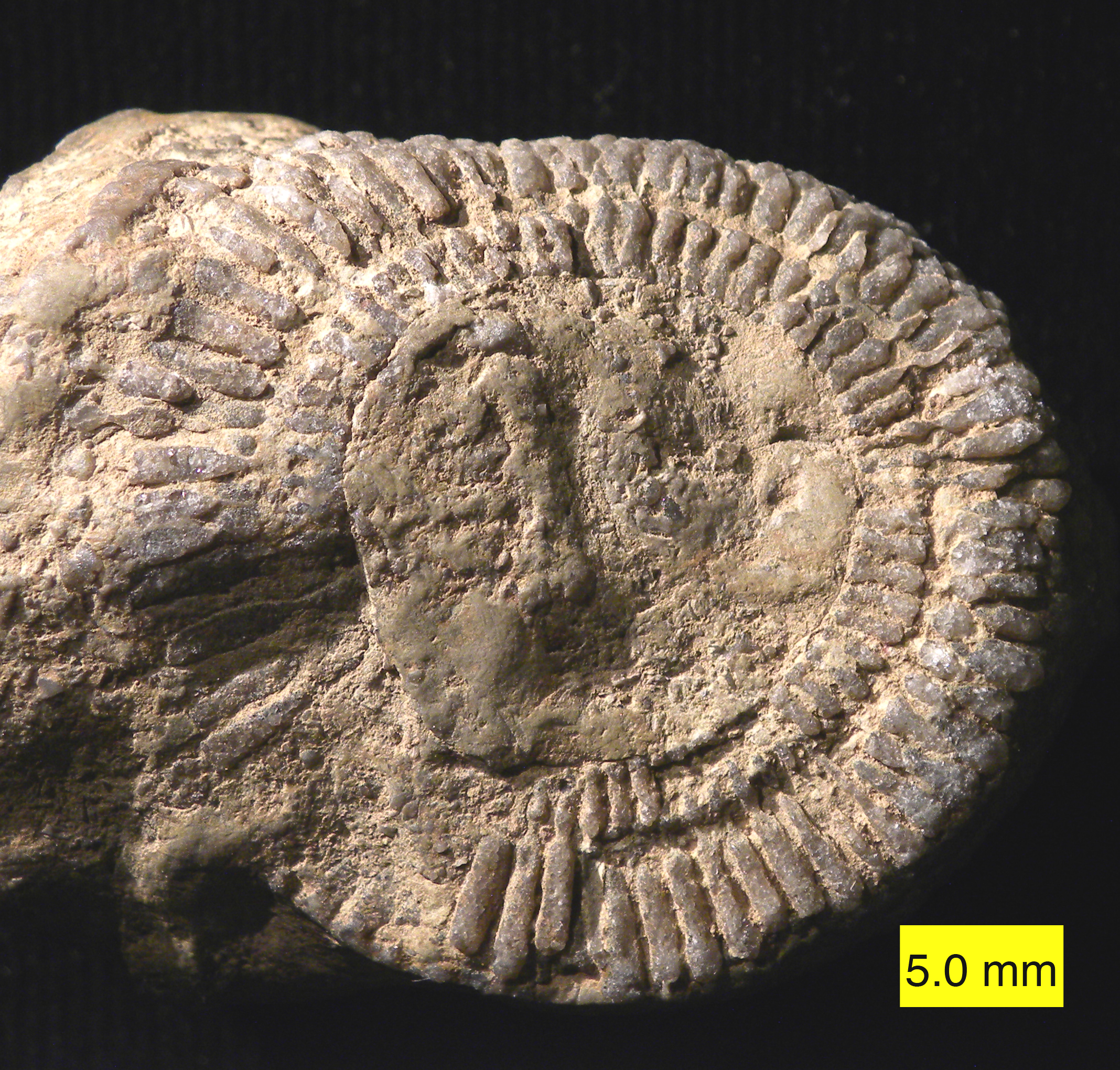
Receptaculitid fossil as studied by von Gümbel.

Gümbel was born in Dannefels where his father was a district forester. He went to high school in Zweibrücken and then studied natural sciences with an emphasis on mining at the Ludwig-Maximilians-Universität München and Heidelberg University, taking the degree of Ph.D. at the Ludwig-Maximilians-Universität München in 1862. His teachers included Johann Nepomuk von Fuchs, Karl Emil von Schafhäutl, K. C. von Leonhard, H. G. Bronn, and Franz Ritter von Kobell. He was engaged for a time in the saltworks and then at the colliery of St Ingbert and as a surveyor in that district. In 1851, when the Geological Survey of Bavaria was instituted, Gümbel was appointed chief geologist. In 1853, he was appointed royal master of the mines. In 1863, he was made honorary professor of geognosy and surveying at the Ludwig-Maximilians-Universität München, and in 1879, Oberberg director of the Bavarian mining department with which the Geological Survey was incorporated.

His geological map of Bavaria appeared in 1858, and the official memoir descriptive of the detailed work, entitled Geognoslische Beschreibung des Konigreichs Bayern was issued in three parts (1861, 1868 and 1879). He subsequently published his Geologie von Bayern in 2 volumes (1884–1894), an elaborate treatise on geology, with special reference to the geology of Bavaria.

Gümbel map of the geology of Bavaria (1852)

In the course of his long and active career he engaged in much palaeontological work: he studied the fauna of the Triassic and in 1861 introduced the term Rhaetic for the uppermost division of that system; he supported at first the view of the organic nature of Eozoon canadense (1866 and 1876), he devoted special attention to Foraminifera, and described those of the Eocene strata of the northern Alps (1868); he dealt also with Receptaculites (1875) which he regarded as a genus belonging to the Foraminifera. In 1875 and 1878 he published "Über die Beschaffenheit des Steinmeteoriten vom Fall am 12. Februar 1875 in der Grafschaft Iowa Nordamerika" and "Über die in Bayern gefundenen Steinmeteoriten", respectively, both important qualitative and quantitative essays on the physical properties of meteorites.

He married Emma Wahl in 1855, and they had two sons and three daughters. A sixth child died soon after birth. He was knighted in 1882 with the Order of Merit of the Bavarian Crown. His wife died in 1883. In 1886, he married Katharina Labroisse. In 1889, he was made an honorary citizen of the city of Munich for his work on the supply of water to the city. Following his wishes he was cremated in Gotha and an urn was placed in Munich which was destroyed during World War II. The gravestone reads ''Te saxa loquuntur'' ("the stones praise you").

== Selected works ==
- "Über die Beschaffenheit des Steinmeteoriten vom Fall am 12. Februar 1875 in der Grafschaft Iowa Nordamerika", 1875 – About the Nature of the Stone Meteorites from the Fall of February 12, 1875, in the County of Iowa, North America.
- "Über die in Bayern gefundenen Steinmeteoriten", 1878 – About the Stone Meteorites Found in Bavaria.
