= Wilhelm Theodor Gümbel =

German botanist (1812–1858)

Wilhelm Theodor Gümbel (19 May 1812, in Dannenfels – 10 February 1858, in Landau in der Pfalz) was a German bryologist. He was an older brother of geologist Karl Wilhelm von Gümbel.

He studied at the University of Würzburg and the Ludwig-Maximilians-Universität München, and from 1837 taught classes in natural sciences, agriculture and technology at the vocational school in Zweibrücken. At this time, his interest in botany deepened, in particular, the morphological aspects of botany. He made the acquaintance of bryologist Philipp Bruch, and through this association, began devoting his time to the study of mosses. In 1843, he relocated as a teacher of natural sciences to the vocational school in Landau, where in 1853 he was named rector of the institution.

He was a co-founder, and for many years, a board member of the scientific association "Pollichia". The botanical genus Guembelia (family Grimmiaceae) was named after him by Georg Ernst Ludwig Hampe.

== Published works ==
He made significant contributions to Bruch and Schimper's Bryologia Europaea seu genera muscorum Europaeorum, and was the author of the following works:

- Erster Unterricht in der Thierwelt : zunächst für Gewerbschulen, 1849.
- Der Vorkeim. Beitrag zur Entwickelungsgeschichte der Moospflanze, 1853 – The prothallium. Contribution to the developmental history of the moss plant.
- Die Moosflora der Rheinpfalz, 1857 – Mosses of the Rhineland Palatinate.
- as editor: Die Vegetations-Verhältnisse des Bayerischen Waldes : nach den Grundsätzen der Pflanzengeographie (by Otto Sendtner, completed and edited by Gümbel and Ludwig Radlkofer), 1860 – Vegetation conditions of the Bavarian Forest.
