= Tannenfels Castle (Palatinate) =

Ruined hill castle in Donnersbergkreis, Germany

- Burg Tannenfels
- Dannenfels
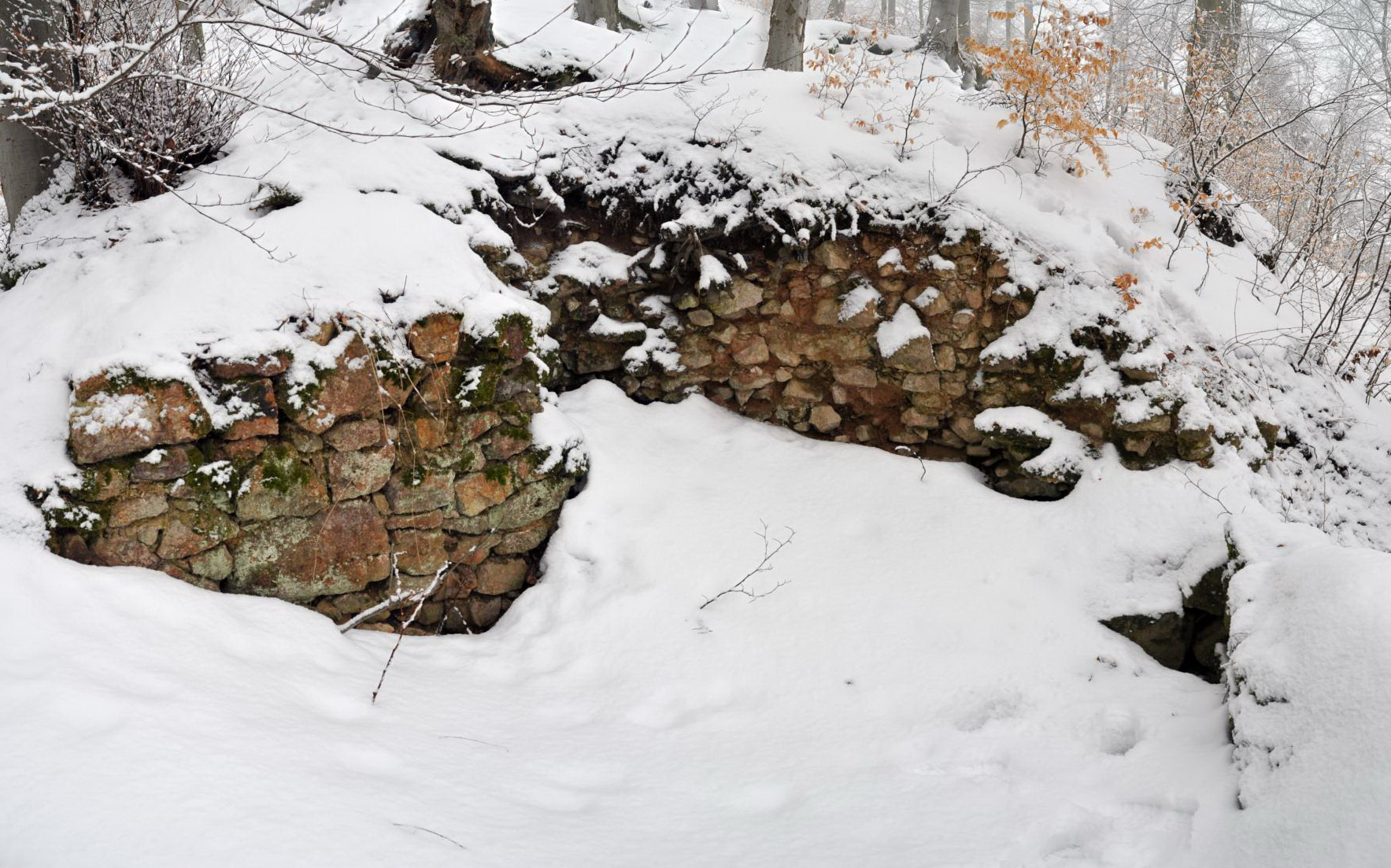
- Mauerreste

Site information
- Type: hill castle, motte
- Code: DE-RP
- Condition: wall remains

Location
- Coordinates: 49°37′44.76″N 7°56′6″E
- Height: 460 m above sea level (NN)

Site history
- Built: C. 1300

Tannenfels Castle (German: Burg Tannenfels) is a ruined hill castle of the motte and bailey type which stands at a height of 460 m above sea level (NN) above the village of Dannenfels on the Donnersberg hill in the county of Donnersbergkreis in the German state of Rhineland-Palatinate.

== History ==
Along with the Barony (Herrschaft) of Kirchheim, the castle belonged to the lords of Bolanden. In the late 13th century most of the territory was inherited by the counts of Sponheim. They founded a family line, Sponheim-Bolanden-Dannenfels, which resided here.

The motte and bailey castle is first recorded in 1330, when Count Philip of Sponheim-Bolanden-Dannenfels and his wife, Lisa of Katzenelnbogen endowed a chapel in the castle. Castellan (Burgmann) Bechtholf of Beckingen was installed in the castle in 1364. Around 1368 Henry II of Sponheim-Bolanden moved his family seat to nearby Kirchheimbolanden. After his death in 1393, the castle went via his granddaughter to the counts of Nassau-Saarbrücken. Later, in 1431, part of the estate was transferred to the counts palatine.

During the Palatine Peasants' War of 1525, the castle was completely destroyed by rebellious peasants and later demolished. The ruins remained in the ownership of the House of Nassau-Saarbrucken until 1797.

Of the old motte and bailey castle, based on a man-made bank and motte system, only a few remains of a tower, a supporting wall and a castle well have survived.

== Castle chapel ==
On 20 December 1354, Archbishop Gerlach of Mainz bestowed a benefice for the aforementioned Chapel of St. Mary, which was endowed by Philip of Sponheim-Bolanden. In a deed dated 4 January 1449 the vicar general of Mainz, Siegfried Piscator, entrusted pastoral care in this chapel to the nearby Abbey of St. James. Apparently it also served as a church for the village of Dannenfels. In a description of the Kirchheim estate in 1657 it is stated that a Protestant priest lived in Dannenfels, but he had to preach in the parsonage because there was no church in the village. It goes on: "if there had been another church before this one, it was located above in the castle, but became ruined many years ago."

== Literature ==
- Marin Dolch/Stefan Ulrich: Tannenfels. In: Jürgen Keddigkeit, Ulrich Burkhart, Rolf Übel (eds.): Pfälzisches Burgenlexikon ["Palatine Castle Lexicon"]. Vol. 4.2. Kaiserslautern, 2007. pp. 83–88
