= North Palatinate =

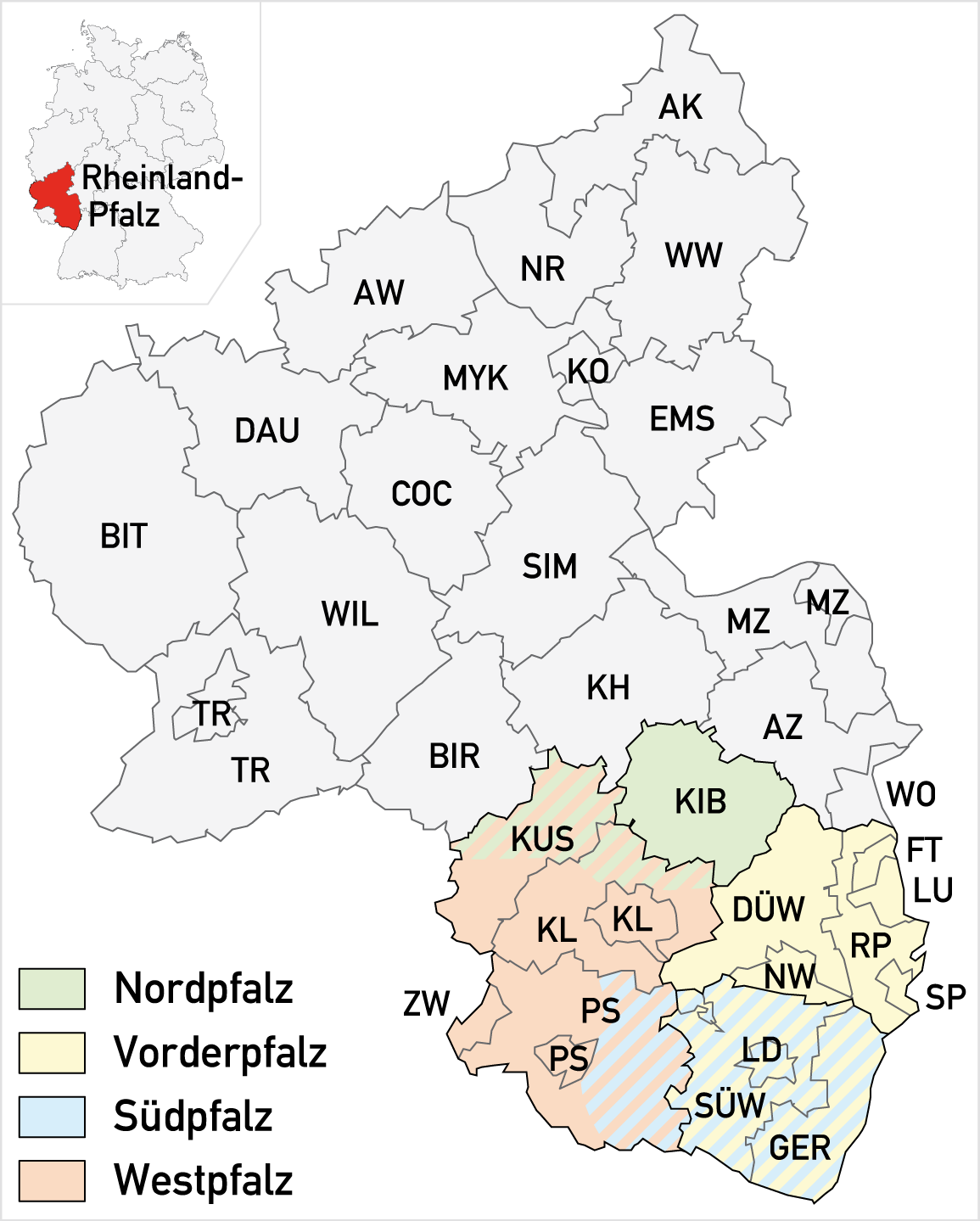
Rhineland-Palatinate showing the location of North Palatinate

North Palatinate (German: Nordpfalz) is a region in southwest Germany with an area of just 650 km^{2}, making it the smallest landscape in the Palatinate region of the German state of Rhineland-Palatinate.

== Geography ==
As its name suggests, the North Palatinate forms the northern part of the Palatinate. Almost its entire area is also part of the North Palatine Uplands, dominated by the Donnersberg massif with a height of 686.5 m above sea level (NHN).

The other regions of the Palatinate are Anterior Palatinate, South Palatinate and West Palatinate.

== Towns ==
The North Palatinate is only sparsely populated. The three largest towns all have fewer than 10,000 inhabitants:

- Eisenberg
- Kirchheimbolanden
- Rockenhausen
