= Hohenfels Castle (Palatinate) =

Castle in Germany

Burg Hohenfels
- Imsbach
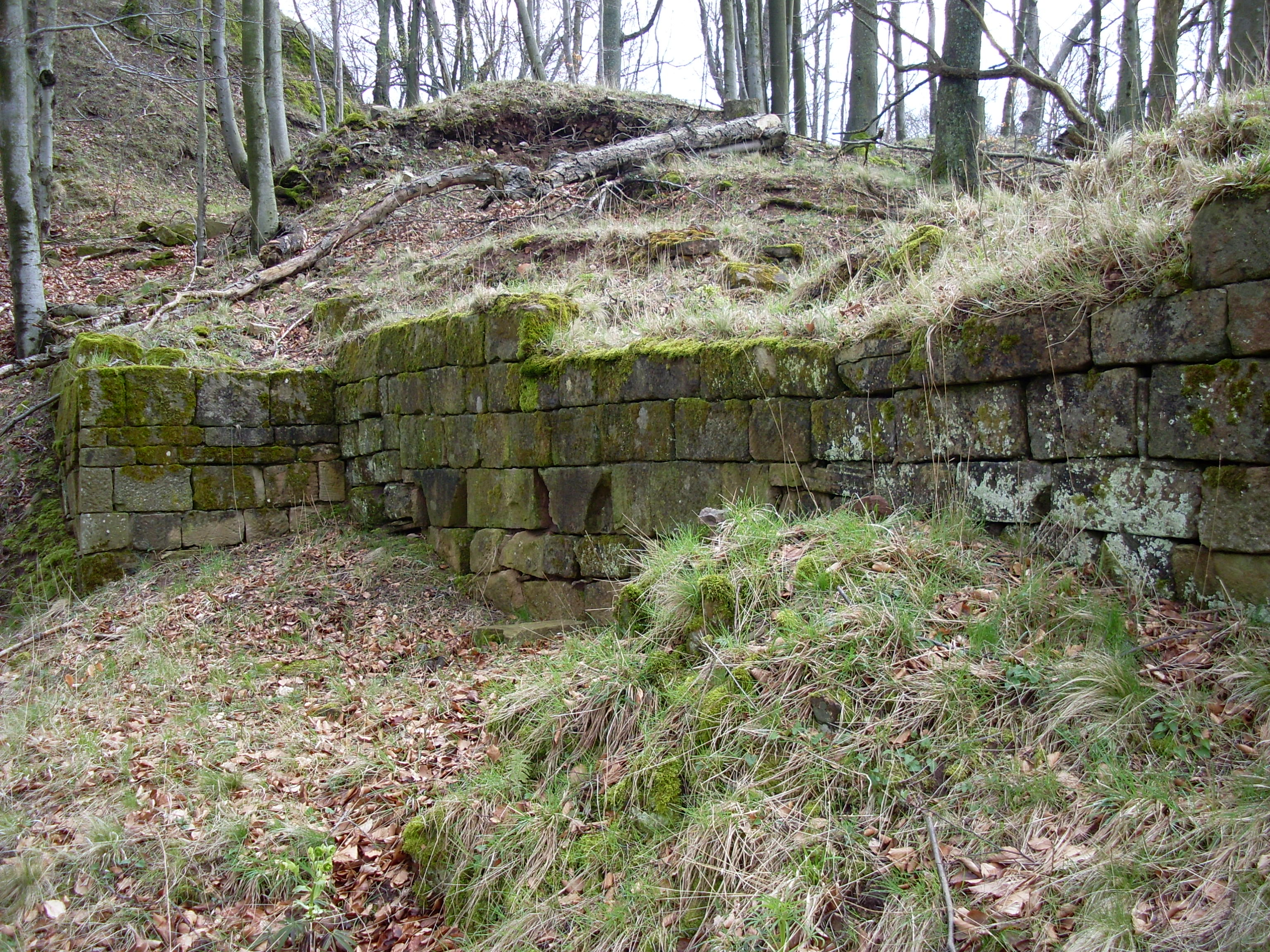
- Ruins of Hohenfels

Site information
- Type: hill castle
- Code: DE-RP
- Condition: Mauerreste

Location
- Coordinates: 49°36′06″N 7°53′35″E
- Height: 545 m above sea level (NHN)

Site history
- Built: c. 1200
- Materials: rusticated ashlar

Garrison information
- Occupants: nobility

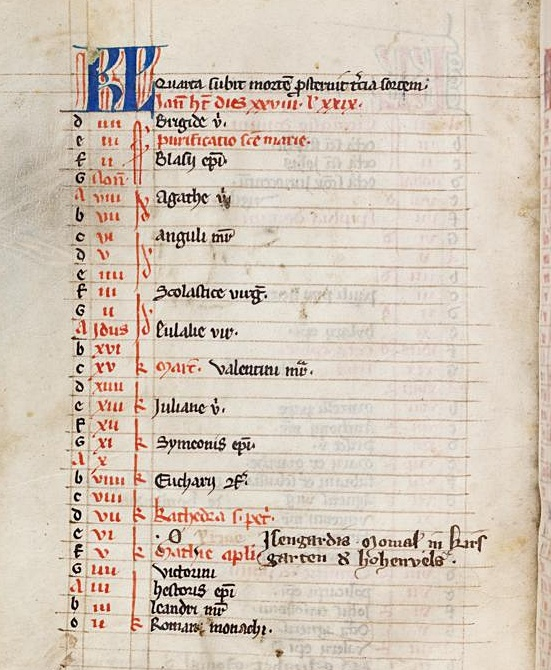
Calendar sheet for "February" from the Codex Liechtenthal 37, c. 1300, with remark about a nun from the family of Bolanden-Hohenfels who had died at Kirschgarten Abbey

Hohenfels Castle (German: Burg Hohenfels) is a ruined hill castle at a height of 545 m above sea level (NHN), in the Beutelfels Nature Reserve north of the village of Imsbach in the county of Donnersbergkreis in the German state of Rhineland-Palatinate. The castle may be reached via a steep footpath from the visitor mine of Weiße Grube in the valley of Langental. The path passes the "Iron Man" monument (Eiserner Mann).

== History ==
There are several clues that the road called in the records the Old Rockenhausen Road (alte Rockenhauser Straße), which ran from the area of Hahnweilerhof, continued past Hohenfels Castle in the direction of Falkenstein and Rockenhausen to Bad Kreuznach, had existed since Roman times. In 1820 a Roman hoard of 28 coins was found, which were dated to about the year 340 AD. Because there is also evidence of Roman mining activity in the deeply incised Langental valley, it is highly probable that there was a Roman fortification or road station in the area around Hohenfels Castle, as was common in the Late Roman period.

The assertion that, in 1128, Werner of Bolanden and his wife Guda of Hohenfels were named, and that Guda was the last member of an old Hohenfels dynasty cannot be proved by documentary evidence. It is true that, in that year and for the first time, a certain Werner of Bolanden appears in the light of history by being mentioned in a document, but his wife's name is not known. The fact is, however, that in the Bohland Fief Books (Bohlander Lehensbüchern) of the 12th century, the brothers Werner and Philip of Bolanden are mentioned as being enfeoffed with a castle, which the former Abbot of Prüm, Caesarius of Milendonk, described in 1222 in the Prüm Urbar in Latin as: bonum castrum quod Hoviles appelatur (the mining district of Imsbach had belonged since the 9th century to Prüm Abbey in the Eifel mountains). It is also the case that, in the first decades of the 13th century, the Bolanden family was divided into the lines of "Bolanden", "Falkenstein" and "Hohenfels". After that, Philip III of Bolanden-Hohenfels was owner of the castle until 1277; he was the imperial chamberlain or Reichskämmerer and "Procurator on the Middle Rhine". His sons Philip III jun. called "von Isenburg and Dietrich of Hohenfels shared the castle as co-heirs until 1290. The owners that followed, the brothers Hermann II "the Elder" and Werner of Hohenfels, lay 1333, along with others, feuded with the Imperial City of Speyer.

According to a document dated 11 July 1287, Templer Province Master Wildgrave Frederick, as well as Commander of the Templar House of Kirchheim an der Weinstraße, Henry of Hohenfels, together with his fellow knights templar, sold the parts of their estate in the parish of Laumersheim to the collegiate church of St. Martin in Worms.

== Gallery ==
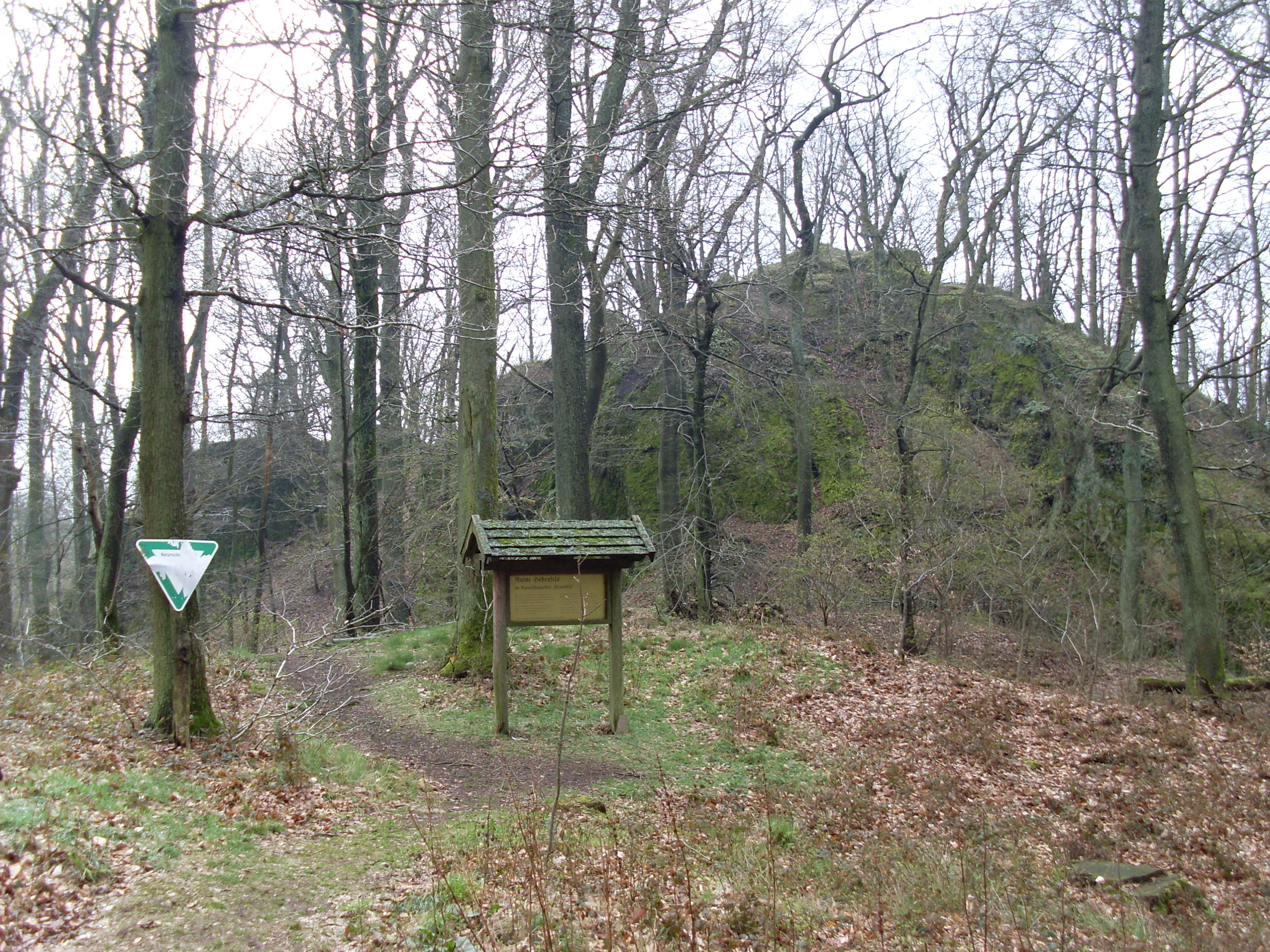
Hohenfels

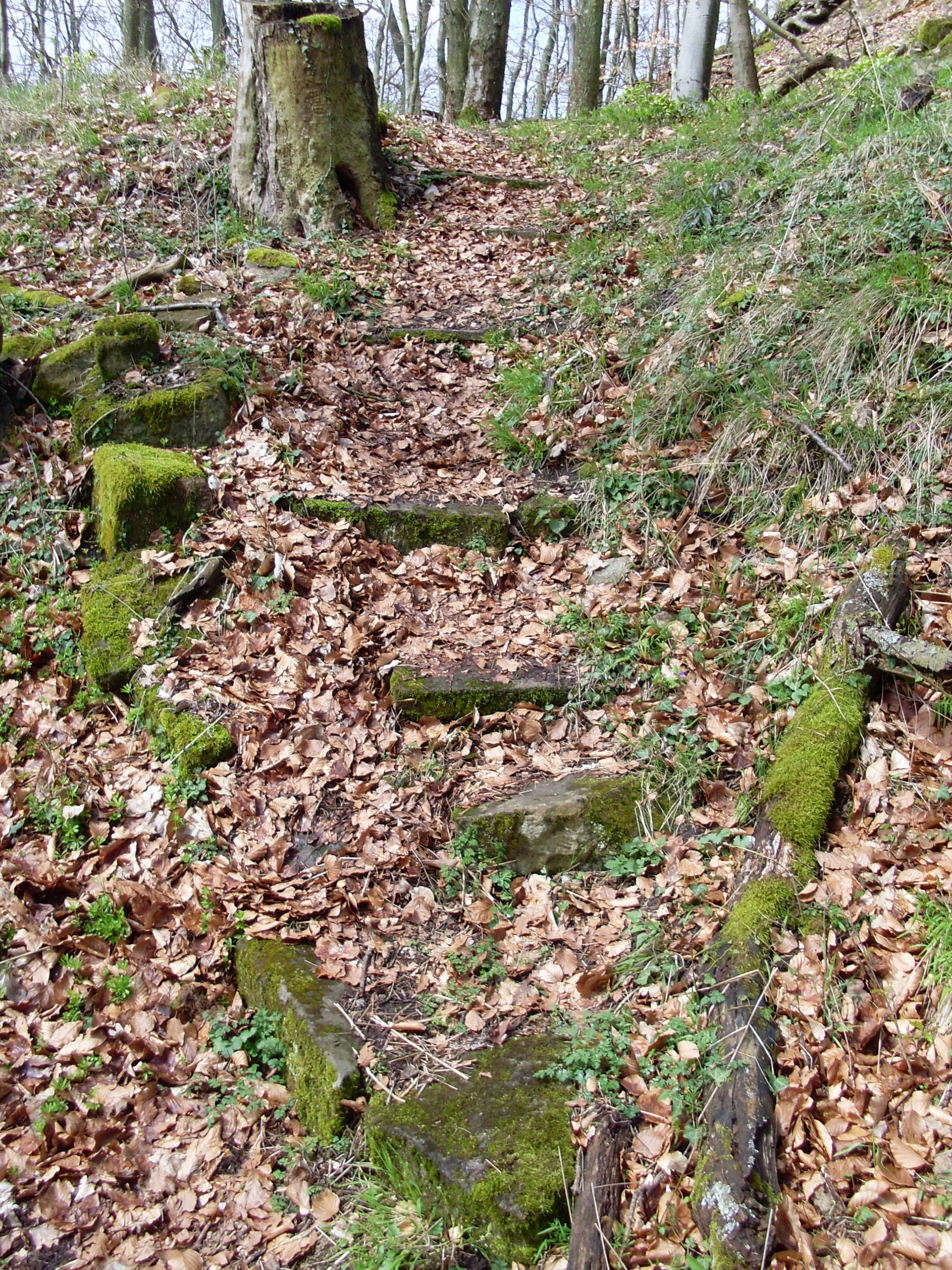
Hohenfels

== Literature ==
- Gemeinde Imsbach, ed. (1993), Imsbach. Aus der Geschichte eines nordpfälzischen Bergmanndorfes und seiner Bürger (in German), ISBN 3-926306-10-6
- Ulrich Burkhart (2002), "Hohenfels/Donnersberg", in Jürgen Keddigkeit; Alexander Thon; Rolf Übel (eds.), Pfälzisches Burgenlexikon. Bd. 2. F−H, Beiträge zur pfälzischen Geschichte (in German), vol. Bd. 12.2, Kaiserslautern, pp. 390–400, ISBN 3-927754-48-X, ISSN 0936-7640
