= Donnersberg =

Mountain in Germany

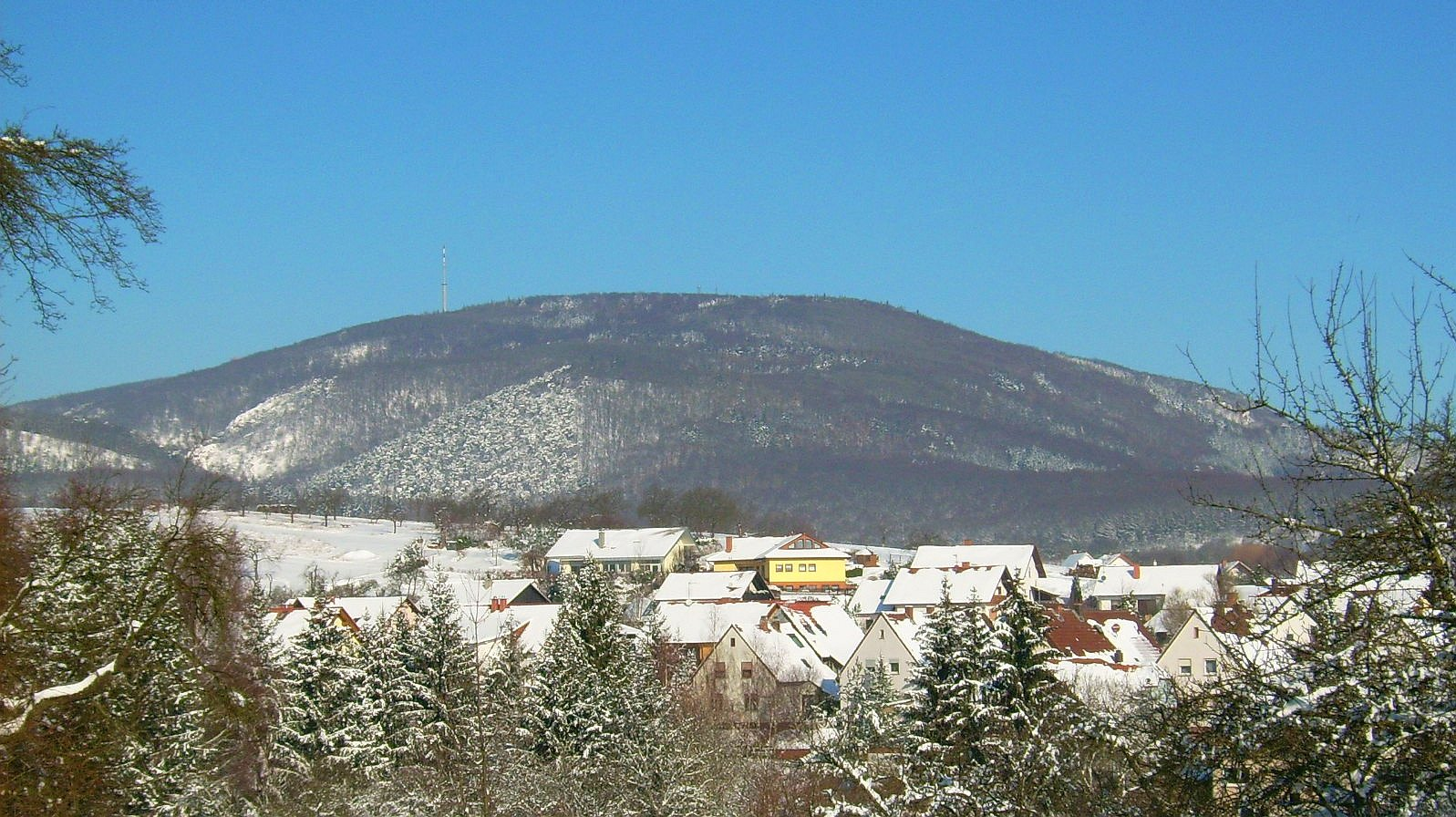
- The Donnersberg seen from Steinbach

Highest point
- Elevation: 687 m above sea level (NN) (2,254 ft)
- Listing: Highest mountain in the Palatinate; Celtic ringwork
- Coordinates: 49°37′31″N 7°54′53″E

Geography
- Location within Rhineland-Palatinate
- Location: Nordpfalz (Rheinland-Pfalz, Germany)
- Parent range: North Palatine Uplands

Geology
- Mountain type: cryptodome
- Rock type: Rhyolite

The Donnersberg (German pronunciation: [ˈdɔnɐsbɛʁk]; literally: "thunder mountain") is the highest peak of the Palatinate (German: Pfalz) region of Germany. The mountain lies between the towns of Rockenhausen and Kirchheimbolanden, in the Donnersbergkreis district, which is named after the mountain. The highway A63 runs along the southern edge of the Donnersberg. European walking route E8 runs across the mountain.

The highest point of the Donnersberg is the rock Königstuhl ("king's seat") at 687 metres above sea level. The mountain has a diameter of about 7 kilometres and covers an area of some 2,400 hectares. The Donnersberg was formed by volcanic activity during the Permian, in the transition period between the lower and upper Rotliegend strata.

The name Donnersberg is thought to refer to Donar, the Germanic god of thunder, a theory supported by the fact that the Romans dubbed the Donnersberg Mons Jovis after their god of thunder, Jupiter. According to other theories, the name of the mountain was derived from the Celtic dunum (meaning "mountain") or from the name of a Celtic deity, Taranis.

During the Celtic La Tène period, around 150 BC, an important settlement (oppidum) was built on the Donnersberg, covering some 240 hectares. Part of the wall (Keltenwall) surrounding this settlement has been reconstructed. Archeological excavations are ongoing.

In the Middle Ages, five castles surrounded the strategically placed mountain: Tannenfels, Wildenstein, Hohenfels, Falkenstein and Ruppertsecken. Today, only ruins remain of these five castles.

About 900 metres east of the Königstuhl rock, a 27 metres tall tower was constructed in 1864–1865, the Ludwigsturm. After World War II, a radio mast for the largest U.S. radio station in western Europe was placed on the Donnersberg. In the early 1960s, a new communications tower was constructed, stretching over 200 metres.

The Donnersbergbahn is a railway line that runs from Alzey to Kirchheimbolanden. The line originally ran even further, to Marnheim, but on March 20, 1945, the Pfrimm Viaduct, a railway bridge between Kirchheimbolanden and Marnheim, was destroyed by withdrawing German troops, and it has not been rebuilt since.

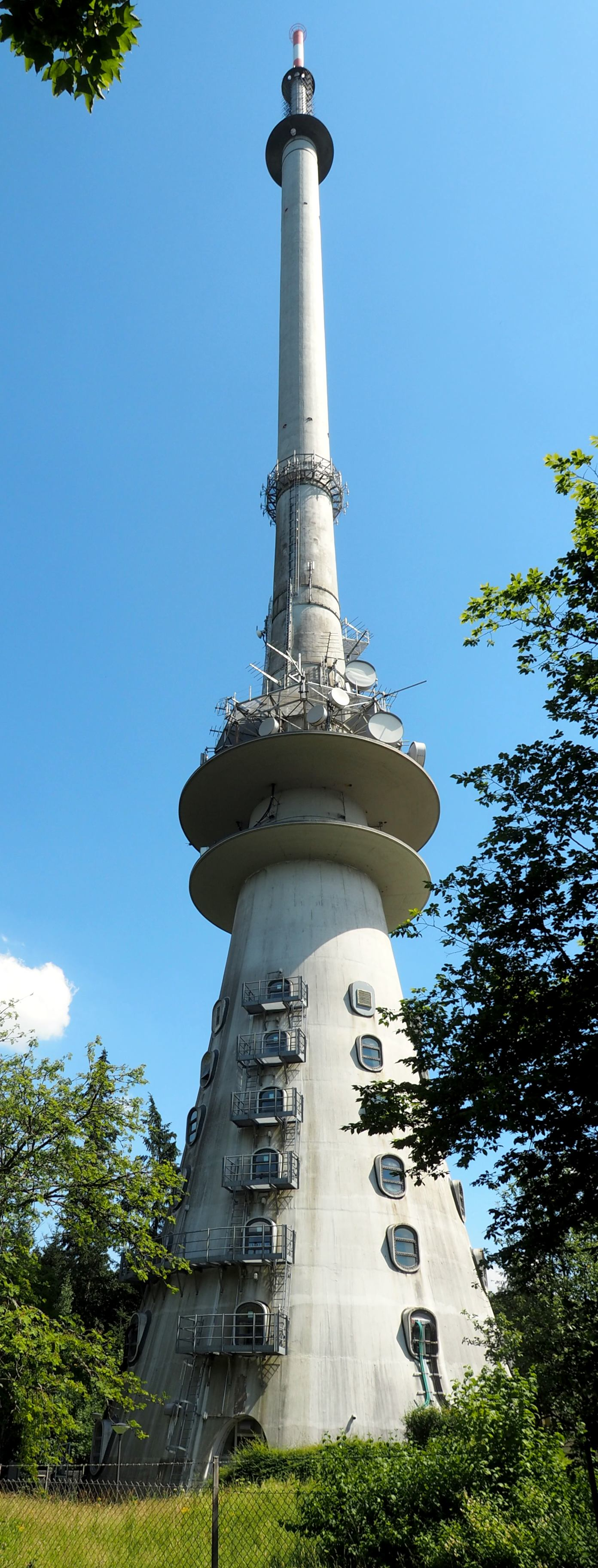
the radio and TV tower on top of Donnersberg

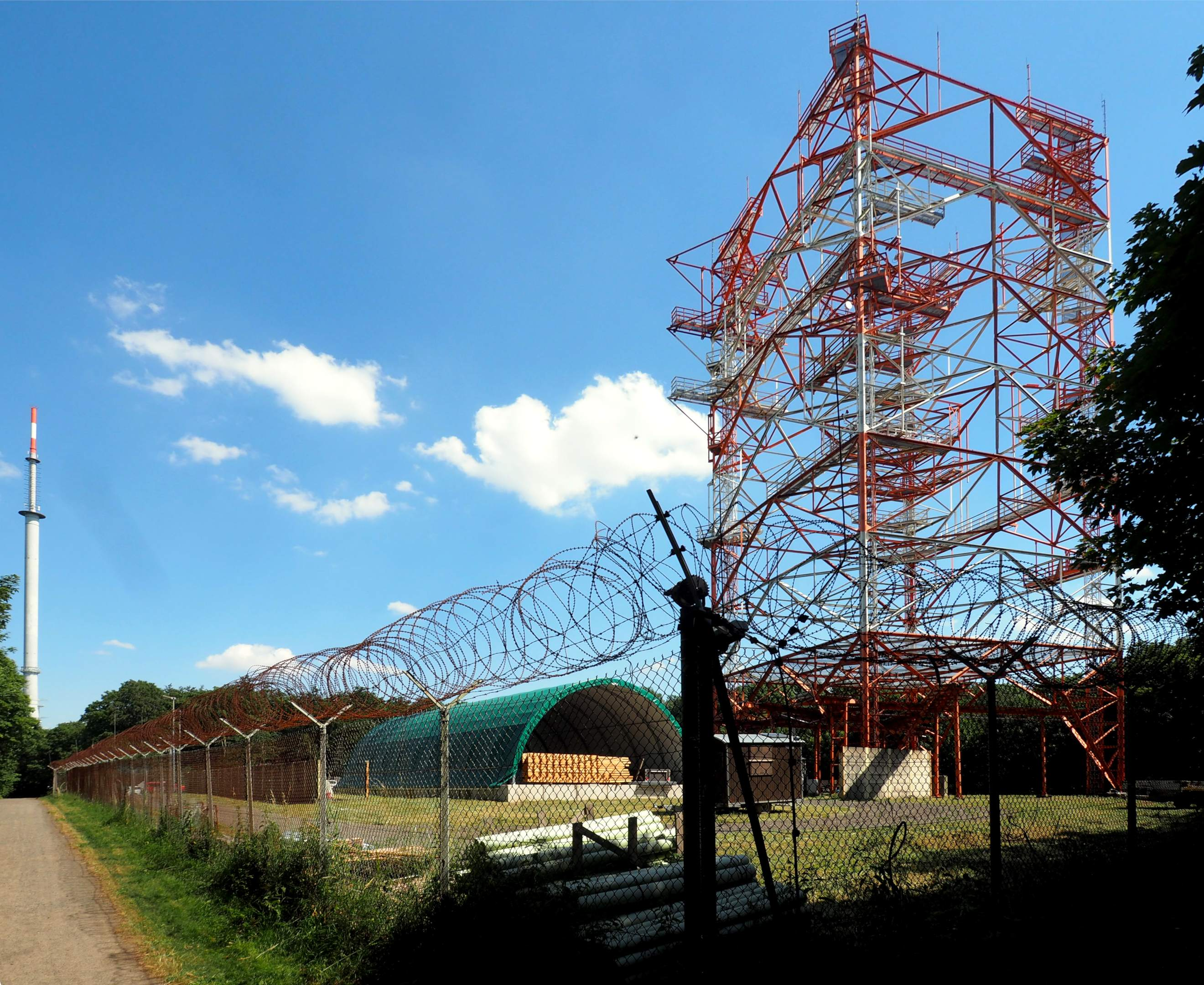
former U.S. radio mast nearby

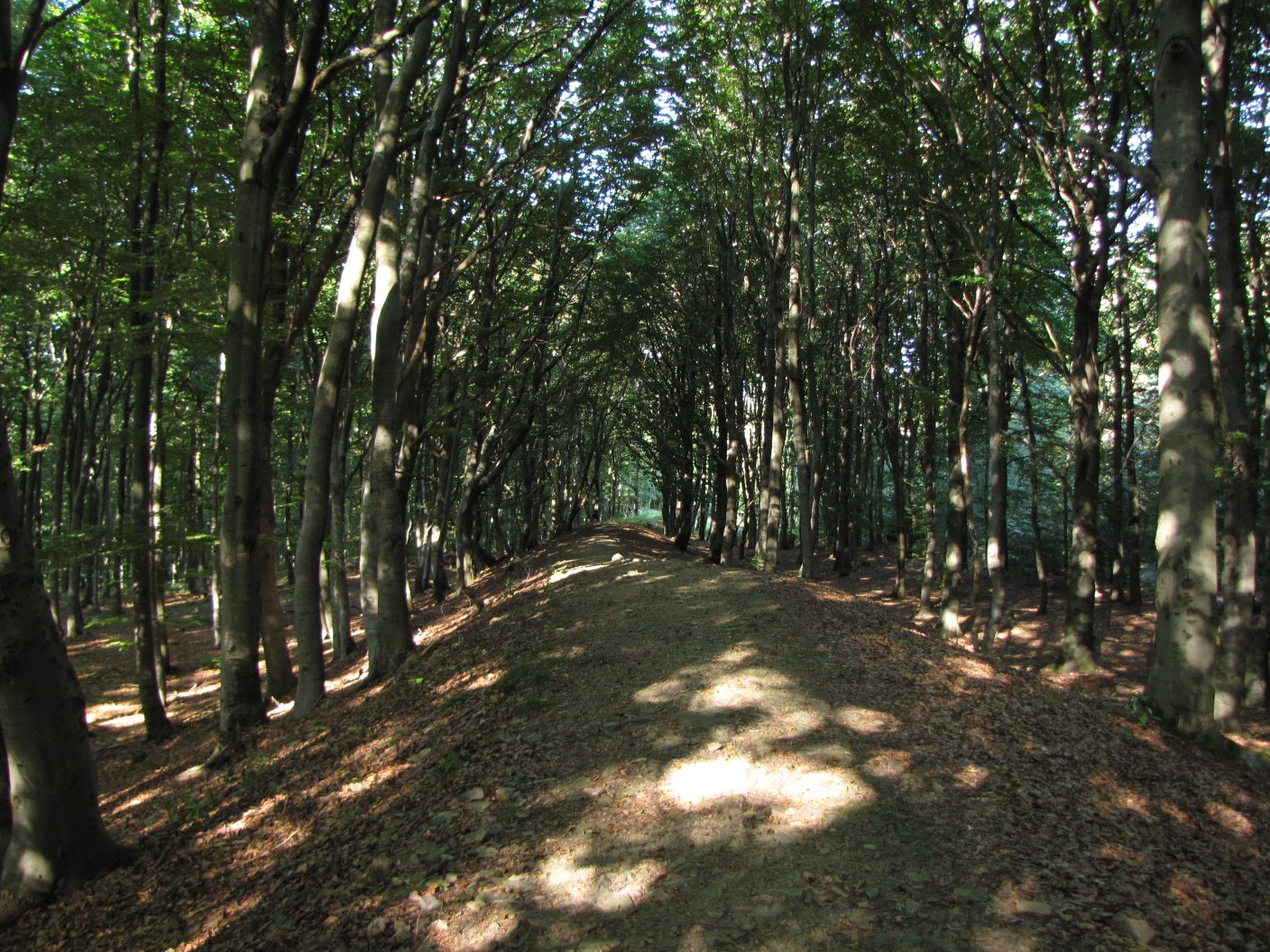
Earthworks of the Celtic Hill fort

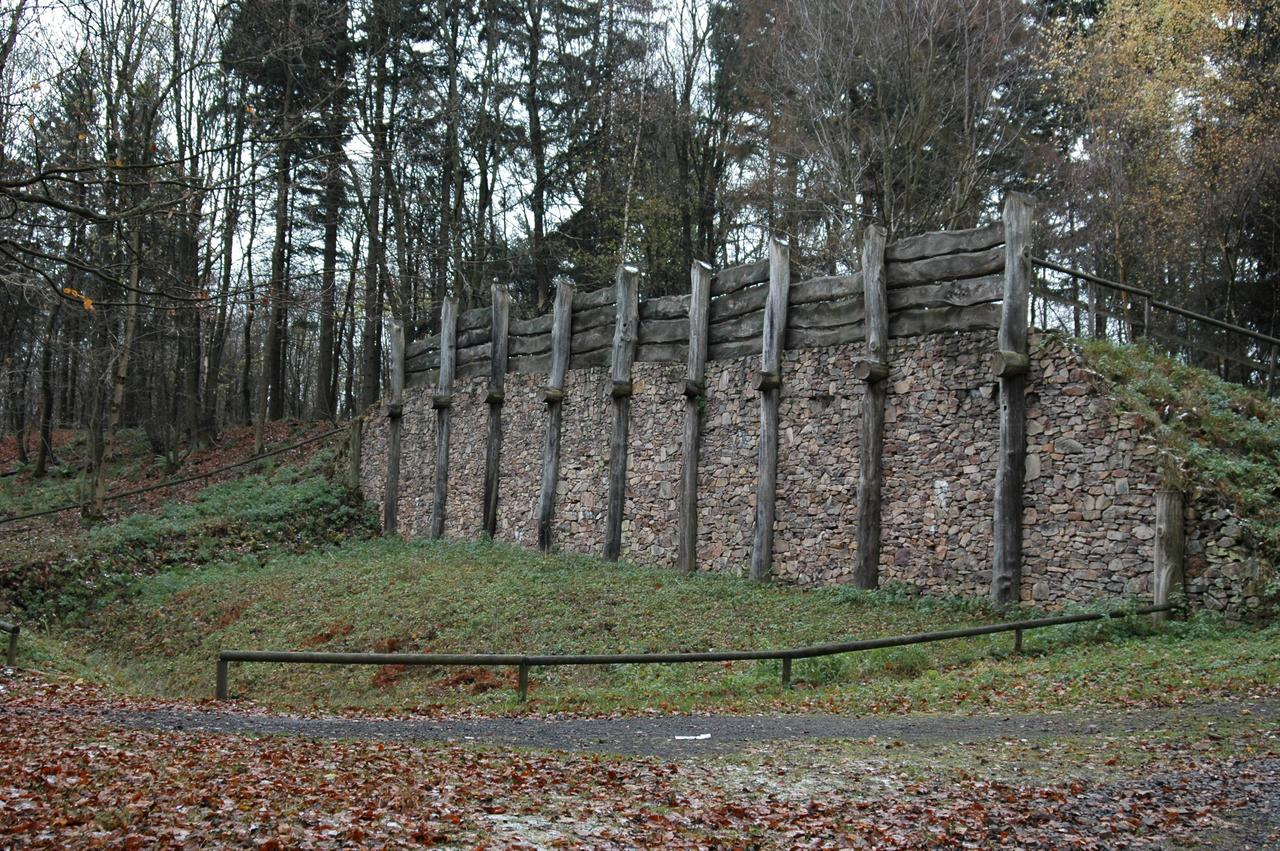
Recoonstructed Celtic fortification wall at the hillfort

Reconstructed Celtic buildings at the hillfort

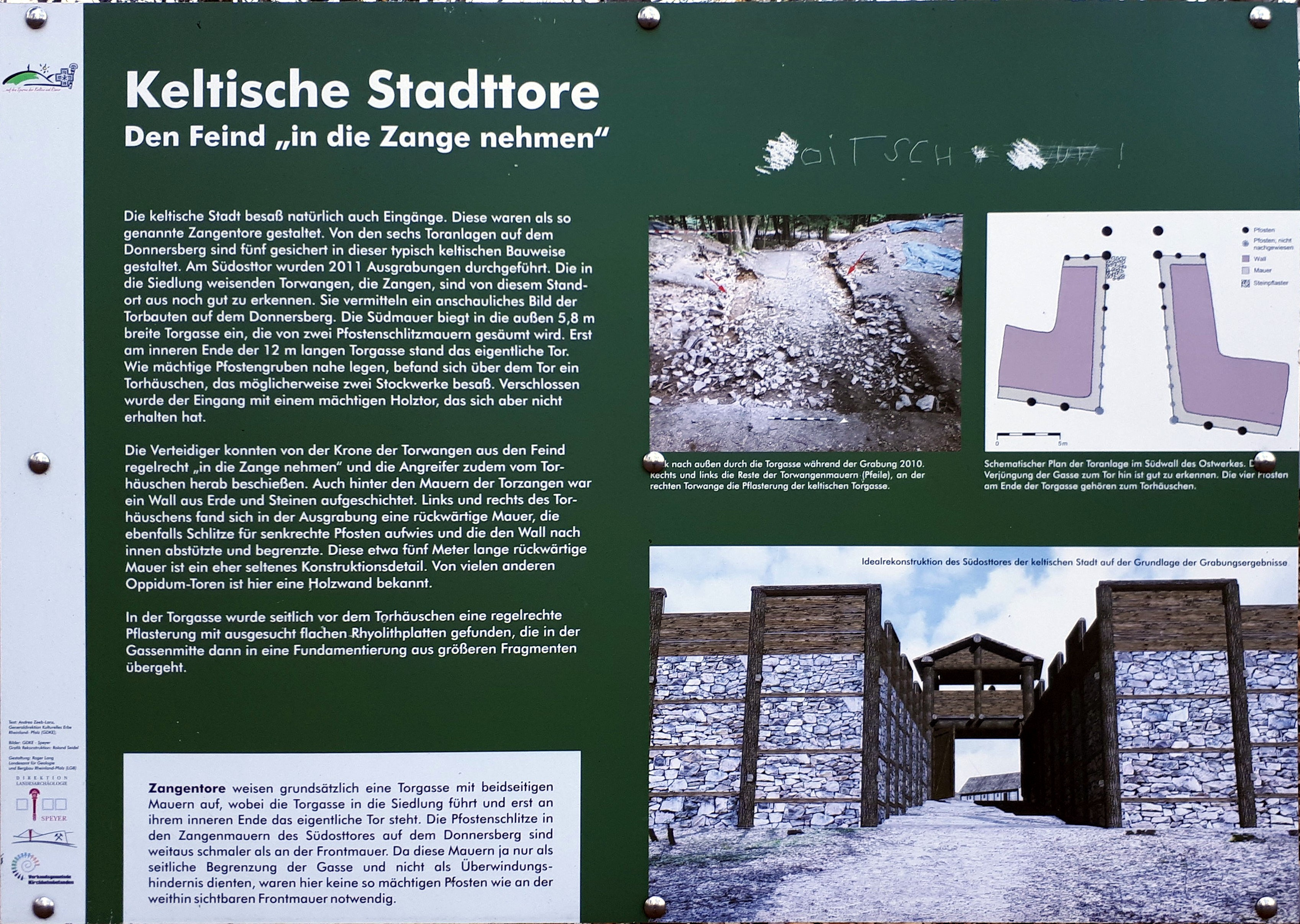
Information board with digital reconstruction of the oppidum

== Sources ==
- Donnersbergverein für Mensch und Natur: Der Donnersberg (German)
- Dannenfels am Donnersberg: Donnersberg: Geologie (German)
