= Steinbach am Donnersberg =

- Municipality
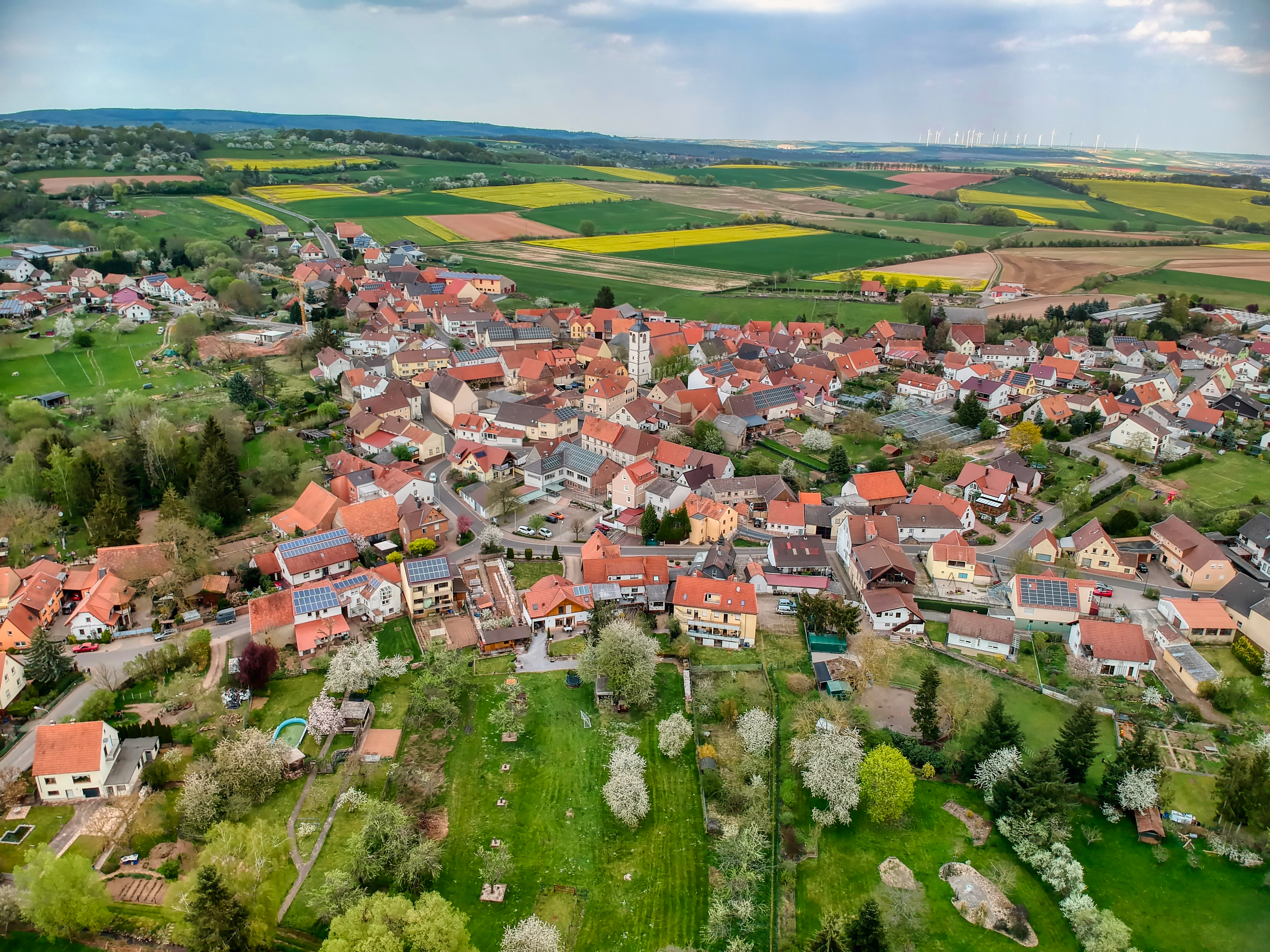
- aerial view

- Coat of arms

- Location of Steinbach am Donnersberg within Donnersbergkreis district
- Interactive map of Steinbach am Donnersberg
- Location within Germany Location within Rhineland-Palatinate
- Coordinates: 49°35′51.80″N 7°57′21.88″E
- Country: Germany
- State: Rhineland-Palatinate
- District: Donnersbergkreis
- Municipal assoc.: Winnweiler

Government
  - Mayor (2019–24): Dirk Schneider

Area
  - Total: 4.43 km^{2} (1.71 sq mi)
- Elevation: 274 m (899 ft)

Population (2025-12-31)
  - Total: 675
  - Density: 152/km^{2} (395/sq mi)
- Time zone: UTC+01:00 (CET)
  - Summer (DST): UTC+02:00 (CEST)
- Postal codes: 67808
- Dialling codes: 06357
- Vehicle registration: KIB
- Website: www.steinbach-am-donnersberg.de

Steinbach am Donnersberg (German pronunciation: [ˈʃtaɪnbax ʔam ˈdɔnɐsbɛʁk], lit. 'Steinbach on the Donnersberg') is a municipality in the Donnersbergkreis district, in Rhineland-Palatinate, Germany. The current mayor is Susanne Röß, elected in 2019.
