= Royal mistress =

Semi-official position at court

A royal mistress is the historical position and sometimes unofficial title of the extramarital lover of a monarch or an heir apparent, who was expected to provide certain services, such as sexual or romantic intimacy, companionship, and advice in return for security, titles, money, honours, and an influential place at the royal court. Thus, some royal mistresses have had considerable power, being the power behind the throne. The institution partly owes its prevalence to the fact that royal marriages used to be conducted solely on the basis of political and dynastic considerations, leaving little space for the monarch's personal preferences in the choice of a partner.

The title of royal mistress was never official, and most mistresses had an official reason to be at the court, such as being a lady-in-waiting or maid-of-honour to a female member of the royal family or a governess to the royal children. However, their real position was most often an open secret, and there was no real division between formal and informal political power in the early French court. From the 15th century onward and most importantly in France, chief mistresses gained a semi-official title (French: maîtresse-en-titre, literally "official mistress"), which came with its own assigned apartments in the palace. A chief mistress was also sometimes called a maîtresse déclarée, or "declared mistress". An unacknowledged, less important royal lover was known as a petite maîtresse ("little mistress").

In Europe, the children of mistresses were typically not included in the line of succession, except when secret marriages were alleged. They were however regularly given titles and high positions in the court or the army.

== Lists of royal mistresses ==
- List of French royal mistresses
- List of Russian royal mistresses and lovers
- List of Swedish royal mistresses

== Austria ==
- Margareta von Edelsheim (d. 1522) and Anna von Helfenstein, mistresses of Maximilian I
- Johanna van der Gheynst (1505–1541) and Barbara Blomberg (1527–1597), mistresses of Charles V
- Kateřina Stradová (1568–1629), mistress of Rudolf II
- Maria Wilhelmina von Neipperg (1738–1775), mistress of Francis I
- Livia Raimondi, mistress of Leopold II
- Katharina Schratt (1853–1940) and Anna Nahowski (1860–1930), mistresses of Franz Joseph I
- Mizzi Kaspar (1864–1907) and Baroness Mary Vetsera (1871–1889), mistresses of Crown Prince Rudolf

== Belgium ==
- Caroline Bauer (1807–1877) and Arcadie Claret (1826–1897), mistresses of Leopold I
- Caroline Lacroix (1883–1948), mistress of Leopold II
- Sybille de Selys Longchamps (born 1941), mistress of Albert II

== Denmark ==
- Helena Guttormsdotter (fl. 1205), mistress of Valdemar II
- Cecilia (d. aft. 1459), mistress and later wife of Eric of Pomerania
- Edele Jernskjæg (d. 1512), mistress of John I
- Dyveke Sigbritsdatter (1490–1517), mistress of Christian II
- Karen Andersdatter (d. 1673), Vibeke Kruse (d. 1648) and Kirsten Madsdatter (d. 1629), mistresses of Christian IV
- Anne Lykke (1595–1641), mistress of Crown Prince Christian
- Margrethe Pape (1620–1684), mistress of Frederick III
- Sophie Amalie Moth (1654–1719), mistress of Christian V
- Charlotte Helene von Schindel (1690–1752), mistress of Frederick IV
- Charlotte Amalie Winge (fl. 1766) and Else Hansen (1720–1784), mistresses of Frederick V
- Støvlet-Cathrine (1745–1805), mistress of Christian VII
- Frederikke Dannemand (1792–1862), mistress of Frederick VI
- Louise Rasmussen (1815–1874), mistress and later wife of Frederick VII

== Egypt ==
- Bilistiche (b. 280 BCE), mistress of Ptolemy II Philadelphus
- Agathoclea (247–202/3 BCE), mistress of Ptolemy IV Philopator
- Barbara Skelton (1918–1996), mistress of Farouk

== Germany ==
- Bianca Lancia (1210–1248), mistress and possible last wife of Frederick II, Holy Roman Emperor
- Clara Elisabeth von Platen (1648–1700), mistress of Ernest Augustus, Elector of Hanover
- Magdalena Sibylla of Neidschutz (1675–1694), mistress of John George IV, Elector of Saxony
- Wilhelmine Dorothee von der Marwitz (1718–1787), mistress of Frederick, Margrave of Brandenburg-Bayreuth
- Katharina Werner, mistress of Louis I, Grand Duke of Baden
- Karoline Jagemann (1777–1848), mistress of Karl August, Grand Duke of Saxe-Weimar-Eisenach

=== Bavaria ===
- Aleid van Poelgeest (1370–1392), mistress of Albert I, Duke of Bavaria
- Agnes Le Louchier (1660–1717), mistress of Maximilian II Emanuel, Elector of Bavaria
- Maria Caroline Charlotte von Ingenheim (1704–1749), mistress of Charles VII, Holy Roman Emperor
- Josepha von Heydeck (1748–1771), mistress of Charles Theodore, Elector of Bavaria
- Diana Rabe von Pappenheim (1788–1844), mistress of Jérôme Bonaparte
- Lola Montez (1821–1861), mistress of Ludwig I of Bavaria
- Jane Digby (1807–1881), mistress of Ludwig I of Bavaria and his son Otto of Greece

=== Brunswick ===
- Eva von Trott (1505–1567), mistress of Henry V, Duke of Brunswick-Lüneburg
- Anna Rumschottel (fl. 1528), mistress of Eric I, Duke of Brunswick-Lüneburg
- Éléonore Desmier d'Olbreuse (1639–1722), mistress and later wife of George William, Duke of Brunswick
- Maria Antonia Branconi (1746–1793), mistress of Charles William Ferdinand, Duke of Brunswick

=== Hesse ===
- Barbara Christine von Bernhold (1690–1756), mistress of Charles I, Landgrave of Hesse-Kassel
- Helena Martini (1728–1803), mistress of Louis VIII, Landgrave of Hesse-Darmstadt
- Charlotte Christine Buissine (1749–1781), Rosa Dorothea Ritter (1759–1833), and Karoline von Schlotheim (1766–1847), mistresses of William I, Elector of Hesse

=== Prussia ===
- Catharina von Wartenberg (1674–1734), mistress of Frederick I
- Wilhelmine, Gräfin von Lichtenau (1753–1820), mistress of Frederick William II

=== Württemberg ===
- Wilhelmine von Grävenitz (1684–1744), mistress and bigamous wife of Erbhard Louis
- Countess Franziska von Hohenheim (1748–1811), mistress and wife of Charles Eugene

== Italy ==
- Rotruda of Pavia (d. 945), mistress of Hugh of Italy
- Isabella Boschetti (b. 1502), mistress of Federico II Gonzaga, Duke of Mantua
- Claudia Colla (d. 1611), mistress of Ranuccio I Farnese, Duke of Parma

=== Ferrara ===
- Stella de' Tolomei (d. 1419), mistress of Niccolò III d'Este, Marquis of Ferrara
- Laura Dianti (d. 1573), mistress of Alfonso I d'Este, Duke of Ferrara

=== Florence ===
- Lucrezia Donati (1447–1501), mistress of Lorenzo de' Medici
- Fioretta Gorini (1453–1478), mistress of Giuliano de' Medici
- Taddea Malaspina (1505–1559), mistress of Alessandro de' Medici, Duke of Florence
- Bianca Cappello (1548–1587), mistress and later wife of Francesco I de' Medici, Grand Duke of Tuscany

=== Milan ===
- Agnese del Maino (1411–1465), mistress of Duke Filippo Maria Visconti
- Giovanna d'Acquapendente, mistress of Duke Francesco I Sforza
- Lucrezia Landriani, mistress of duke Galeazzo Maria Sforza

=== Naples ===
- Lucrezia d'Alagno (1430–1479), mistress of Alfonso V of Aragon
- Trogia Gazzella (1460–1511), mistress of Alfonso II of Naples

=== Savoy ===
- Jeanne Baptiste d'Albert de Luynes (1670–1736), mistress of Victor Amadeus II
- Anna Canalis di Cumiana (1680–1769), mistress and later wife of Victor Amadeus II
- Laura Bon (1825–1904), mistress of Victor Emmanuel II
- Rosa Vercellana (1833–1885), mistress and later wife of Victor Emmanuel II
- Eugenia Attendolo Bolognini (1837–1914), mistress of Umberto I of Italy

== Norway ==
- Tora Mosterstong, mistress of Harold Fairhair, mother of Haakon the Good
- Borghild Olavsdotter (fl.1115), mistress of Sigurd the Crusader
- Bjaðǫk, 12th century mistress of Harald Gille, mother of Eystein II of Norway
- Inga of Varteig (1183/85–1234/45), mistress of Haakon III, mother of Haakon IV

== Poland ==
- Sulisława (d. 1294) mistress and later wife of Mestwin II, Duke of Pomerania
- Esterka mistress of Casimir III the Great. He married another mistress: Krystyna Rokiczana (d.1365)
- Katarzyna Telniczanka (1480–1528), mistress of Sigismund I the Old
- Barbara Radziwiłł (1520–1551), mistress and later wife of Sigismund II Augustus
- Urszula Meyerin (1570–1635), mistress of Sigismund III Vasa
- Jadwiga Łuszkowska (1616–1648) and Rozyna Małgorzata von Eckenberg (1625–1648), mistresses of Władysław IV Vasa
- Marie Françoise Catherine de Beauvau-Craon (1711–1786), mistress of Stanisław Leszczyński
- Magdalena Agnieszka Sapieżyna (1739–1790) mistress, and Elżbieta Szydłowska (1748–1810), possible wife of Stanisław August Poniatowski

=== Augustus II the Strong ===
- 1694–1696 Countess Maria Aurora von Königsmarck
- 1696–1699 Countess Anna Aloysia Maximiliane von Lamberg
- 1698–1704 Ursula Katharina of Altenbockum, later Princess of Teschen
- 1701–1706 Maria Aurora von Spiegel
- 1704–1713 Anna Constantia von Brockdorff, later Countess of Cosel
- 1706–1707 Henriette Rénard
- 1708 Angélique Debargues, French dancer and actress
- 1713–1719 Maria Magdalena of Bielinski, Countess of Dönhoff then Princess Lubomirska
- 1720–1721 Erdmuthe Sophie of Dieskau and of Loß
- 1721–1722 Baroness Kristiane of Osterhausen and of Stanisławski

== Portugal ==
- Madragana (b.1230), mistress of Afonso III
- Inês de Castro (1325–1355), mistress and later wife of Peter I
- Teresa Lourenço (b.1330), mistress of Peter I, mother of John I
- Inês Peres, mistress of John I
- Maria Soares da Cunha, mistress of Alfonso V
- Brites Anes (b.1460) and Ana de Mendonça (1460–1542), mistresses of John II
- Francisca Clara da Silva and Maria da Cruz Mascarenhas, mistresses of Peter II
- Paula de Odivelas (1701–1768) and Luísa Clara de Portugal (1702–1779), mistresses of John V
- Domitila de Castro, Marchioness of Santos (1797–1867), mistress of Pedro I of Brazil
- Gaby Deslys (1881–1920), mistress of Manuel II

== Romania ==
- Doamna Velica (fl. 1601), mistress of Michael the Brave
- Marițica Bibescu (1815–1869), mistress and later wife of Gheorghe Bibescu, Prince of Wallachia
- Elena Văcărescu, (1864–1947), mistress of Ferdinand I
- Magda Lupescu (1899–1977), mistress and later wife of Carol II.

== Spain ==
- Aldonza Ruiz de Ivorra (1454–1513), mistress of Ferdinand II of Aragon
- Isabel Osorio (1522–1589) and Eufrasia de Guzmán (fl.1592), mistresses of Philip II
- María Calderón (1605–1678) and María Manrique, mistresses of Philip IV
- María del Pilar Acedo y Sarriá (1784–1869), mistress of Joseph Bonaparte
- Elena Sanz (1844–1898), mistress of Alfonso XII
- Carmen Ruiz Moragas (1898–1936), mistress of Alfonso XIII
- Bárbara Rey (b.1950) and Corinna zu Sayn-Wittgenstein-Sayn (b.1964) mistress of Juan Carlos I

=== Castile and León ===
- Jimena Muñoz (d. 1128), mistress of Alfonso VI of León and Castile
- Gontrodo Pérez (1105–1186), mistress of Alfonso VII of León and Castile
- Rahel la Fermosa (1165–1195), mistress of Alfonso VIII of Castile
- Urraca López de Haro (1160–1230), mistress and later wife of Ferdinand II of León
- Aldonza Martínez de Silva (d. 1236), mistress of Alfonso IX of León
- Mayor Guillén de Guzmán (1205–1262), mistress of Alfonso X of Castile
- Eleanor de Guzmán (1310–1351), mistress of Alfonso XI of Castile
- María de Padilla (1334–1361), mistress and posthumous wife of Peter of Castile

== Sweden ==
- Hedvig Taube (1714–1744), mistress of king Frederick I of Sweden

== United Kingdom ==
- Ehrengard Melusine von der Schulenburg, mistress of George I
- Henrietta Howard, mistress of George II
- Dorothea Jordan, mistress of William IV before his marriage and accession
- Freda Dudley Ward and Thelma, Viscountess Furness, mistresses of Edward VIII
- Camilla Shand, mistress, and later wife and, queen consort of Charles III

=== George IV ===
- Maria Fitzherbert
- Mary Robinson
- Frances Twysden
- Grace Elliott
- Isabella Seymour-Conway, Marchioness of Hertford
- Elizabeth Conyngham, Marchioness Conyngham

=== Edward VII ===
- Hortense Schneider
- Giulia Beneni
- Susan Pelham-Clinton
- Lillie Langtry
- Daisy Greville, Countess of Warwick
- Agnes Keyser
- Alice Keppel
- Lady Randolph Churchill

== Other countries ==
- Eudokia Angelina (1173–1211), mistress and later Empress of Alexios V Doukas of Byzantium.
- Agnes of Kuenring (c. 1236 – fl. 1261), mistress of Ottokar II of Bohemia
- Barbara Edelpöck (d. 1495), mistress of Matthias Corvinus of Hungary
- Angelitha Wass (d. aft. 1521), mistress of Louis II of Hungary and Bohemia
- Marietta de Patras (d. 1503), mistress of John II of Cyprus
- Fotini Mavromichali (1826–1878), mistress of Otto of Greece
- Émilie Ambre (1849–1898), mistress of William III of the Netherlands
- Katarina Konstantinović (1848–1910), mistress of her cousin Mihailo Obrenović, Prince of Serbia
- Draga Mašin (1867–1903), mistress and later wife of Alexander I of Serbia
- Marie Juliette Louvet (1867–1930), mistress of Louis II of Monaco

== See also ==
- Concubinage
- Favourite
- Legitimacy (family law)
- Maîtresse-en-titre
- Royal bastard
