= Princess Wilhelmine Caroline of Denmark =

Wilhelmine Caroline of Denmark and Norway
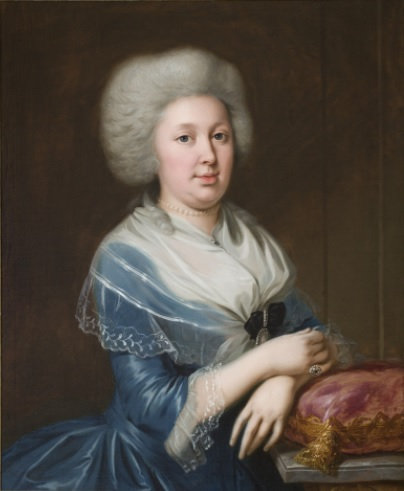
- Portrait by Johann Heinrich Tischbein

Landgravine consort of Hesse-Kassel
- Tenure: 31 October 1785 – 1803

Electress consort of Hesse
- Tenure: 1803 – 14 January 1820
- Born: 10 July 1747; Christiansborg Palace, Copenhagen, Denmark
- Died: 14 January 1820 (aged 72); Kassel, Electorate of Hesse, German Confederation
- Spouse: William I, Elector of Hesse (m. 1764)
- Issue: Maria Frederica, Duchess of Anhalt-Bernburg; Caroline Amalie, Duchess of Saxe-Gotha-Altenburg; Frederick; William II, Elector of Hesse
Names
- Danish: Vilhelmina Caroline; German: Wilhelmina Karolina
- House: Oldenburg
- Father: Frederick V of Denmark
- Mother: Louise of Great Britain
- Religion: Lutheranism

Princess Wilhelmine Caroline of Denmark and Norway (Danish: Vilhelmina Karoline, German: Wilhelmina Karolina) (10 July 1747 in Christiansborg Palace, Copenhagen – 14 January 1820 in Kassel), was the Landgravine consort of Hesse-Kassel and later the Electress of Hesse-Kassel by marriage to William I, Elector of Hesse.

== Life ==
=== Early life ===
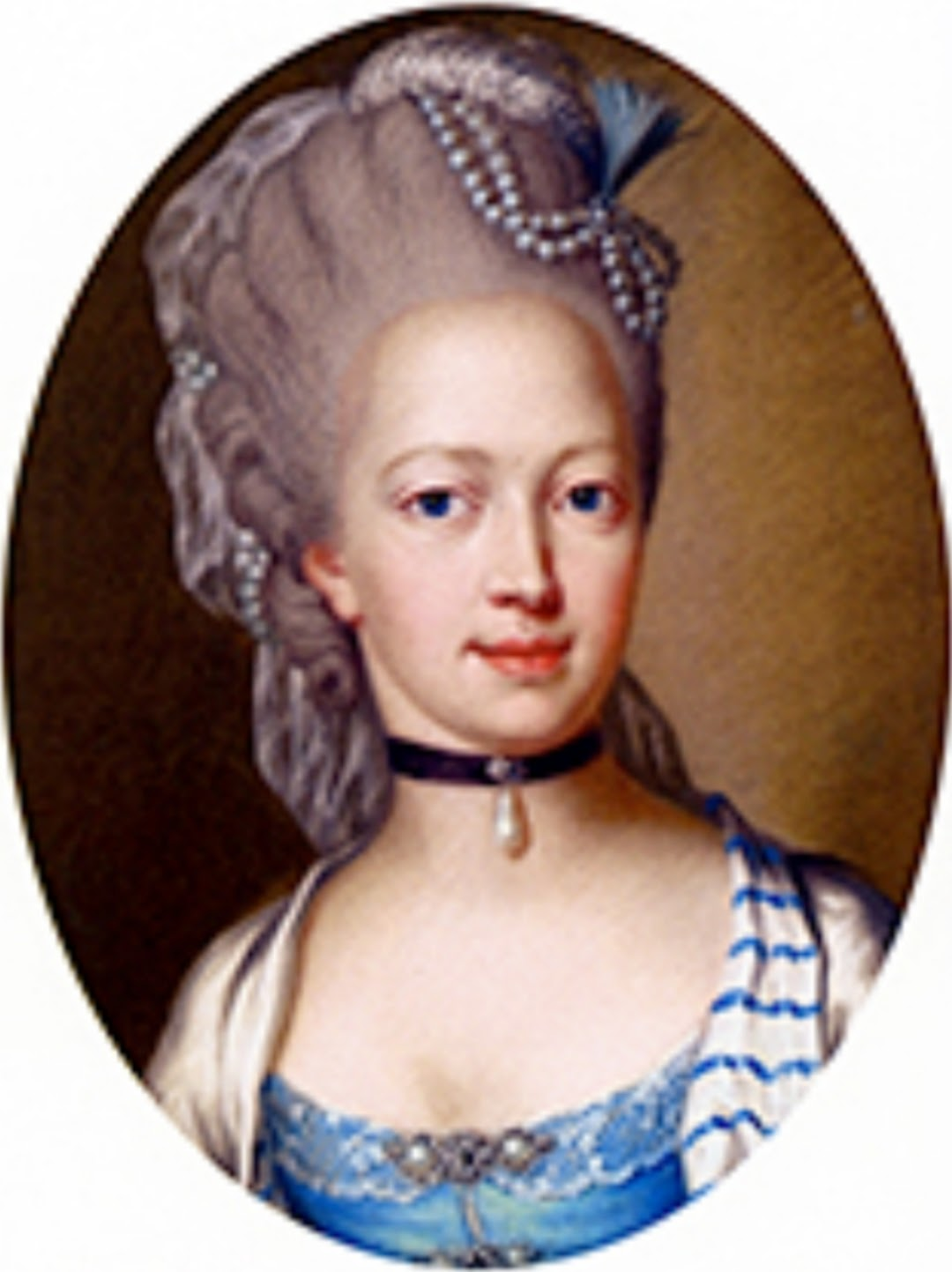
Princess Wilhelmina Caroline of Denmark

Princess Wilhelmina Caroline was born on 10 July 1747 at Christiansborg Palace, the recently completed principal residence of the Danish Monarchy on the island of Slotsholmen in central Copenhagen. She was the third child and second daughter of King Frederick V of Denmark, and his first spouse Queen Louise, daughter of King George II of Great Britain. She was born just under a year after her father had ascended the Danish throne.

At birth, Wilhelmina Caroline had an elder sister, Princess Sophia Magdalena, and the family was joined by a son Crown Prince Christian in 1749 and another daughter, Princess Louise in 1750. In 1751, four years after Wilhelmina Caroline's birth, her mother Queen Louise died during her sixth pregnancy, at the age of 27. The following year, her father married Duchess Juliana Maria of Brunswick-Wolfenbüttel, who gave birth to Wilhelmina Caroline's half-brother, Prince Frederick in 1753.

Already during her childhood, it was decided that she should marry her first cousin Hereditary Prince William of Hesse-Kassel when they became adults. Prince William's mother Mary of Great Britain and her mother Louise were sisters, and Wilhelmina Caroline and William grew up together from 1756, after Mary, who was estranged from her husband, Landgrave Frederick II of Hesse-Kassel, moved to Denmark to take care of her deceased sister's children. She brought her three sons with her, who were brought up at the Danish court, and William was introduced to Louise as a playmate during their childhood.

Wilhelmina Caroline and William married at the chapel of Christiansborg Palace on 1 September 1764. One month after their wedding, they left Denmark and settled in the county of Hanau-Münzenberg which had been separated from the landgraviate of Hesse-Kassel and assigned to William. Here they took up residence in the city of Hanau, where they lived with their own court.

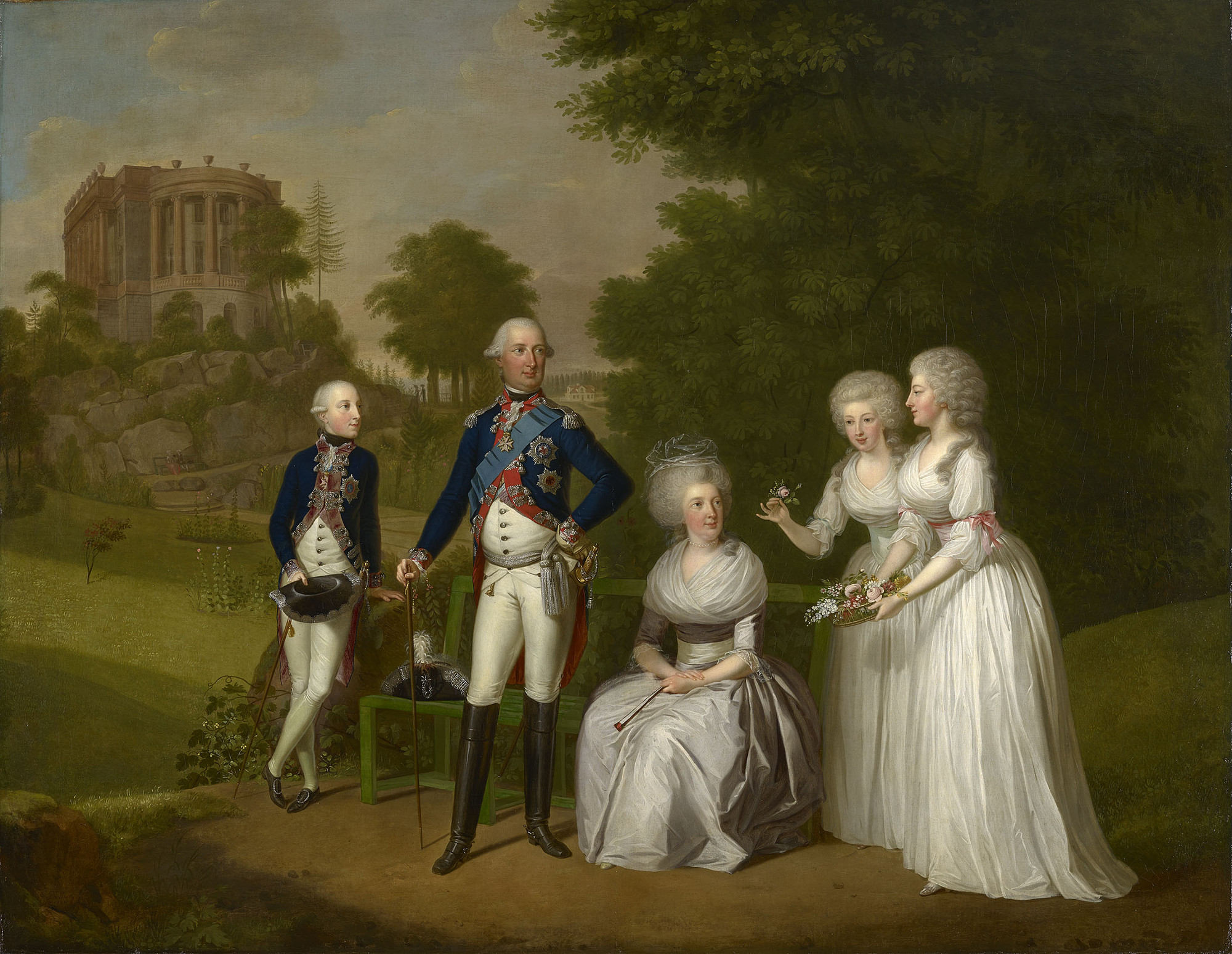
William IX, Wilhelmine Caroline of Denmark, and their surviving children, Wilhelm, Friederika and Caroline. Painting by Wilhelm Böttner, 1791

=== Life in Hesse ===
During the first years of their marriage, the relationship between Wilhelmina Caroline and William was described as happy. In 1770, six years after their marriage, Wilhelmina Caroline was visited by her brother-in-law Crown Prince Gustav of Sweden and his brother Prince Frederick Adolf, and at that occasion, the marriage between her and William was favorably compared to the marriage of her sister Sophia Magdalena of Denmark and Gustav of Sweden, and a suggestion was made for her and William to visit Sweden, with the unofficial thought that their example might have a good effect on her sister and royal brother-in-law. The courtier Gustaf Johan Ehrensvärd, a member of the Swedish entourage, described Wilhelmina Caroline and William on this occasion in 1770:

"She is the sister of our Crown Princess, but as soon as she opens her mouth, the words come out different. She is charming, energetic, worshiped by her court... when the couple are with each other, they play as children, and during their games they produce one new child each year... I believe that it is the fault of the husband, when a woman, who is not of bad character, neglects him ..."

However, this good relationship was not to last: five years later, William had his first mistress, Charlotte Christine Buissine, and after this, the marriage deteriorated with William being constantly unfaithful and introducing a succession of official mistresses at court, with Buissine followed by Rosa Dorothea Ritter and Karoline von Schlotheim and William producing a great number of illegitimate children.

Wilhelmina Caroline herself was described as beautiful, distant, kind and sympathetic: in 1804, she still spoke Danish without accent and had a strong attachment to her birth country.

William succeeded as Landgrave William IX of Hesse-Kassel in 1785, and in 1803 was raised to the rank of Elector of Hesse as William I.

=== Later life ===
In 1806, Hesse was occupied by France. Her spouse and son fled to her brother-in-law Prince Charles of Hesse in Schleswig, but Wilhelmina Caroline remained until a French governor was installed, after which she moved to her daughter Karoline Amalie in Gotha.

She spent the duration of the Kingdom of Westphalia in exile, among other places in Schleswig and in Prague. In 1813, she and her husband returned to Kassel.

== Issue ==
- Landgravine Marie Friederike (1768–1839), married Alexius Frederick Christian, Duke of Anhalt-Bernburg
- Landgravine Karoline Amalie (1771–1848), married Augustus, Duke of Saxe-Gotha-Altenburg
- Frederick (1772–1784), died in childhood
- William II (1777–1847), Elector of Hesse

== Ancestry ==
Ancestors of Princess Wilhelmine Caroline of Denmark

8. Frederick IV of Denmark
4. Christian VI of Denmark
9. Louise of Mecklenburg-Güstrow
2. Frederick V of Denmark
10. Christian Heinrich, Margrave of Brandenburg-Kulmbach
5. Sophie Magdalene of Kulmbach
11. Sophie Christiane of Wolfstein
1. Wilhelmina Caroline of Denmark
12. George I of Great Britain
6. George II of Great Britain
13. Sophia Dorothea of Celle
3. Louise of Great Britain
14. John Frederick, Margrave of Brandenburg-Ansbach
7. Caroline of Ansbach
15. Eleonore Erdmuthe of Saxe-Eisenach

Princess Wilhelmine Caroline of Denmark House of Oldenburg Born: 10 July 1747 Died: 14 January 1820
German royalty
Preceded by Philippine of Brandenburg-Schwedt	Landgravine consort of Hesse-Kassel; 31 October 1785 – 1803	Title abolished
Title created	Electress consort of Hesse; 1803 – 14 January 1820	Vacant Title next held by Augusta of Prussia
