= Princess Karoline Amalie of Hesse-Kassel =

Duchess of Saxe-Gotha-Altenburg from 1804 to 1822

Princess Karoline Amalie
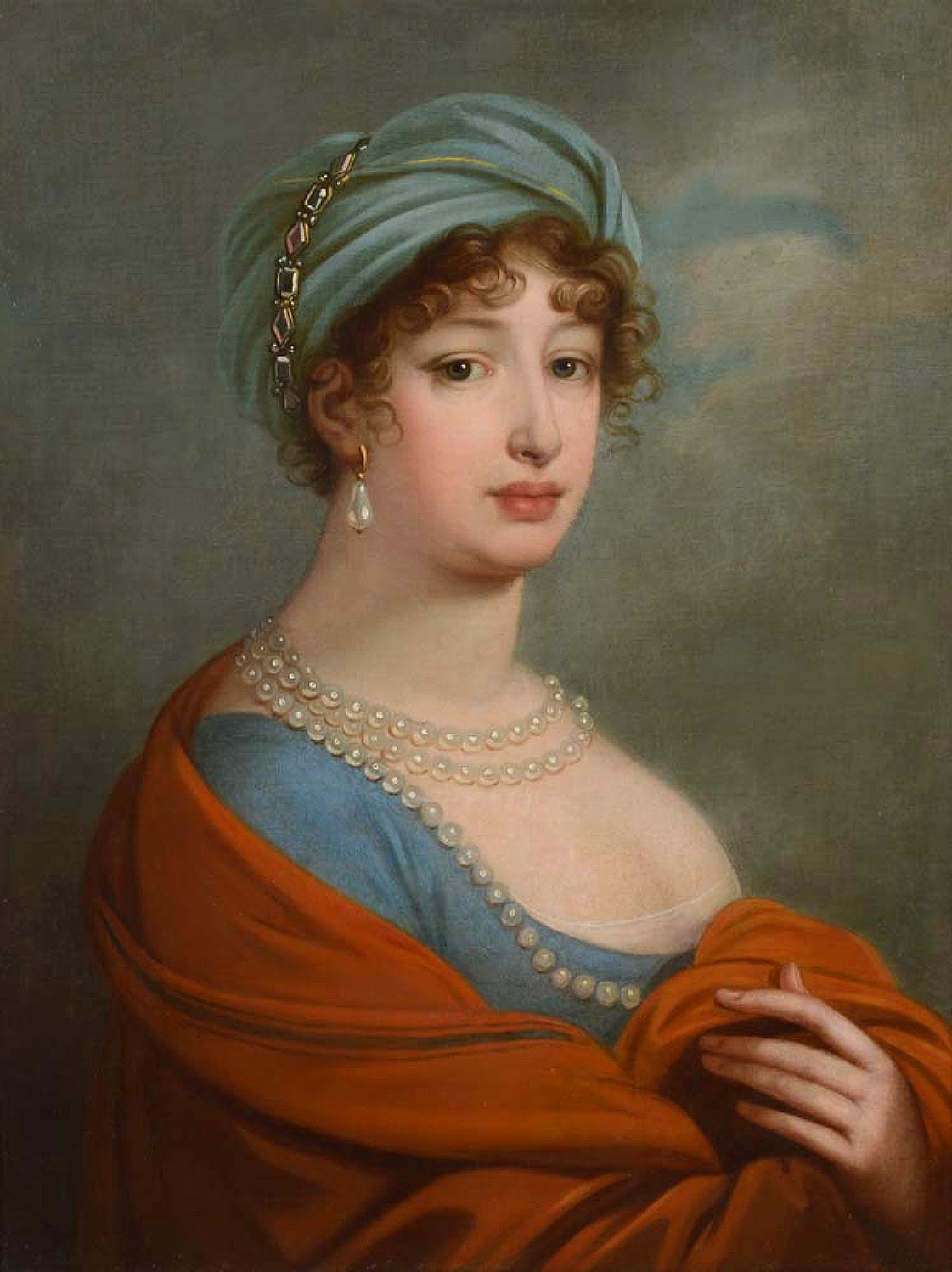
- Portrait of Karoline Amalie by Ludwig Döll, after an original by Joseph Maria Grassi, 1807

Duchess consort of Saxe-Gotha-Altenburg
- Tenure: 20 April 1804 – 27 May 1822
- Born: 11 July 1771; Hanau
- Died: 22 February 1848 (aged 76); Gotha
- Burial: 27 February 1848; Parkinsel, Gotha
- Spouse: Augustus, Duke of Saxe-Gotha-Altenburg (m. 1802; died 1822)
Names
- German: Karoline Amalie
- House: Hesse-Kassel
- Father: William I, Elector of Hesse
- Mother: Princess Wilhelmina Caroline of Denmark and Norway

Karoline Amalie of Hesse-Kassel (11 July 1771, in Hanau – 22 February 1848, in Gotha), was a German princess and member of the House of Hesse-Kassel by birth, and Duchess of Saxe-Gotha-Altenburg by marriage.

She was the second daughter of Landgrave (later Prince) William I of Hesse by Princess Wilhelmina Caroline of Denmark and Norway, daughter of King Frederick V.

== Life ==
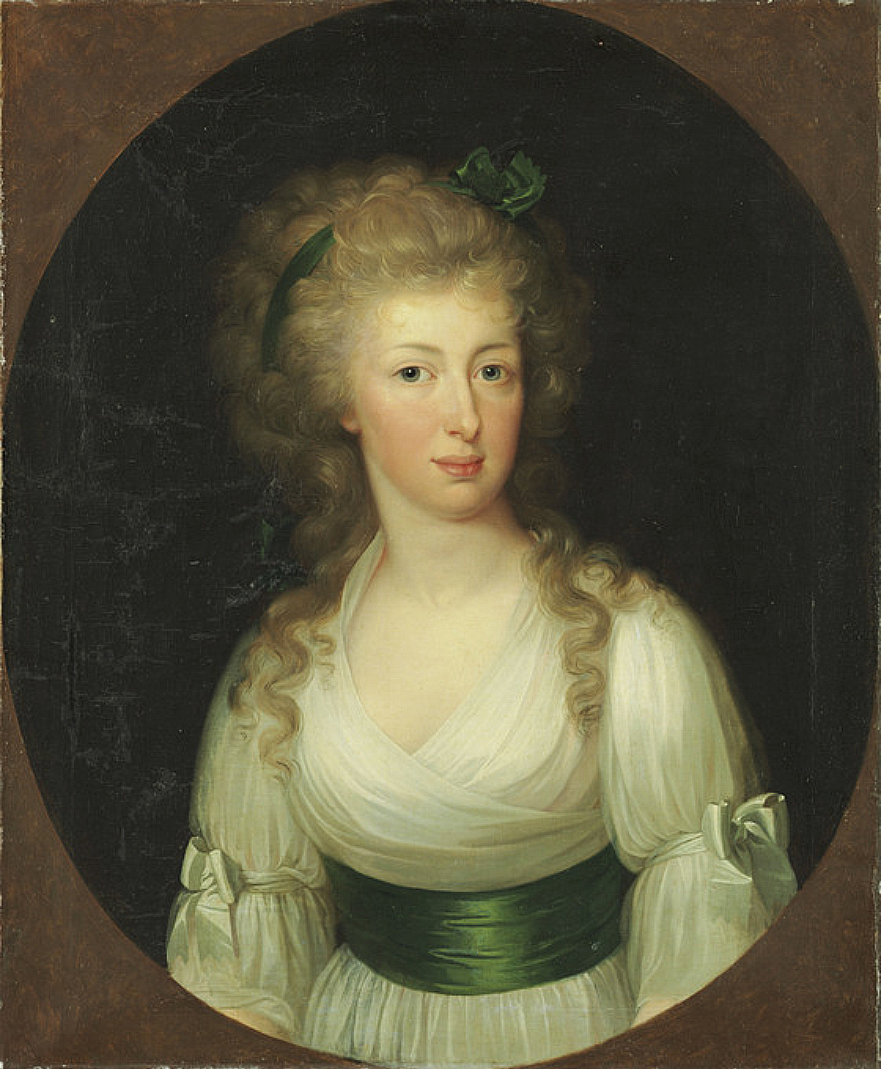
Her potrait, late 18th century.

Since early childhood, Karoline Amalie was betrothed to her double first-cousin Prince Frederik of Hesse; however, the engagement was dissolved in 1799 after the apparent affair between her and chamberlain Count Ludwig von Taube, who ended when Landgrave William I dismissed him from his service and expelled from court. In the summer of 1801 Karoline Amalie met Hereditary Prince Augustus of Saxe-Gotha-Altenburg when he visited the Kassel court. In January 1802 Duke Ernest II of Saxe-Gotha-Altenburg, in the name of his son, asked the hand of the princess in marriage. The wedding ceremony took place in her homeland, Kassel, on 24 April of that year.

The union remained childless, but Karoline Amalie was a devoted stepmother for her husband's daughter from his first marriage, Princess Louise. Two years later, in 1804, Karoline Amalie became Duchess consort of Saxe-Gotha-Altenburg after the death of her father-in-law.

The well-known painter Caroline Louise Seidler, who was at the court of Gotha in the winter of 1811 to paint the Ducal family, described Karoline Amalie rather unflattering as "good, benevolent, but not just an excellent lady". About the relation of the Duchess with her husband August, she also quoted: "She loved him enthusiastically, whose spirit astonished her".

However, "since their mutual points of view about life are completely different", the Ducal couple became estranged after a few years of marriage and Karoline Amalie withdrew herself increasingly from court life and the public in general, beginning in 1810. One main reason for this was the enthusiasm of her husband for Napoleon, which the Duchess didn't share, as her parents had been forced to flee into exile after the occupation of Hesse-Kassel by the French army in 1806.

After her husband's death in 1822, Karoline Amalie retired to Gotha Winter Palace (in German: Winterpalais) as her widow's seat. The residence was renamed by the population in her honour as the Widow's Palace (in German: Witwenpalais).

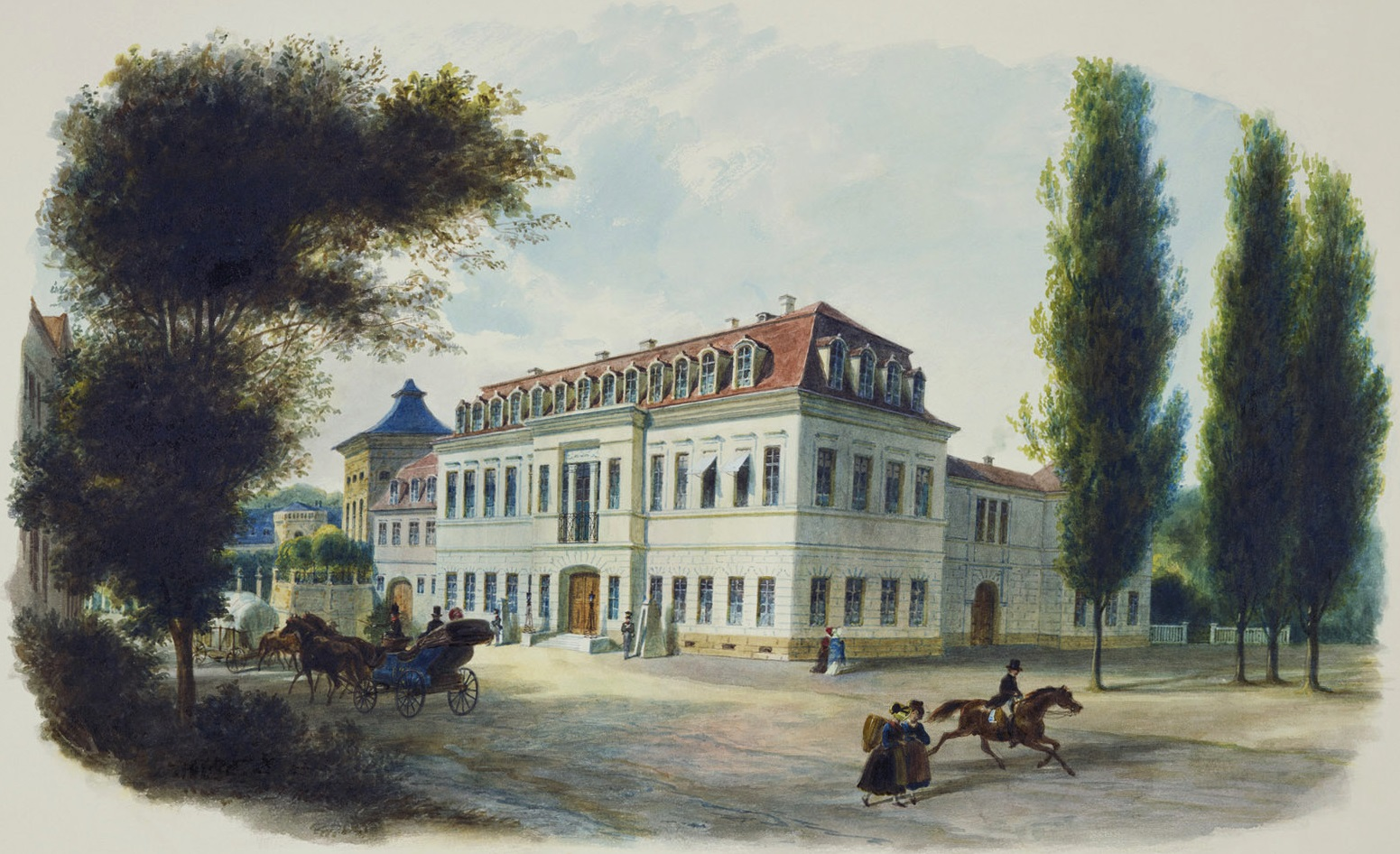
The Gotha Winter Palace, by Heinrich Justus Schneider, 1840.

Her summer residence, Schloss Friedrichsthal, was where the Dowager Duchess received the Royal British couple (Queen Victoria and Prince Albert) in August 1845 during their visit to Germany. The local Privilegirte Gothaische newspaper wrote on the occasion of this visit: "...everyone in Gotha rejoiced of happiness, when the revered noble princess, the widowed Duchess Carolina Amalia received the sublime wife of her beloved grandson, Prince Albert, in her maternal arms".

Prince Albert (youngest son of Karoline Amalie's stepdaughter Louise) was the favorite step-grandson of the Dowager Duchess. From 1822 to 1835, he and his brother Ernest spent several weeks every year in the care of Karoline Amalie in the Winter Palace. Until her death, Albert maintained with her an active correspondence, where he always called her "Beloved Grandmother" and addressed his letters with the signature "Your faithful grandson Albert".

Albert's brother, Duke Ernest II of Saxe-Coburg and Gotha also remembered his step-grandmother fondly; he quoted: "She had in her long life hardly an enemy and enjoyed until her death [...] a truly rare worship".

On 22 February 1848 Karoline Amalie died in the Winter Palace aged 76, after suffering from a chest illness as the Privilegirte Gothaische newspaper reported on the same day.

Five days later, on 27 February, the last member of the Ducal family of Saxe-Gotha-Altenburg was buried in the Parkinsel in Gotha, next to her husband, and at her specific request, was performed "without pomp". Like all graves located here from the Ducal family there is no gravestone for Karoline Amalie. The simple floral circle, which once made the grave marked, for decades no longer exists, so the exact place of Karoline Amalie's is unknown today.

Karoline Amalie was the last of the Duchess consorts from the line who Ernest I the Pious founded with the Duchy of Saxe-Gotha-Altenburg. The male line of the house had become extinct in 1825 with the death of her brother-in-law, Duke Frederick IV.

== Ancestry ==
Ancestors of Princess Karoline Amalie of Hesse-Kassel

8. William VIII, Landgrave of Hesse-Kassel
4. Frederick II, Landgrave of Hesse
9. Dorothea Wilhelmine of Saxe-Zeitz
2. William I, Elector of Hesse
10. George II of Great Britain
5. Princess Mary of Great Britain
11. Caroline of Brandenburg-Ansbach
1. Caroline Amalie of Hesse-Kassel
12. Christian VI of Denmark
6. Frederick V of Denmark
13. Sophia Magdalen of Brandenburg-Kulmbach
3. Wilhelmina Caroline of Denmark and Norway
14. George II of Great Britain
7. Louise of Great Britain
15. Caroline of Brandenburg-Ansbach

== Notes ==
Princess Karoline Amalie of Hesse-Kassel House of Hesse-Kassel Cadet branch of the House of Hesse Born: 11 July 1771 Died: 22 February 1848
German royalty
Preceded by Charlotte of Saxe-Meiningen	Duchess consort of Saxe-Gotha-Altenburg; 20 April 1804 – 27 May 1822	The line of Saxe-Gotha-Altenburg became extinct and was split between Saxe-Coburg-Saalfeld and Saxe-Hildburghausen to form Saxe-Coburg and Gotha and Saxe-Altenburg
