= Julius Jacob von Haynau =

19th-century Austrian general (1786–1853)

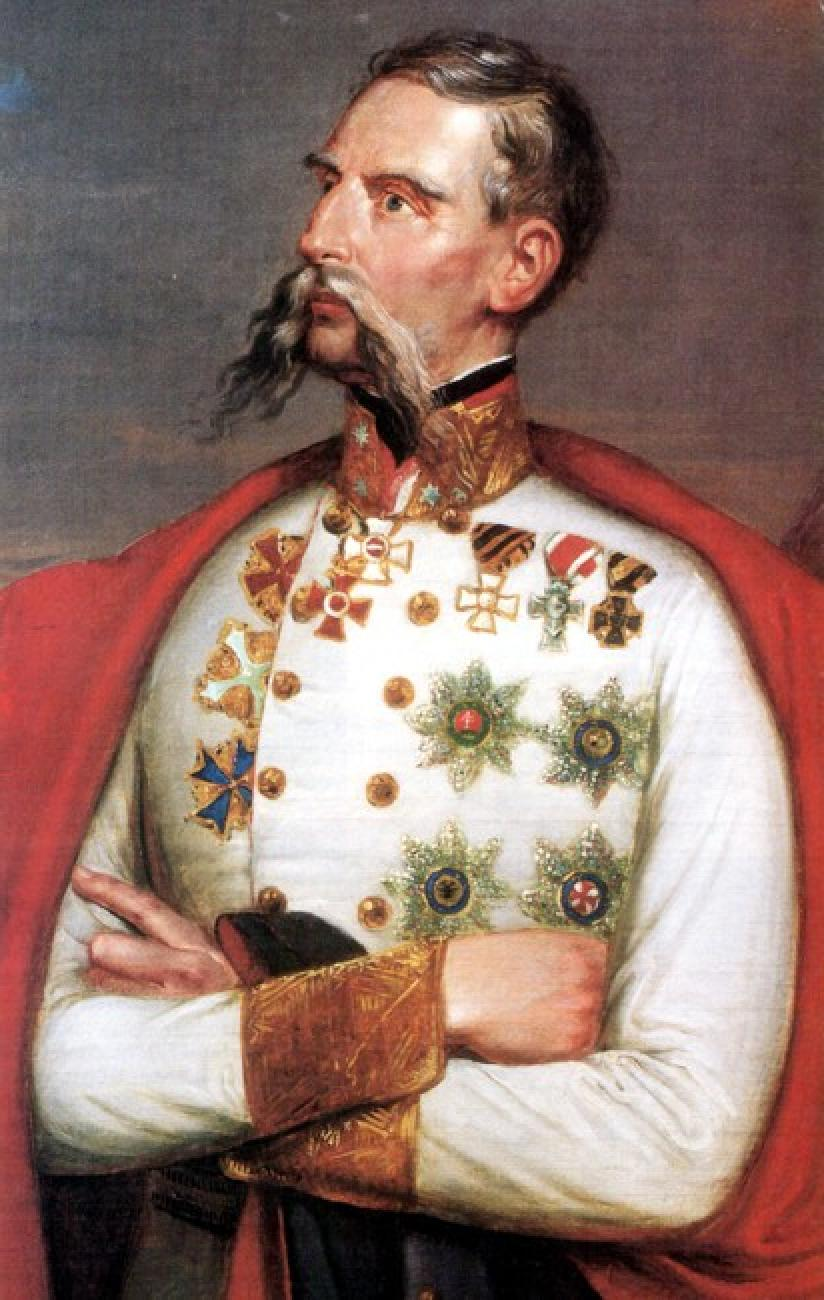
- General von Haynau
- Born: 14 October 1786; Kassel, Landgraviate of Hesse-Kassel, Holy Roman Empire
- Died: 14 March 1853 (aged 66); Vienna, Austrian Empire
- Spouse: Thérèse von Weber (m. 1808; died 1850)
- Children: Clotilde von Haynau
- Relatives: William I, Elector of Hesse (father); Rosa Dorothea Ritter (mother)
- Military career
- Allegiance: Austrian Empire
- Branch: Austrian Army during the French Revolutionary and Napoleonic Wars, Imperial Austrian Army of 1806–1867
- Service years: 1801–1850
- Rank: Field marshal lieutenant
- Nicknames: Austrian Butcher; Hyena of Brescia; Hangman of Arad
- Conflicts: Napoleonic Wars; First Italian War of Independence; Hungarian Revolution of 1848; Second Battle of Komárom; Third Battle of Komárom; Battle of Szőreg; Battle of Temesvár
- Awards: Military Order of Maria Theresa; Military Order of Max Joseph; Royal Guelphic Order; Order of St. George

Julius Jakob Freiherr von Haynau (14 October 1786 – 14 March 1853) was an Austrian general who suppressed insurrectionary movements in Italy and Hungary in 1848 and later. While a hugely effective military leader, he also gained renown as an aggressive and ruthless commander. His soldiers called him the "Habsburg Tiger"; those opponents who suffered from his brutality called him the "Hyena of Brescia" and the "Hangman of Arad".

== Early life and education ==
Born in Kassel, Julius Jacob von Haynau was the illegitimate son of Rosa Dorothea Ritter, and William I (1743–1821), the landgrave (later elector) of Hesse-Kassel. He was born after his father's return with his wife and family to Hesse-Kassel after 20 years in Denmark. His father acknowledged this natural son, providing for his education and entry into the military officer corps as a cadet. In 1800, Julius Jacob and his siblings were granted the title of Freiherren/Freiinnen von Haynau.

== Marriage and family ==
Arms of the Freiherren von Haynau

After several years of service in the Army, at nearly 22 years of age, on 11 October 1808 Haynau married Thérèse Weber von Trauenfels (1787–1851), the daughter of Field Marshal Lieutenant Franz Johann Baptist Weber von Treuenfels (1745–1809). Her father was killed in action the next year at the Battle of Aspern-Essling during the Napoleonic Wars.

Julius and Thérèse had more than four decades of marriage together before her death in 1850. She was survived by her husband and only daughter, Clotilde (27 September 1809 – 25 November 1897).

== Military career ==
In 1801, Haynau entered the Austrian army as an infantry officer cadet at the age of 15. He gained extensive experience as a soldier during the Napoleonic Wars. He was wounded at Wagram in 1809, which the French won in one of their most important battles of the wars.

Haynau later distinguished himself during the Austrian operations in Italy in 1813 and 1814. Between 1815 and 1847, Haynau was promoted several times, reaching the rank of field marshal lieutenant.

=== Role in the revolutions ===
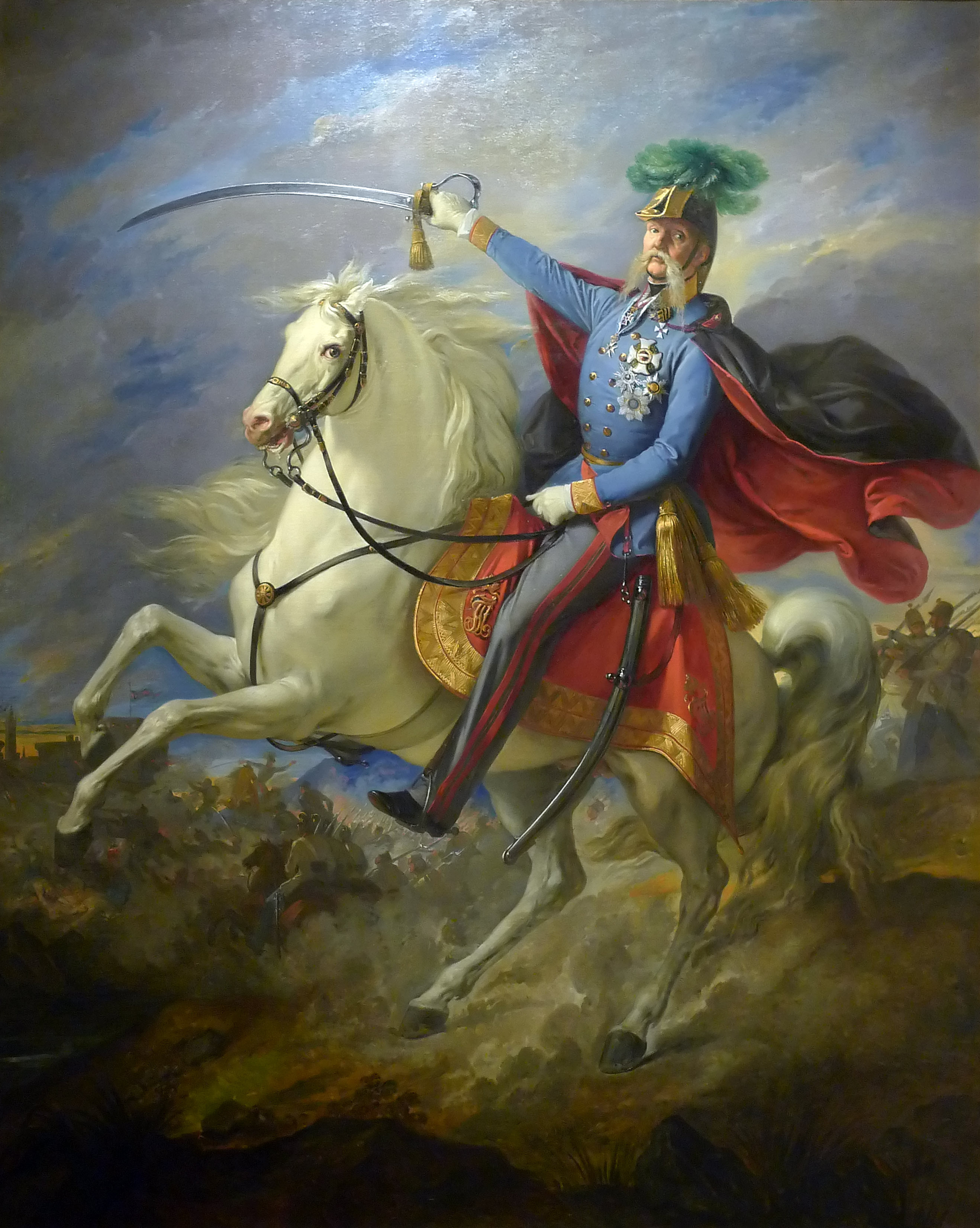
Painting by Giuseppe Bezzoli in 1853 depicting Haynau in command of his troops.

Haynau was said to have a violent temper, which led him into trouble with his superiors. His support for the monarchy led him to fiercely oppose the revolutionary movements of the mid-nineteenth century.

When the revolutionary insurrections of 1848 broke out in Italy, Haynau was selected to command troops to suppress them. He fought with success in Italy. He became known in this period for the severity with which he suppressed an uprising in Brescia and punished participants. A mob in Brescia had massacred invalid Austrian soldiers in the hospital, and von Haynau ordered reprisals. Numerous attackers were executed.

In June 1849, Haynau was called to Vienna to command a reserve army; he was ordered into the field against the Hungarians during their revolution and finally managed to defeat it with the help of an overwhelming Russian interventionist force, proving an effective but ruthless leader. His aggressive strategy may have partly been motivated by his wish to make Austria, rather than Russia, appear as the main victor of the war. Indeed, the general questioned the wisdom of inviting the Russians to intervene, as he considered that Austria, with reinforcements from Italy, could have won the war on its own.

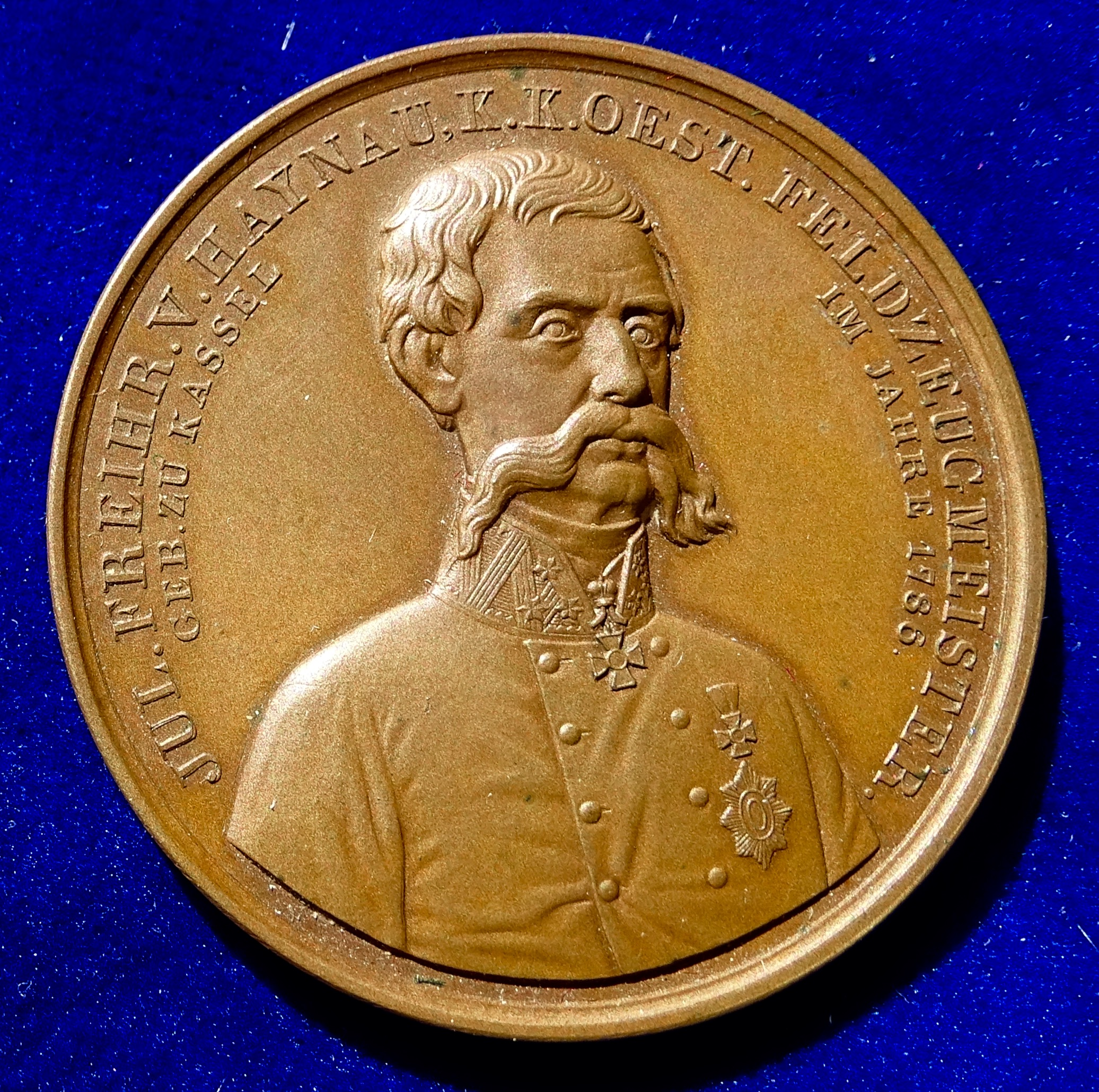
Austrian Medal honouring Haynau in 1849, obverse.

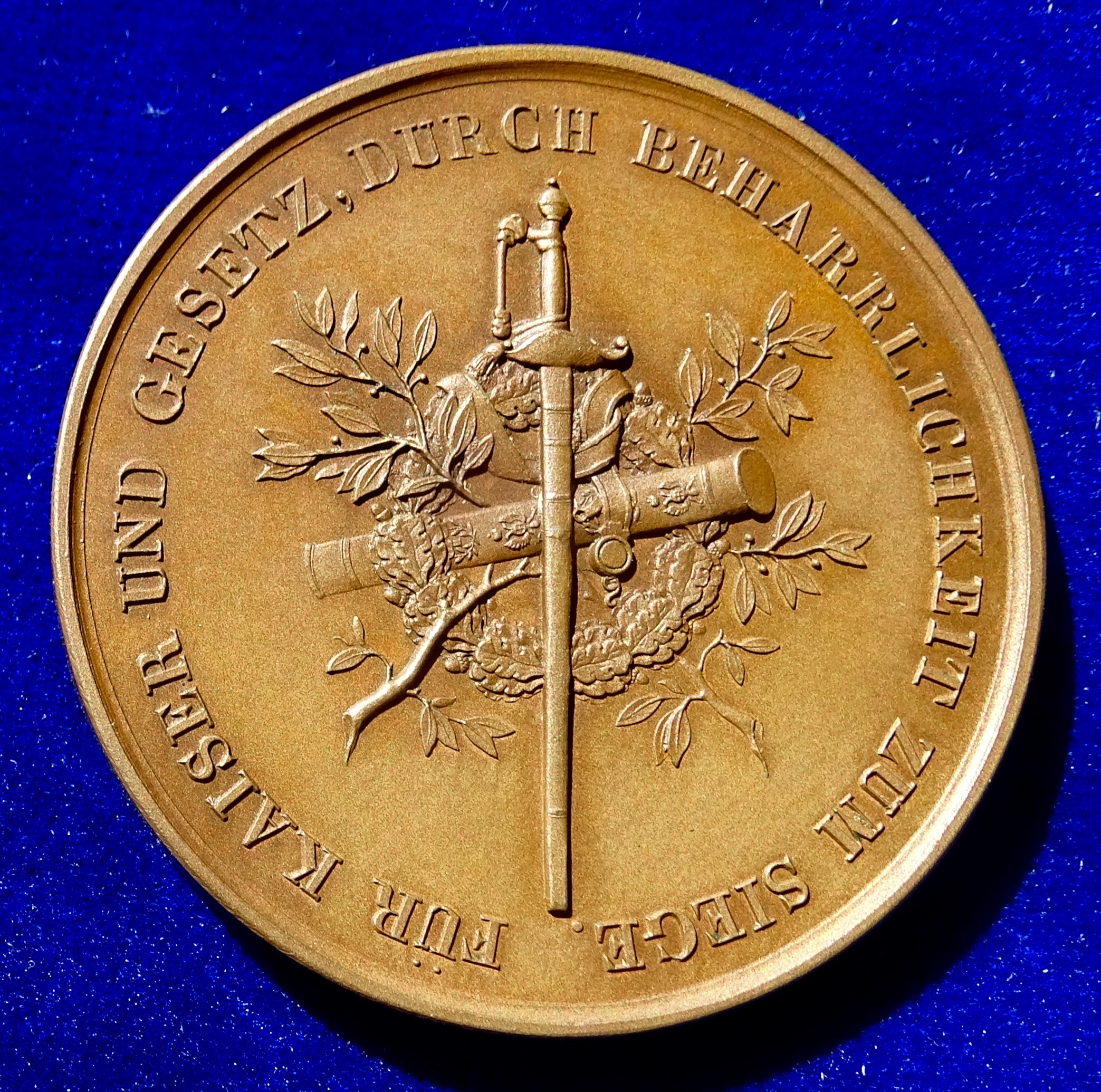
Austrian Medal honouring Haynau in 1849, reverse.

In Hungary as in Italy, Haynau was accused of brutality. For instance, he was said to have ordered women whipped who were suspected of sympathizing with the insurgents. He also ordered the execution by hanging of the 13 Hungarian rebel generals at Arad on 6 October 1849.

Opponents called him the "Hyena of Brescia" and "Hangman of Arad". In admiration, Austrian soldiers referred to him as the "Habsburg Tiger".

=== Later years ===
Upon the restoration of peace, Haynau was appointed to high command in Hungary. His temper quickly led him into quarrels with the minister of war, and he resigned his command in 1850. In later years, he travelled abroad, including to western Europe and England.

He was widely acclaimed throughout Western Europe "Hyena of Brescia" and "Hangman of Arad"

His reputation for brutality had spread throughout western Europe. In Brussels, Haynau narrowly escaped mob violence. In London, he was attacked by some draymen from the Barclay & Perkins brewery who threw mud and dung at him and chased him, shouting "Down with the Austrian butcher!".

Londoners attacked Haynau

"At first, they tossed a bundle of straw or a bale of hay down from the attic, and the crowd surged forward with great uproar, pelting it with barley, all manner of refuse, and debris, while they began to prod it with brooms, etc. From all sides, the crowd shouted, 'Down with the Austrian butcher!' In response to this, Haynau and his companions broke through the angry throng and fled the factory, but to their misfortune, they found themselves confronted by a waiting crowd of around 500 people outside, mostly workers, coal heavers, street children, and even women, who, cursing and shouting, beat him, tore his coat from his back, and dragged him by his long yellow mustache along Bankside, which runs by the Thames. The general ran for his life until he finally reached a tavern, the George public house, where he rushed through the open door, much to the astonishment of the landlady, Mrs. Benfield, and hid under a bed. Fortunately for him, the old structure had many doors, and as the crowd pressed in behind him, breaking down door after door, they could not find him. They might have killed him if the terrified landlady had not sent a swift messenger for the police to the nearby Southwark station, from where, shortly thereafter, Inspector Squires arrived with several officers, who rescued Haynau from his precarious situation."

Haynau had already been a figure of hatred in the English satirical press, but after the event, they published sarcastic caricatures of him on a daily basis.

"After the scandal, Haynau immediately left the English capital, but before his departure, he thanked the local authorities for the protection they had provided him. When the Italian revolutionary, Giuseppe Garibaldi, visited England in 1864, he insisted on visiting the brewery to thank the draymen."
"Haynau faced similar treatment in Brussels, where he was reproached for the whipping of women. In Paris, the government had to do everything to ensure his safety, as the Parisians organized in groups to search for him upon learning that Haynau was in the city. In contrast, he was celebrated in the conservative Berlin. After his return, the loyal leadership of Vienna elected him an honorary citizen of the city.

Haynau is buried in St. Leonhard Cemetery in Graz, Austria.

== References in popular culture ==
In 1862, during the American Civil War, the Union General Benjamin Butler commanded federal forces occupying New Orleans, Louisiana. They struggled with daily insults from the residents. He ordered that women showing disrespect toward the Union officers were to be treated as common prostitutes. The Confederate General P. G. T. Beauregard referred to Butler as "the Haynau of the North" for his order. Beauregard did not explain his allusion, believing that his officers were familiar with Haynau's reputation.

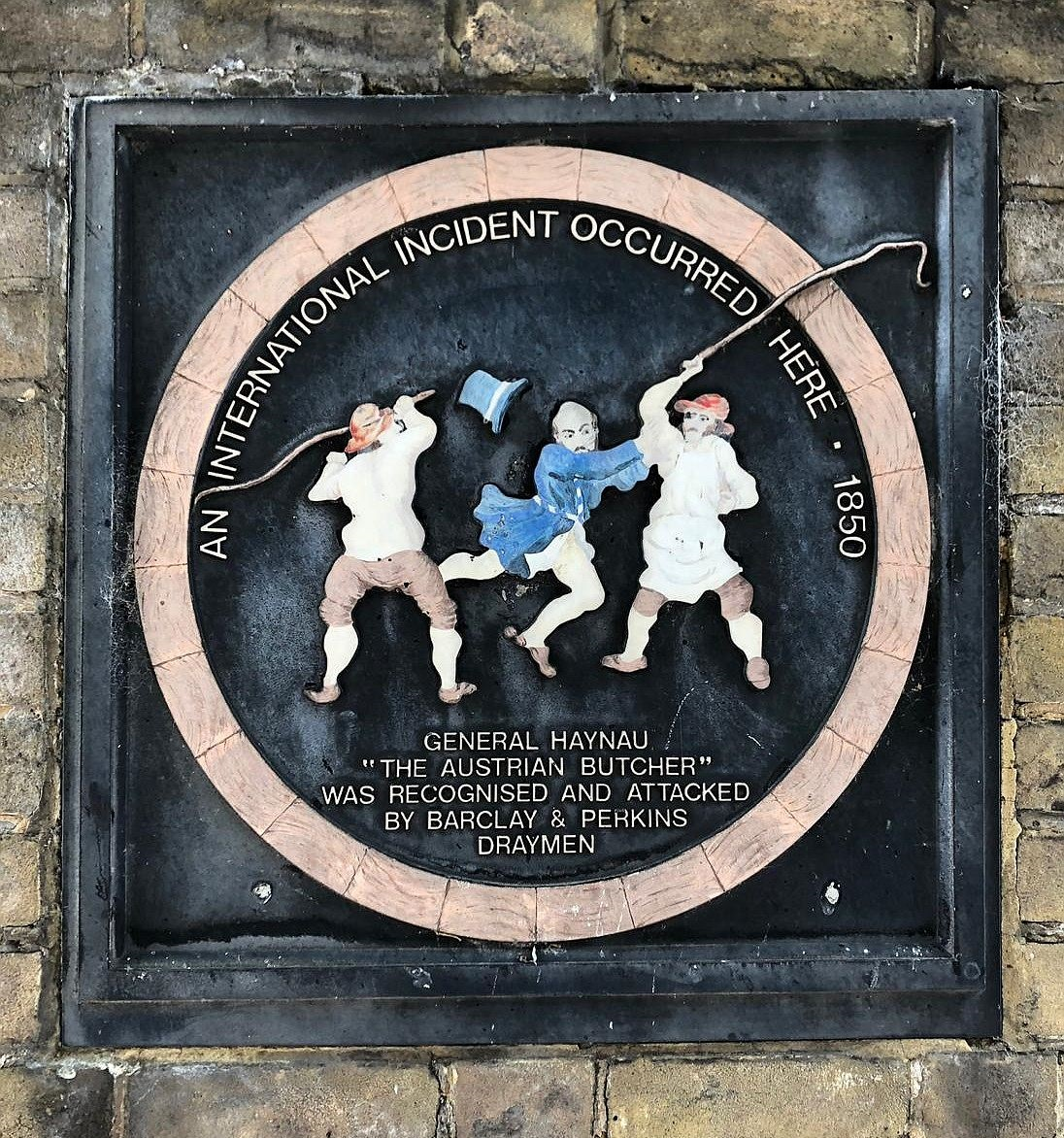
Plaque in Park Street, Southwark, London, commemorating the "international incident" when two draymen attacked General Haynau

G. K. Chesterton, the English author, later described the event near the Barclay & Perkins brewery in London in his book The Crimes of England (1916), published during the First World War while Britain and Ireland were at war with Germany:

When an Austrian general who had flogged women in the conquered provinces appeared in the London streets, some common draymen off a cart behaved with the direct quixotry of Sir Lancelot or Sir Galahad. He had beaten women and they beat him. They regarded themselves simply as avengers of ladies in distress, breaking the bloody whip of a German bully.

A fictional portrayal of von Haynau appears in the 2022 novel, Assassin's Creed The Engine of History: The Magus Conspiracy, written by Kate Heartfield.

Marcus Lehmann, in his 1883 novella 'Vanished' (Feldheim 1981) mentions Haynau's role in the Hungarian Revolution and his difficulties in the aforementioned European cities.

== Honours ==
He received the following orders and decorations:

- Austrian Empire:
  - Commander of the Military Order of Maria Theresa, 29 July 1849; Grand Cross, 26 March 1850
  - Grand Cross of St. Stephen, 1850
  - Knight of the Iron Crown, 1st Class
  - Commander of the Imperial Order of Leopold
- Kingdom of Bavaria: Grand Cross of the Military Order of Max Joseph
- Kingdom of Hanover: Grand Cross of the Royal Guelphic Order, 1849
- Electorate of Hesse:
  - Knight of the Pour la Vertu Militaire, 5 January 1815
  - Knight of the Iron Helmet, 19 August 1815
  - Grand Cross of the Golden Lion, 22 September 1849
- Russian Empire:
  - Knight of St. George, 4th Class, May 1849
  - Knight of St. Andrew, in Diamonds, August 1849
  - Knight of St. Alexander Nevsky, August 1849
  - Knight of the White Eagle, August 1849
  - Knight of St. Anna, 3rd Class
- Two Sicilies: Knight of St. Januarius
