= William I, Elector of Hesse =

William I
- Elector of Hesse
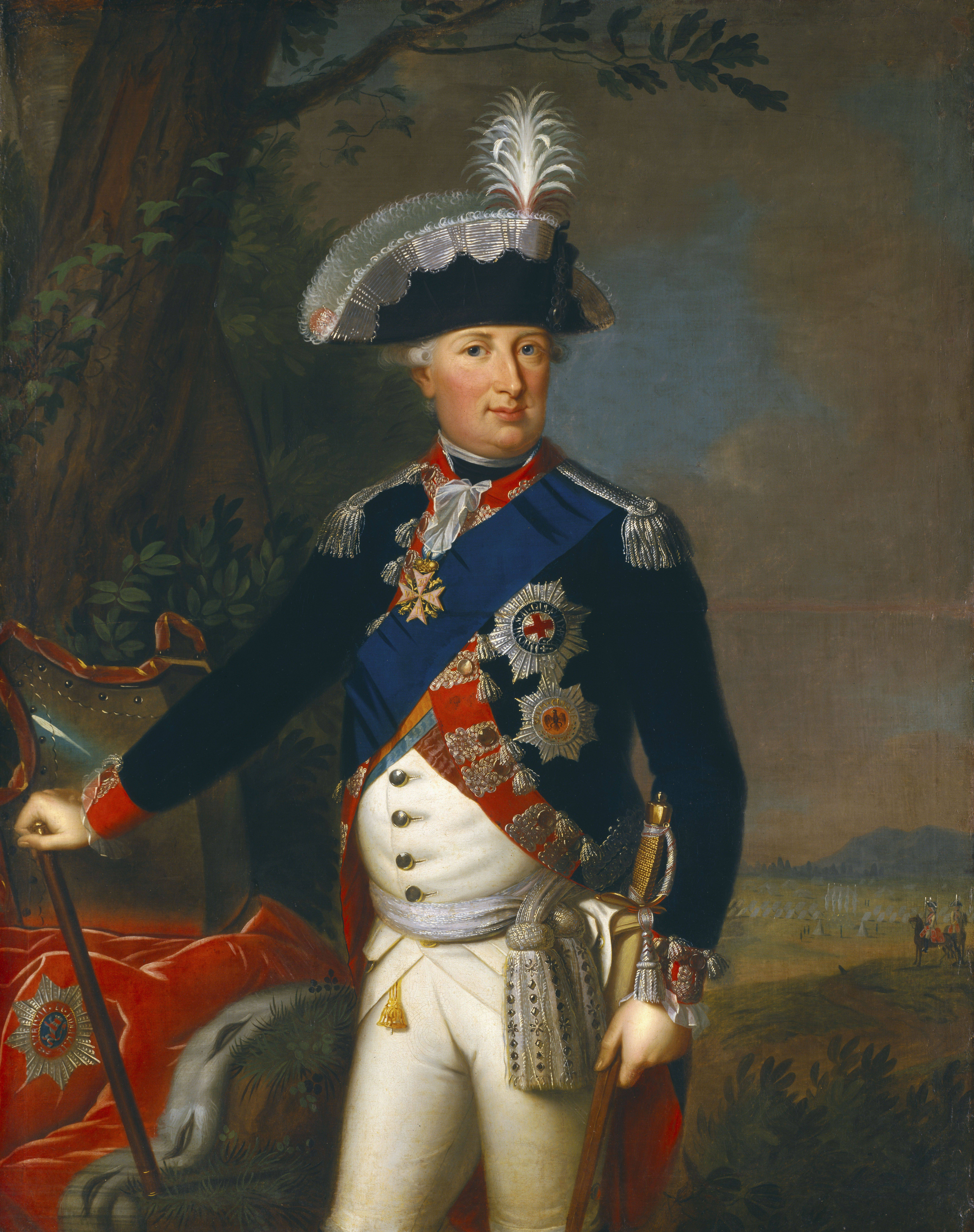
- Portrait by Wilhelm Böttner, c. 1795

Elector of Hesse
- 1st reign: 15 May 1803 – 28 August 1807
- 2nd reign: 30 October 1813 – 27 February 1821
- Successor: William II

Landgrave of Hesse-Kassel As William IX
- Reign: 31 October 1785 – 15 May 1803
- Predecessor: Frederick II
- Born: 3 June 1743; Kassel, Hesse-Kassel, Holy Roman Empire
- Died: 27 February 1821 (aged 77); Kassel, Hesse, German Confederation
- Spouse: Princess Wilhelmina Caroline of Denmark (m. 1764; died 1820)
- Issue among others...: Marie Friederike, Duchess of Anhalt-Bernburg; Karoline Amelie, Duchess of Saxe-Gotha-Altenburg; Friedrich; William II, Elector of Hesse; Julius Jacob von Haynau (illegitimate)
- House: Hesse
- Father: Frederick II, Landgrave of Hesse-Kassel
- Mother: Princess Mary of Great Britain
- Religion: Calvinist

William I, Elector of Hesse (German: Wilhelm I., Kurfürst von Hessen; 3 June 1743 – 27 February 1821) was the eldest surviving son of Frederick II, Landgrave of Hesse-Kassel (or Hesse-Cassel) and Princess Mary of Great Britain, the daughter of George II.

== Biography ==
=== Early life ===
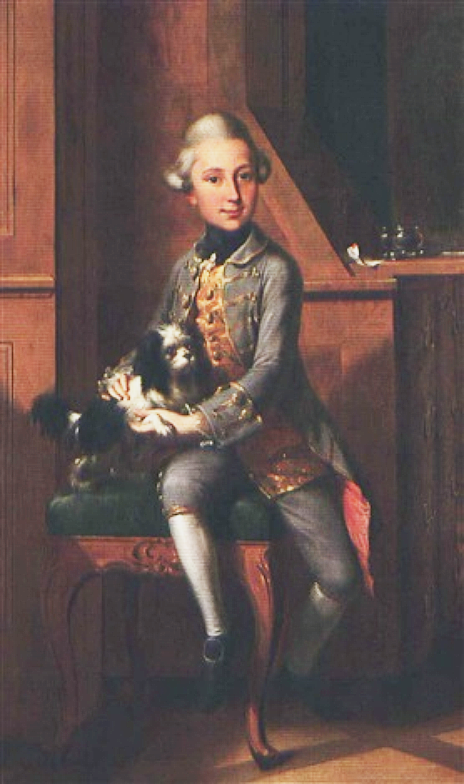
Prince William as a boy

Prince William was born on 3 June 1743 in Kassel, capital of the Landgraviate of Hesse-Kassel in the Holy Roman Empire. Born into the House of Hesse, he was the second but eldest surviving son of Prince Frederick of Hesse-Kassel (the future Landgrave Frederick II) and his wife, Princess Mary of Great Britain. A former heir to the landgraviate, also named William, had died in infancy in 1742; therefore, hopes were high for the future of the new heir apparent. He had two younger brothers: Prince Charles and Prince Frederick.

His father's marriage with the British princess was not a happy one, and Frederick abandoned the family in 1747 and converted to Catholicism in 1749. In 1755 he formally annulled his marriage. William's grandfather, Landgrave William, granted the newly acquired county of Hanau to his daughter-in-law and grandsons. Technically, young William became the reigning prince of Hanau, while under his mother's regency. The young prince William, together with his two younger brothers, lived with their mother, the landgravine Mary. From 1747 they were supported by Protestant relatives and moved to Denmark. There they lived with Mary's sister, Louise of Great Britain, and her family; Louise died in 1751.

=== Marriage ===
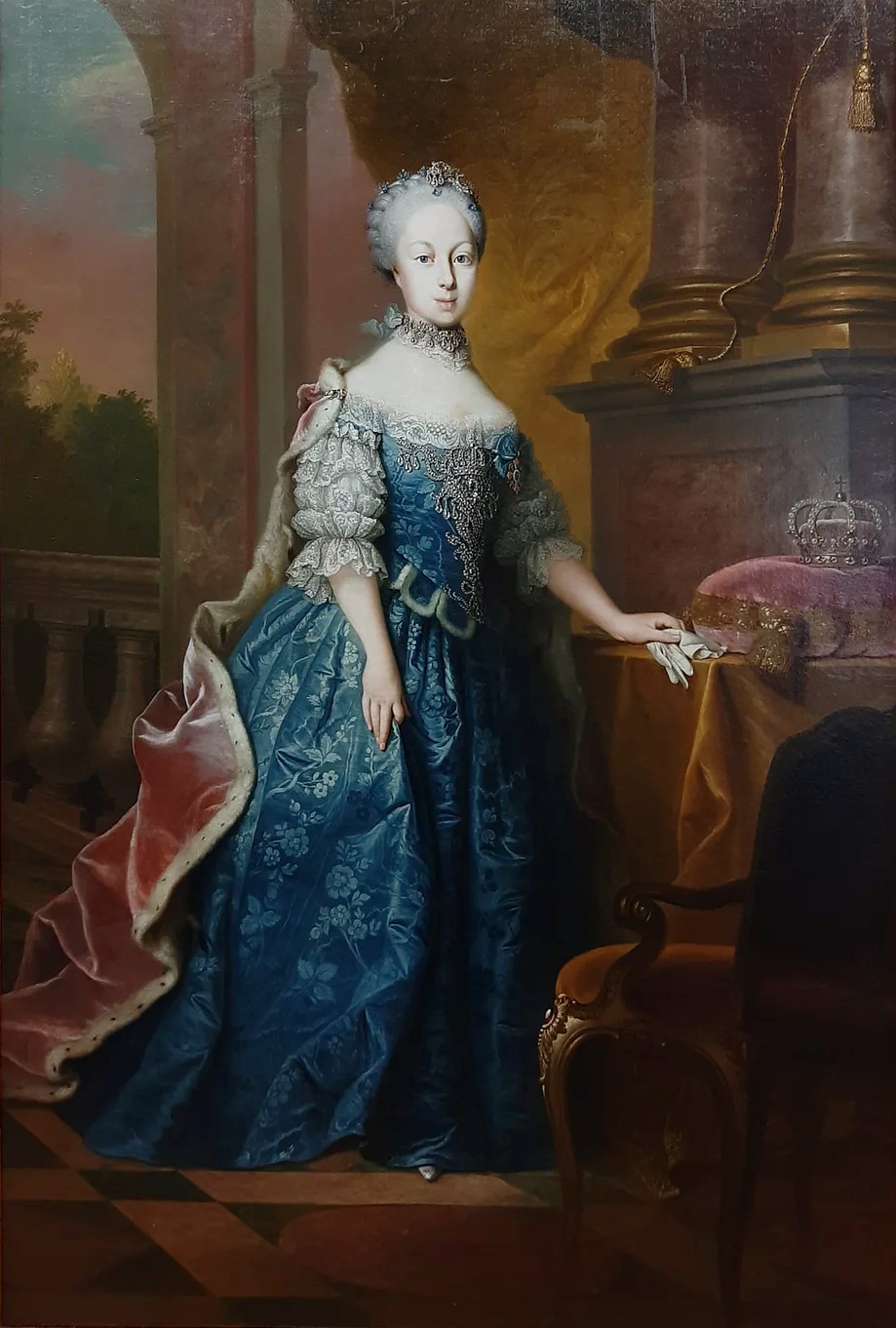
His wife, Princess Wilhelmina Caroline, c. 1765

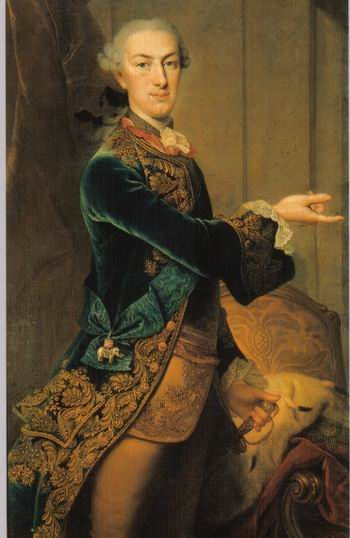
Portrait of William as Hereditary Prince of Hesse-Kassel, c. 1765

On 1 September 1764, William married his first cousin, Wilhelmina Caroline of Denmark and Norway (1747–1820), who was the second surviving daughter of Frederick V of Denmark and Norway. They married at Christiansborg Palace and resided for two decades mostly in Denmark.

In 1785 they moved to Kassel when William succeeded to the landgraviate. During the lifetime of his father, William had already received the Principality of Hanau, south of the Hessian territories near Frankfurt, as successor of its newly extinct princes. The Hanau people did not want to have a Catholic ruler.

William's younger brother Charles in 1766 married another of their Danish first cousins, Princess Louise of Denmark.

=== Reign ===
Upon the death of his father on 31 October 1785, he became William IX, Landgrave of Hesse-Kassel. He was said to have inherited one of the largest fortunes in Europe at the time.

William looked for help in managing his estate. He hired Mayer Amschel Rothschild as "Hoffaktor" in 1769, to supervise the operation of his properties and tax-gathering. The wealth of William's estate provided a good living for Rothschild and the men had a strong relationship; he founded the Rothschild family dynasty, which became important in financing and banking in Europe. Although they had been acquainted since 1775, William IX did not formally designate Rothschild as his overseer until 1801.

The early fortunes of the Rothschild family were made through a conjunction of financial intelligence and the wealth of Prince William. During the Napoleonic Wars, William used the Frankfurt Rothschilds to hide his fortune from Napoleon. This money then saw its way through to Nathan Mayer, (N.M.) in London, where it helped fund the British movements through Portugal and Spain. The interest made from this venture was reaped by the budding banker barons, who used it to swiftly develop their fortune and prestige in Europe and Britain. It was not long before their riches outweighed those of their benefactor, William of Hesse-Kassel.

In 1803, Landgrave William was created His Royal and Serene Highness The Prince-Elector of Hesse. In 1807 his electorate was annexed by the Kingdom of Westphalia, ruled by Jérôme Bonaparte, Napoleon's brother. William escaped to Denmark with his family and lived there in exile until the French were expelled from Germany. Following the defeat of the Napoleonic armies in the Battle of Leipzig, William was restored in 1813.

After the restoration of the Electorate, he started with building a monumental palace in Kassel, the Chattenburg. Construction was halted after his death.

He was a member of the Tugendbund, a quasi-Masonic secret society founded after the Battle of Jena–Auerstedt in June 1808 at Koningsberg.

Several other prince-electors of the Holy Roman Empire had been recognized as kings at the Congress of Vienna (1815), and William attempted to join them by declaring himself King of the Chatti. However, the European powers refused to recognize this title at the Congress of Aix-la-Chapelle (1818) and instead granted him the grand ducal style of "Royal Highness." Deeming the title of Prince-Elector to be superior in dignity to that of Grand Duke, William chose to remain an Elector, even though there was no longer a Holy Roman Emperor to elect. Hesse-Kassel would remain an Electorate until it was annexed by Prussia in 1866.

He ruled until his death in Kassel in 1821. He was succeeded by his son William.

== Issue ==
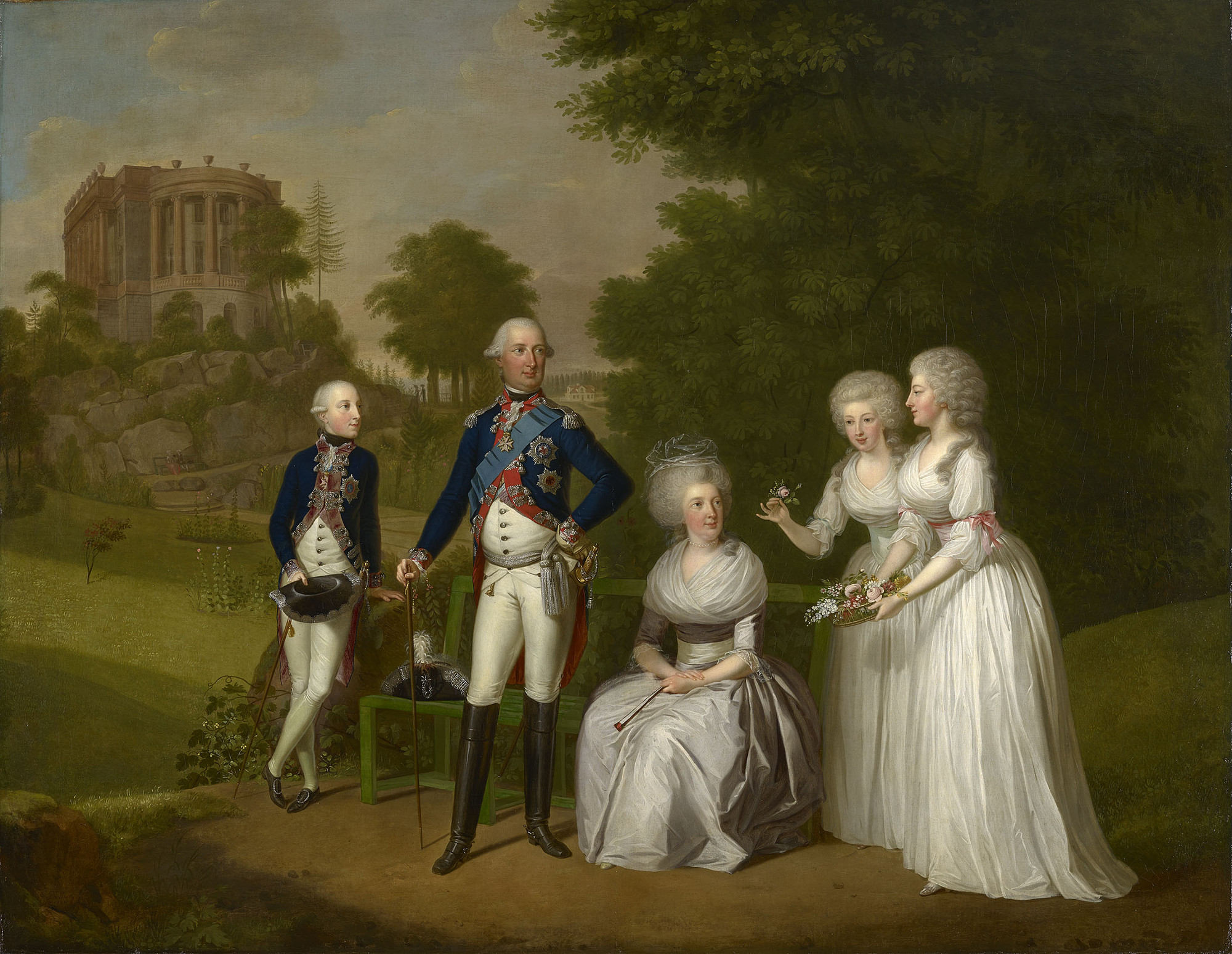
Wilhelm I, his wife, Wilhelmine Caroline and their surviving children: Wilhelm, Marie Friederike and Karoline Amalie

With his wife Wilhelmina Caroline of Denmark and Norway, William had four children:

- Marie Friederike (14 September 1768 – 17 April 1839), married Alexius Frederick Christian, Duke of Anhalt-Bernburg on 29 November 1794, divorced 1817
- Karoline Amalie (11 July 1771 – 22 February 1848), married Augustus, Duke of Saxe-Gotha-Altenburg on 24 April 1802. No issue
- Friedrich (8 August 1772 – 20 July 1784), died in childhood
- Wilhelm (28 July 1777 – 20 November 1847), his successor

William had several mistresses and fathered over twenty recognized illegitimate children, providing some financial means to each of them.

With his first official mistress, Charlotte Christine Buissine (1749-?), William had four children:

- Wilhelm von Heimrod (16 July 1775 – 6 January 1811)
- Karl von Heimrod (19 July 1776 – 13 May 1827), married Charlotte von Stockhausen (1781–1855) in 1803; they had seven children.
- Friedrich von Heimrod (9 August - 30 October 1777), died in infancy
- Friedrich von Heimrod (1778 – 3 September 1813); he had at least one son.

With his second official mistress, Rosa Dorothea Ritter (1759–1833), William had eight children:

- Wilhelm Karl von Haynau (24 December 1779 – 21 January 1856), married firstly Karoline von Schack (died 1807) in 1803; they had two children. Married secondly Luise Sophie Buderus von Carlshausen (1787–1813) in 1808; they had two children. Married thirdly Sophie Friederike von Lengerke (1798–1820) in 1818; no known children survived to adulthood. Married fourthly Elisabeth Freiin von Trott zu Solz (1793–1844) in 1822; they had three daughters.
- Georg Wilhelm von Haynau (27 February 1781 – February 1813), married Charlotte Sophie von Wildungen (1782–1858) in 1808; they had 3 children.
- Philipp Ludwig von Haynau (18 May 1782 – 5 June 1843), married Wilhelmine von Zeppelin (1791–1872) in 1821; they had two children.
- Wilhelmine von Haynau (20 July 1783 – 27 May 1866), married Karl Frhr von Hanstein (1771–1861) in 1801; they had nine children.
- Moritz von Haynau (4 July 1784 – 9 September 1812), married Anna Auguste von Wurmb (1789–1872) in 1809; they had two daughters.
- Marie Sophie Agnes Philippine Auguste von Haynau (11 September 1785 – 21 April 1865), married Wilhelm Freiherr von Wintzingerode (1782–1819) in 1805; they had one son.
- Julius Jacob von Haynau (14 October 1786 – 14 March 1853), married Theresia Weber von Treuenfels (1787–1851) in 1808; they had one daughter.
- Otto of Hanau (12 June 1788 – before 24 May 1792), died in childhood

With his third and final official mistress, Karoline von Schlotheim (1766–1847), William had 13 children:

- Wilhelm Friedrich von Hessenstein (23 June 1789 – 26 April 1790), died in infancy
- Wilhelm Karl von Hessenstein (19 May 1790 – 22 March 1867), married Angelika von Osten-Sacken (1802–1852) in 1820; they had one daughter.
- Ferdinand von Hessenstein (19 May 1791 – 15 December 1794), died in childhood
- Karoline Frederike Auguste von Hessenstein (9 June 1792 – 21 August 1797), died in childhood
- Auguste Wilhelmine von Hessenstein (22 August 1793 – 1 June 1795), died in childhood
- Ludwig Karl von Hessenstein (11 August 1794 – 17 November 1857), married Auguste von Pückler (21 September 1794 - 8 November 1861).
- Friederike von Hessenstein (16 October 1795 – 13 September 1845), married Wilhelm von Steuber (Kassel, 29 December 1790 - Kassel, 6 July 1845) in 1824; they had three children.
- Wilhelm Ludwig Georg von Hessenstein (28 July 1800 – 16 January 1836), married Luise von dem Bussche-Hünnefeld (27 March 1804 - 21 May 1829) in 1827; they had one son. Married secondly Karoline Wolff von Gudenburg (11 February 1812 – 20 August 1836) in 1831; they had two sons.
- Friedrich Ludwig von Hessenstein (8 February 1803 – 8 September 1805), died in childhood
- Karoline von Hessenstein (16 February 1804 – 18 March 1891), married Karl von Stenglin (12 August 1791 - 15 March 1871) in 1822; they had six children.
- stillborn child (1805)
- stillborn child (1806)
- stillborn son (1807 in Itzehoe)

From a relationship with Marianne Wulffen, Johann Heinrich Resse was born (1760, Kassel, Hessen), father of the renowned Portuguese-German engineer, Colonel João Guilherme Resse.

== See also ==
- Rulers of Hesse

== Ancestry ==
Ancestors of William I, Elector of Hesse

8. Charles I, Landgrave of Hesse-Kassel
4. William VIII, Landgrave of Hesse-Kassel
9. Maria Amalia of Courland
2. Frederick II, Landgrave of Hesse
10. Maurice Wilhelm, Duke of Saxe-Zeitz
5. Dorothea Wilhelmine of Saxe-Zeitz
11. Marie Amalie of Brandenburg
1. William I, Elector of Hesse
12. George I of Great Britain
6. George II of Great Britain
13. Sophia Dorothea of Celle
3. Princess Mary of Great Britain
14. John Frederick, Margrave of Brandenburg-Ansbach
7. Caroline of Brandenburg-Ansbach
15. Princess Eleonore Erdmuthe of Saxe-Eisenach

William I, Elector of Hesse House of Hesse Born: 3 June 1743 Died: 27 February 1821
| Preceded by William VIII | Count of Hanau-Münzenberg; 1 February 1760 – 27 February 1821 | Succeeded by William II |
| Preceded by Frederick II | Landgrave of Hesse-Kassel; 31 October 1785 – 15 May 1803 | Title abolished |
| New title | Elector of Hesse; 15 May 1803 – 28 August 1807 | Electorate annexed |
| New title Electorate reestablished | Elector of Hesse; 30 October 1813 – 27 February 1821 | Succeeded by William II |
