= Louise of Great Britain =

Queen of Denmark and Norway from 1746 to 1751

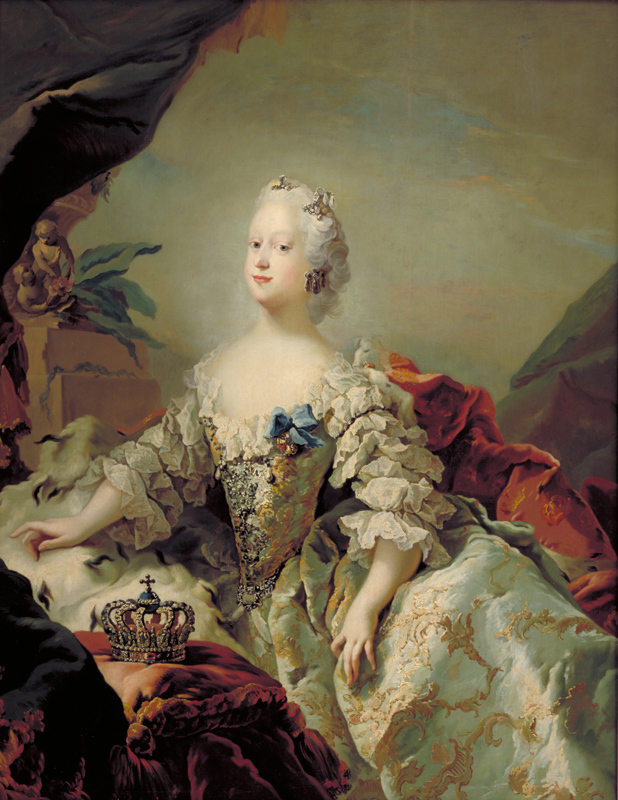
- Portrait by Carl Gustav Pilo, 1747

Queen consort of Denmark and Norway
- Tenure: 6 August 1746 – 19 December 1751
- Coronation: 4 September 1747
- Born: 18 December 1724 (New Style) (Note: Throughout Louise's life, Great Britain used the Old Style Julian calendar. Denmark–Norway had adopted the New Style Gregorian calendar in 1700. Old Style is used in this article for dates occurring during Louise's stay in Great Britain unless otherwise indicated; however, years are assumed to start from 1 January and not 25 March, which was the English New Year.); Leicester House, London, England
- Died: 19 December 1751 (aged 27); Christiansborg Palace, Copenhagen, Denmark
- Burial: Roskilde Cathedral
- Spouse: Frederick V of Denmark (m. 1743)
- Issue: Christian, Crown Prince of Denmark; Sophia Magdalena, Queen of Sweden; Wilhelmine Caroline, Electress of Hesse; Christian VII of Denmark; Louise, Princess Charles of Hesse-Kassel
- House: Hanover
- Father: George II of Great Britain
- Mother: Caroline of Ansbach

Louise of Great Britain (originally Louisa; 18 December [O.S. 7 December] 1724 – 19 December 1751) was Queen of Denmark and Norway from 1746 until her death, as the first wife of King Frederick V. She was the youngest surviving daughter of King George II of Great Britain and Caroline of Ansbach.

The marriage between Louise and Frederick V of Denmark was arranged solely for political reasons (King George's ministers wanted Danish support in disputes with Prussia). Although the marriage was arranged, the couple got along quite well, at least during the first years of marriage. Louisa, who encouraged performances by actors and musicians, was a popular figure at the Danish court even though she never exerted significant influence over her husband's decision-making.

== Early years ==
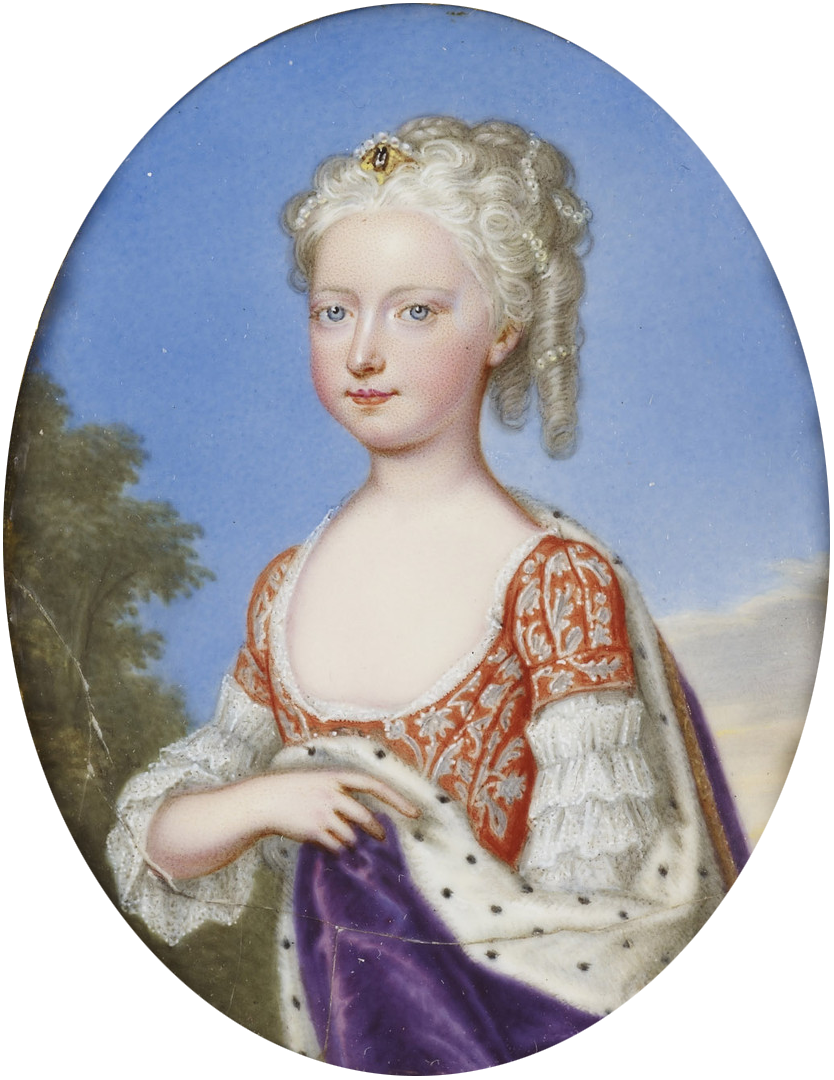
A miniature portrait of a young Princess Louise, by Christian Friedrich Zincke, 1730s (Royal Collection).

Princess Louise was born as the fifth daughter and youngest child of the then Prince and Princess of Wales, on 18 December [O.S. 7 December] 1724, at Leicester House, Westminster, London. She was born ten years after her paternal grandfather, Elector George Louis of Hanover, had succeeded to the thrones of Great Britain and Ireland in 1714 as George I, and her father had become Prince of Wales and moved to London with his family. Her father had a strained relationship with his own father, and in 1717, after a quarrel, the King had banished his son from court. He had subsequently lived at Leicester House, a large aristocratic townhouse in Westminster, where a rival court grew up, and which became a frequent meeting place for his father's political opponents. It was here that Louise was born.

She was baptised "Louisa" at Leicester House on 22 December. Her godparents were her elder sister and two cousins: Princess Amelia of Great Britain, Princess Louisa Ulrika of Prussia (for whom Sarah Lennox, Duchess of Richmond and Lennox, stood proxy), and Frederick, Prince Royal of Prussia, later Frederick the Great (for whom Henry de Nassau d'Auverquerque, 1st Earl of Grantham, stood proxy).

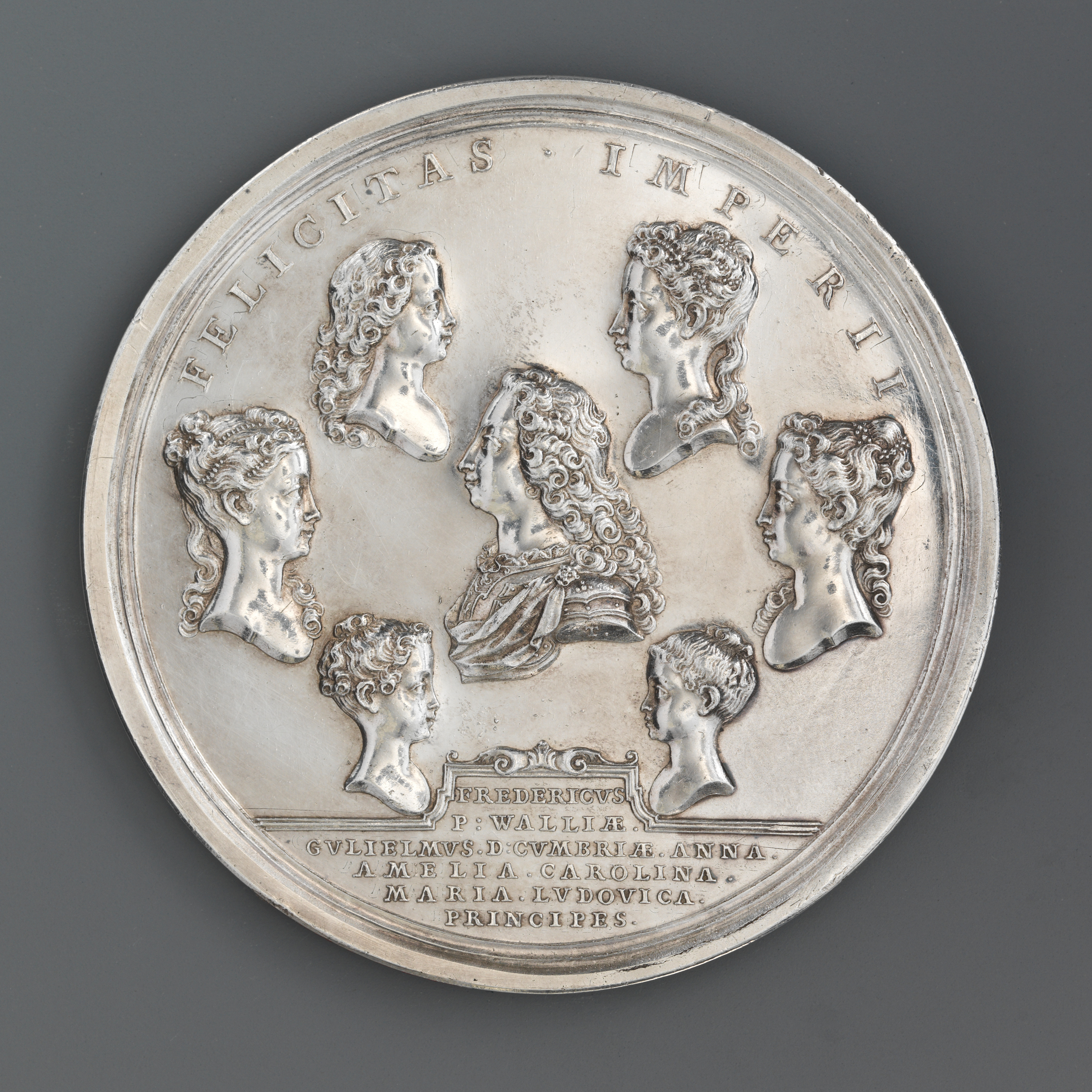
John Croker's 1732 medal showing the seven surviving children of King George II, Frederick, William, Anne, Amelia, Caroline, Mary, and Louisa.

Princess Louise's mother was pregnant 11 times, but lost four of the children, so Princess Louise had six older siblings who lived to adulthood. Of these, Louise lived only with the two youngest, Prince William and Princess Mary and their parents in Leicester House. They constituted the 'younger set', born in London, in contrast to the 'older set', born in Hanover, whom King George I had separated from their parents in 1717. Her favorite sister was Princess Mary, who later married Frederick II, Landgrave of Hesse-Kassel; The future marriages of the two sisters would become a basis for the many dynastic marriages between the Danish royal family and the House of Hesse-Kassel in the following generations.

On 11 June 1727, when Louise was two years old, her grandfather, George I, died, and her father ascended the throne as George II. The family subsequently moved to St James's Palace, the London residence of the British monarch. Here Louise grew up, spending holidays at her parents' summer residence, Richmond Lodge, located near the River Thames in Richmond. In 1737, when Louise was almost 13 years old, her mother, Queen Caroline, died, and she was then raised mainly by her older sister, Princess Caroline.

== Marriage ==
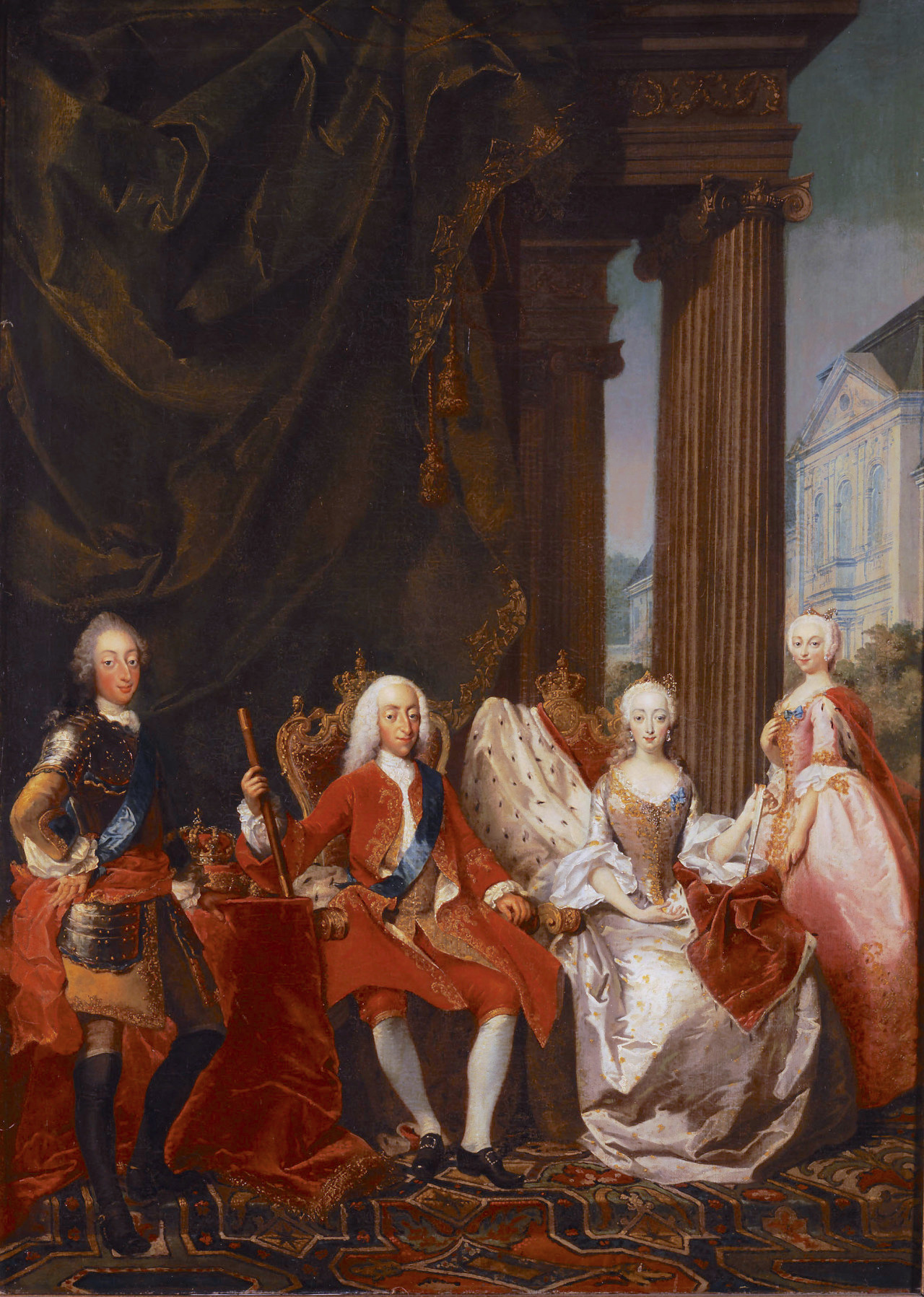
King Christian VI with his family Queen Sophie Magdalene, Crown Prince Frederick (V), and Crown Princess Louise. Hirschholm Palace can be seen as a backdrop. Painting by Carl Marcus Tuscher, c. 1744 (Rosenborg Castle).

In 1743, a dynastic marriage was negotiated between Louise and Crown Prince Frederick of Denmark and Norway. The marriage was proposed by Great Britain for political reasons. At the time of the marriage, both France and Great Britain wished to make an alliance with Denmark–Norway, and being Protestant, Great Britain had the advantage of being able to make a marriage alliance. The Danish government was in favor of the proposal, while Frederick's father, King Christian VI, was initially reluctant. But he was convinced, as he hoped the marriage would lead to British support for his, or his son's, claim to the throne of Sweden. On a more personal level, there were hopes that marriage would suppress the frequent drinking and debauched behaviour of the Crown Prince. As for the Crown Prince, after having been presented with a portrait of the princess and finding her appearance appealing, and having been told of her amiability, he declared himself willing to marry Louise, all the more so as he too could see that the political circumstances made the marriage desirable.

Thus, the marriage negotiations began during the year of 1743, and were successfully concluded within a few months on 14 September. On 19 October, the 18 year old Princess Louise left London and began her journey towards Copenhagen. The Lord Chamberlain ordered the provision of supplies for the Princess, including "sets of royal bedding, portmanteaus, a travelling tea equipage, and items for Mrs. Dives and the "Fubbs" yacht: all to an estimate of £503". She first sailed aboard the royal yacht HMY Fubbs to her father's German possession, the Electorate of Hanover, where on 10 November a proxy wedding ceremony was conducted in Hanover with her brother, the Duke of Cumberland, as the representative of the groom. After this, the entourages of Louise and Frederick met in the border city of Altona in the then Danish Duchy of Holstein, where Louise met her husband for the first time a week after the wedding. There her English retinue was exchanged for a Danish one, headed by her new chamberlain Carl Juel and her Chief Court Mistress Christiane Henriette Louise Juel. Louise and Frederick then travelled together to Copenhagen, where they held their official entry into the Danish capital on 11 December to great cheers from the population. That same day a second wedding ceremony with the groom present was held in the chapel of Christiansborg Palace, the recently completed principal residence of the Danish Monarchy in central Copenhagen. Just a week later, on 18 December 1743, Louise celebrated her 19th birthday. To celebrate the birthday of the new crown princess the German poet Johann Elias Schlegel wrote a cantata.

== Crown Princess ==
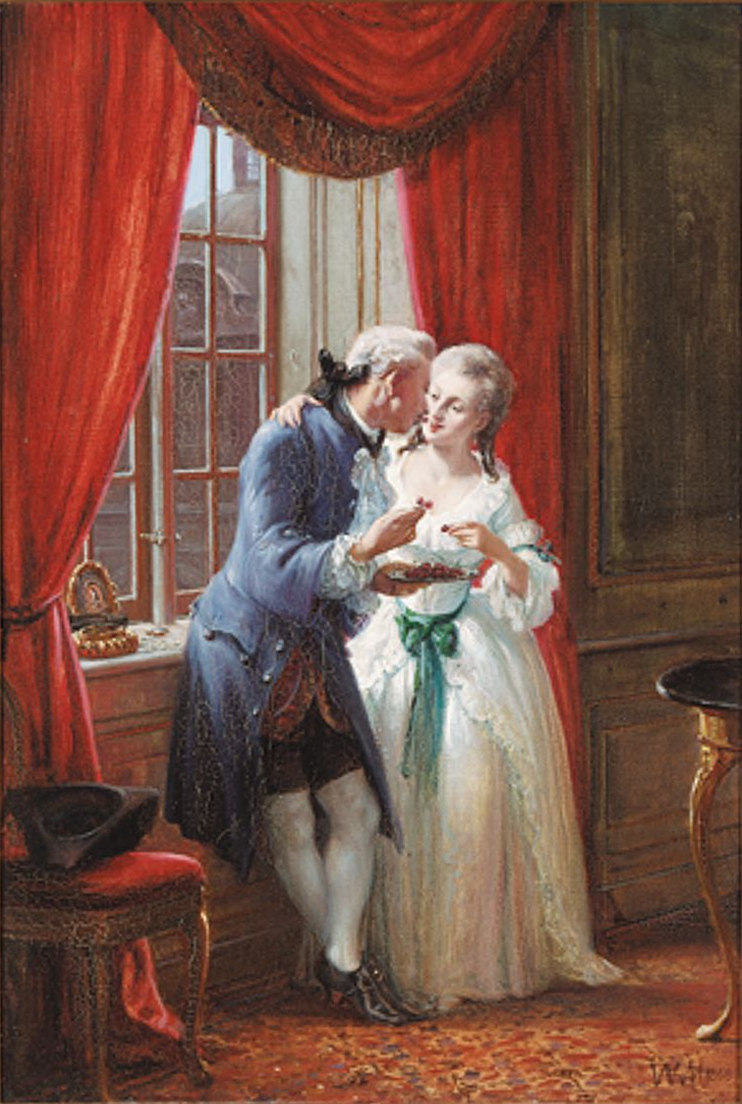
The Crown Prince and Crown Princess sharing cherries in their apartment at Charlottenborg Palace, a scene described by Charlotte Dorothea Biehl. History painting by Wilhelm Marstrand, 1868.

After the wedding, the newlyweds initially took up residence at Charlottenborg Palace, (Note: Today, the Charlottenborg Palace serves as the base of the Royal Danish Academy of Fine Arts.) a Baroque style minor residence of the Danish royal family located at Copenhagen's largest square, Kongens Nytorv. Here, their home quickly became the setting for a lively and entertaining court which differed greatly from the rigid and heavy etiquette that prevailed at the court of Louise's in-laws at Christiansborg Palace. They lived there until, in 1745, they could move into the completed Prince's Mansion, (Note: Today, the Prince's Mansion houses the National Museum of Denmark.) a city mansion remodeled for them by the Danish architect and royal building master Nicolai Eigtved in Rococo style, and located just across the Frederiksholm's Canal from Christiansborg Palace.

Although the marriage was arranged, the couple got along quite well, and at least during the first years, their relationship was apparently amicable. The couple had five children, of whom the eldest son, the heir to the throne Crown Prince Christian, did not survive infancy. Although Frederick came to feel high regard for her and always treated her with kindness, he reportedly was not in love with her and continued his debauched lifestyle. However Frederick was comfortable with her, and Louise pretended not to notice his adultery and random liaisons with others, notably with his favorite mistress Else Hansen.

Louise quickly made herself popular in the Danish court, and her father-in-law remarked that she seemed to him to be kind and agreeable. She was also met with great enthusiasm from the citizens of Copenhagen, due to her natural and straightforward behavior. Unlike her mother-in-law, Queen Sophie Magdalene, she made an effort to learn Danish, and studied the Danish language right from her arrival under the court priest Erik Pontoppidan. She also hired teachers so that her children could learn to speak their country's language.

== Queenship ==
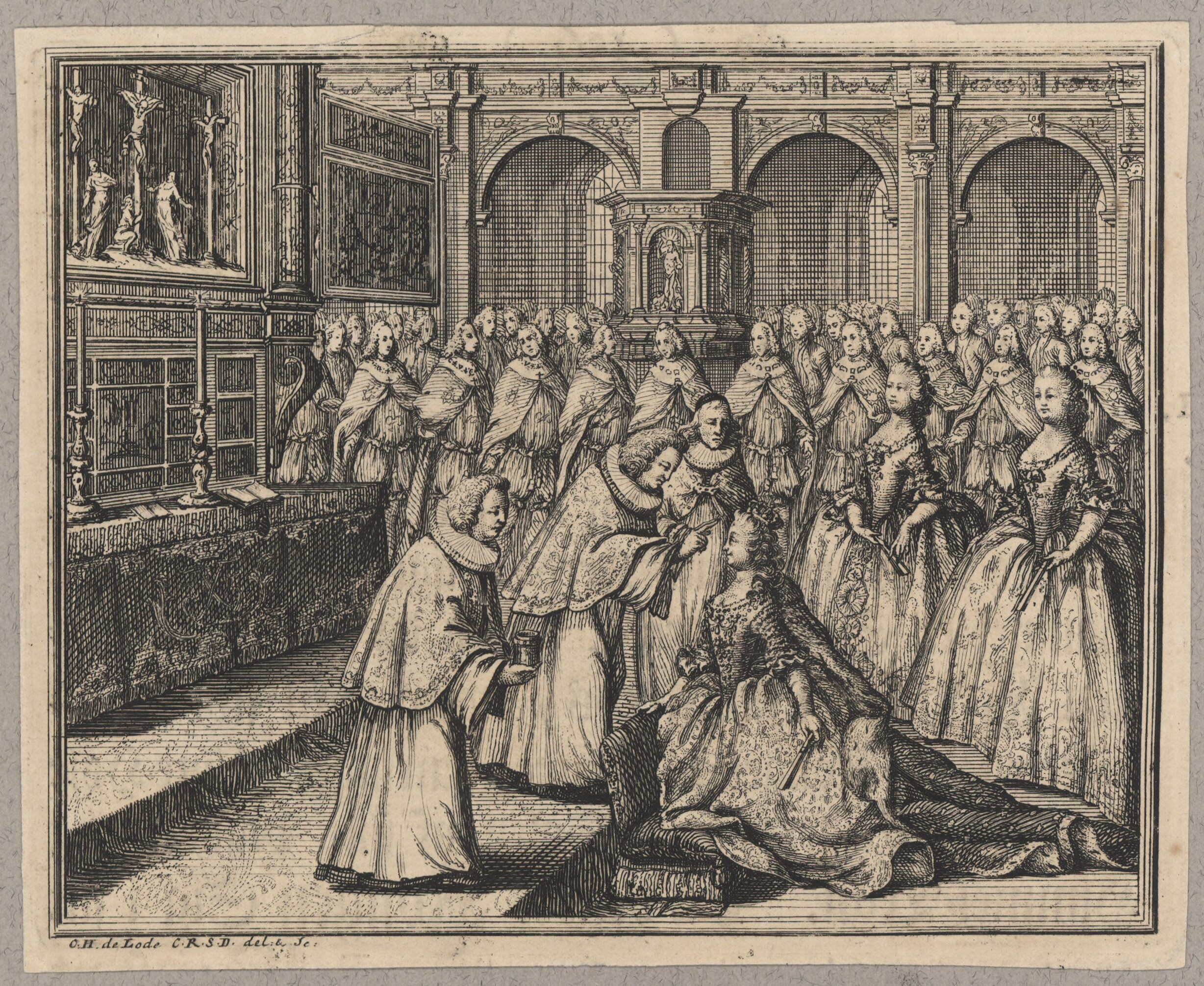
The anointment of Queen Louise in Frederiksborg Palace

At the death of Christian VI on 6 August 1746, her husband ascended the throne as King Frederick V, and Louise became Queen of Denmark and Norway at the age of 21. The new king and queen then moved the short distance from the Prince's Mansion across the Frederiksholm's Canal into the large Christiansborg Palace. The ceremonies of the accession to the throne were concluded as the new king and queen were solemnly anointed in the chapel of Frederiksborg Palace on 4 September the following year.

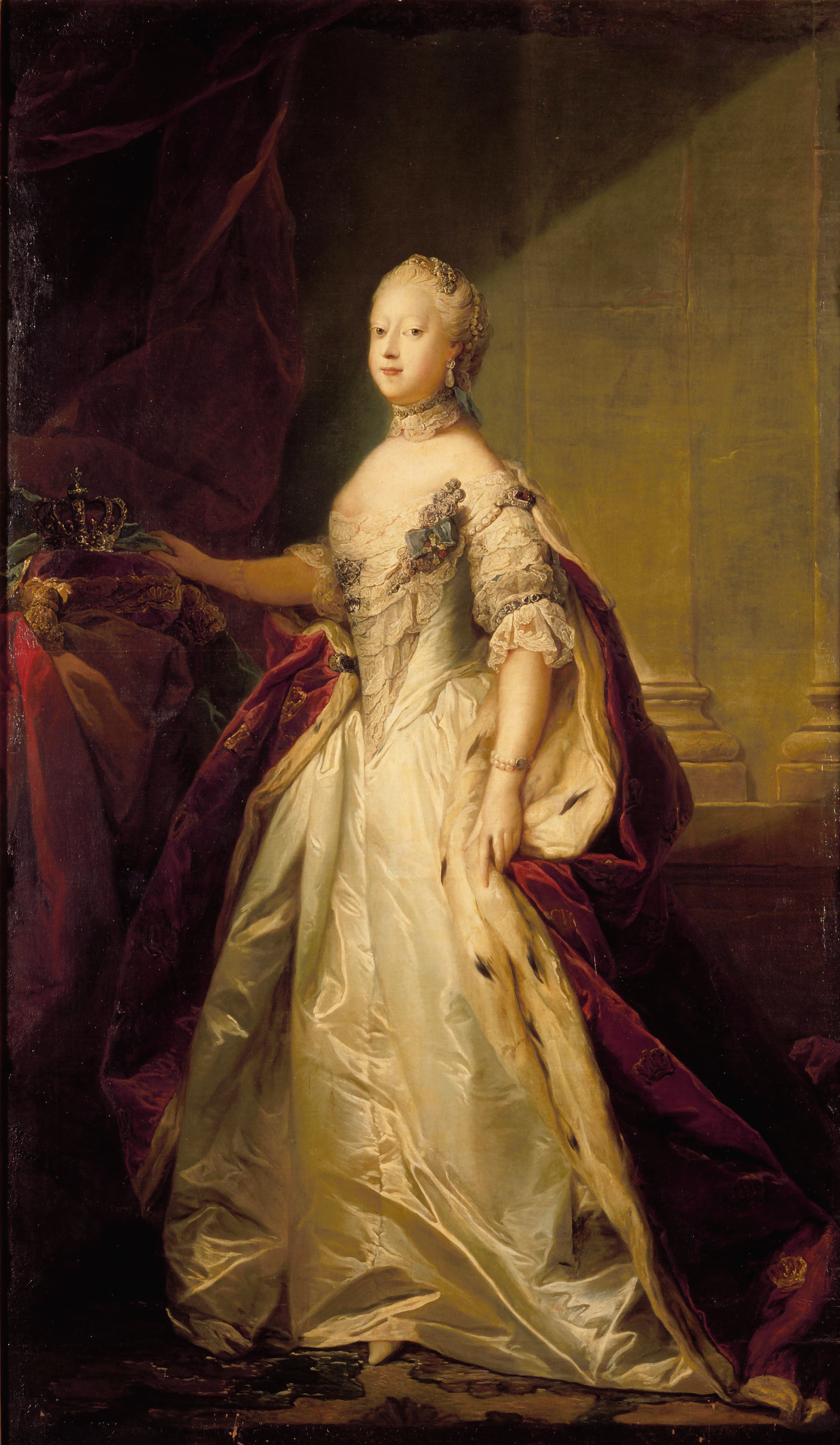
Portrait of Queen Louise by Carl Gustaf Pilo, c. 1745 (Rosenborg Castle)

What Louise and her husband on a small scale had begun at Charlottenborg Palace and the Prince's Mansion, they now continued at a larger scale at Christiansborg. Indeed, Frederick V's accession to the throne brought about a great change in life at the Danish court, which now became far more festive and acquired a more easy-going tone than under Louise's strictly religious parents-in-law. Almost as a sign of the new times, the heavy iron chains that had previously surrounded Christiansborg to keep the people at distance disappeared, court life regained its luster, and the palace's halls and salons once again became the setting for balls and social gatherings. Queen Louise was very popular in Denmark, and the great popularity of the royal couple has been attributed to Louise. Louise had a vivacious personality, allowing her to socialise easily with others. She was described as well educated and good at conversation, not beautiful but very dignified and well suited to her role as queen. A Swedish diplomat stationed in Denmark described her as follows:

She has good sense and is easy with words, friendly in tone, knows how to converse on many subjects and can speak several languages; while giving court, she seldom leaves anyone without saying something nice; she very much enjoys dance and dances well, she has a good temper and is known for her piety and excellent qualities. She finds pleasure in reading and music, she plays the clavichord well and teaches her daughters to sing.

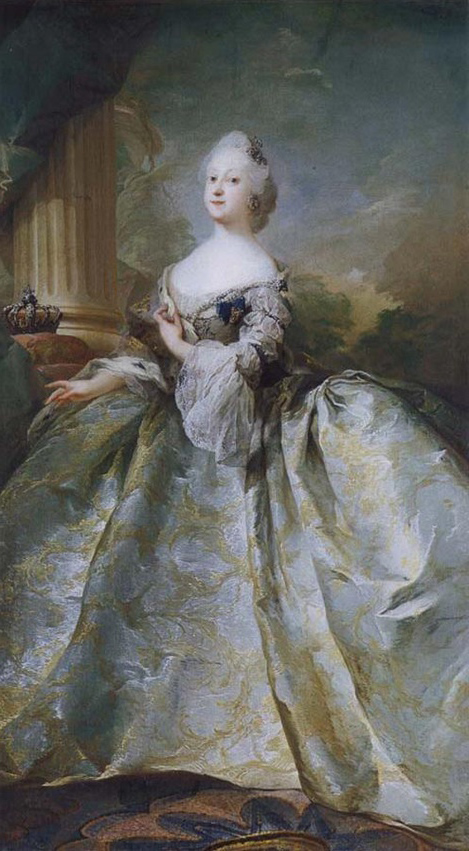
Portrait by court painter C.G. Pilo, 1751 (National Gallery of Denmark)

Her effort to speak the Danish language, including with her children, was much appreciated, as the royal Danish court spoke mostly German. The Dano-Norwegian writer Ludvig Holberg thus wrote in one of his epistles:

It is impossible to describe with what sincere Pleasure a common man hears Her Majesty, though an English Princess, to speak Danish with the Royal Children.

Interested in music, dance and theatre, she arranged in 1747 for the Italian opera company of Pietro Mingotti to be invited to Copenhagen, where they performed opera and ballet for the court at Charlottenborg Palace until 1750. Its members included the composer Christoph Willibald Gluck, who stayed with the Danish court from 1748 to 1749. At the occasion of the Queen's birth of an heir to the throne, Crown Prince Christian, he composed the opera La Contesa dei Numi ("The Contention of the Gods"), in which the Olympian Gods gather at the banks of the Great Belt and discuss who in particular should protect the new prince. It was first performed on 12 March 1749 at Charlottenborg on the occasion of the Queen's first church service after the birth. In 1748, the French theatrical troupe Du Londel Troupe under the leadership of Jeanne Du Londel was invited for dramatic performances to Copenhagen, where they performed until 1753, and also performed in Oslo in Norway during the king's stay there in 1749.

In 1751, Queen Louise unsuccessfully opposed the planned dynastic marriage between her daughter, the five-year-old Princess Sophie Magdalene, and the heir apparent to the Swedish throne, Crown Prince Gustav, the later King Gustav III. She feared that her daughter would not be treated well by the queen of Sweden, Louisa Ulrika. Queen Louisa Ulrika was known for her anti-Danish views and for being opposed to the match, and it was known that she was the real ruler at the Swedish court. Reportedly, Louise also disliked arranged marriages because of her own experience.

== Early death ==
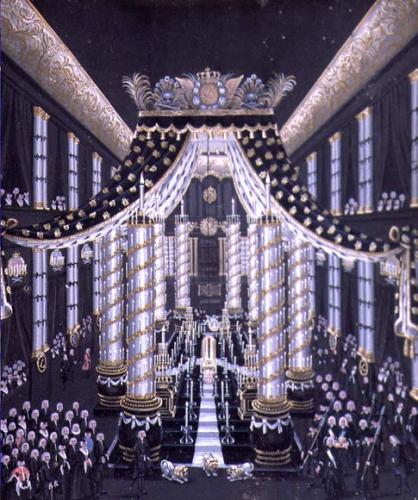
Queen Louise's catafalque in the Christiansborg Palace Chapel.

That same year, Louise became seriously ill with a pinched umbilical hernia while pregnant with her sixth child. The court surgeon operated on her but could not save her life, nor that of her unborn child. She died at Christiansborg Palace on 19 December 1751, the day after her 27th birthday, after 8 years of marriage and after just 5 years as queen. The news of the popular queen's death was met with dismay at court and sincere mourning among the people who had come to appreciate their queen immensely during her short tenure. After lying in state with great pomp at the chapel at Christiansborg Palace in Copenhagen, she was interred in Roskilde Cathedral on the island of Zealand, the traditional burial site for Danish monarchs since the 15th century.

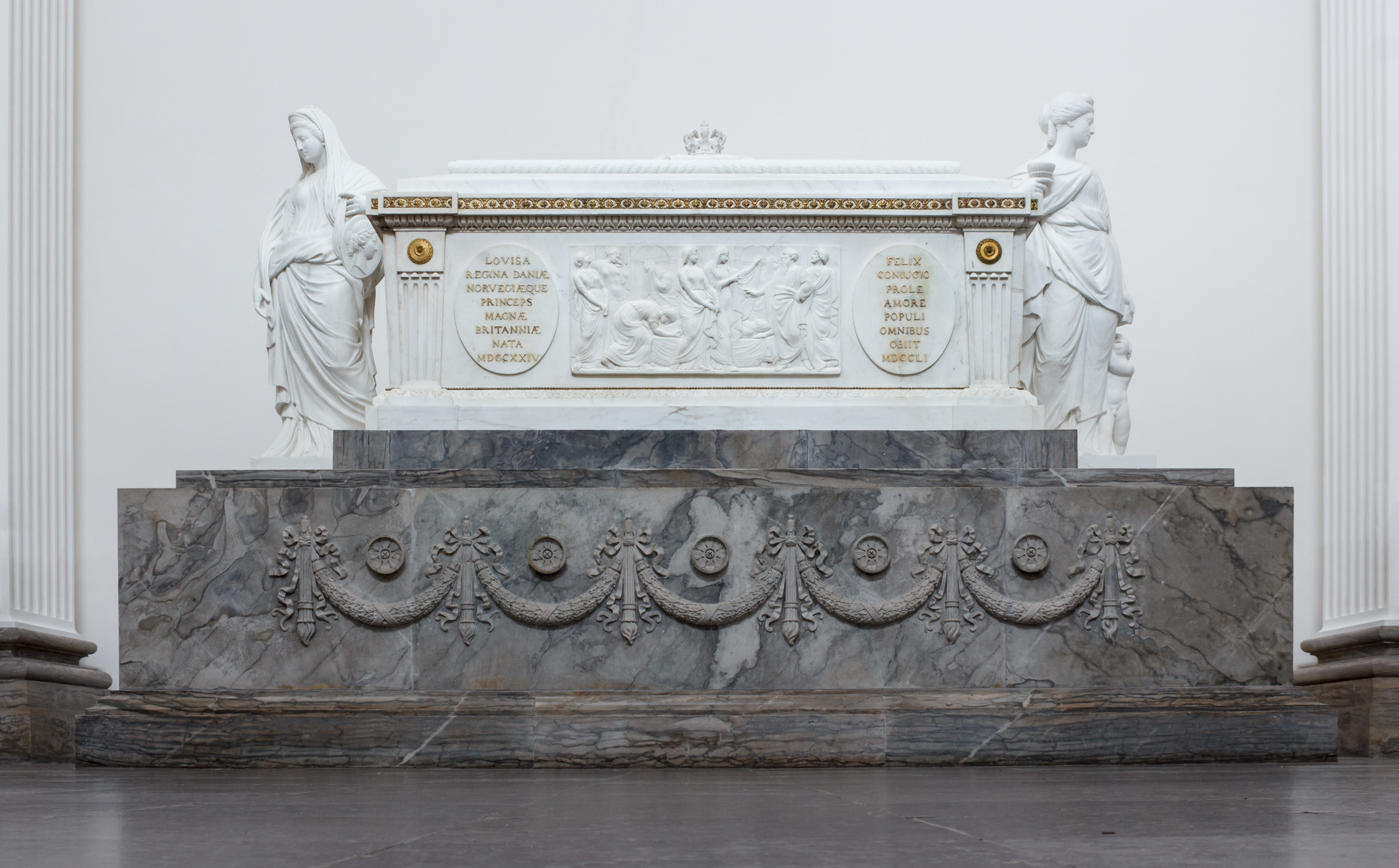
Queen Louise's sarcophagus in Roskilde Cathedral, designed by the English sculptor Carl Frederik Stanley.

Frederick V survived Queen Louise by 14 years. Although initially unwilling to remarry a foreign princess, unless it was with an English princess, none of whom were available at the time, a new marriage for the king was arranged by Count Adam Gottlob von Moltke, who thought it best that the king remarry as soon as possible. Thus, the king's second marriage took place at the chapel of Fredensborg Palace on 8 July 1752 to Frederick the Great of Prussia's sister-in-law Duchess Juliana Maria of Brunswick-Wolfenbüttel, daughter of Ferdinand Albert II, Duke of Brunswick-Wolfenbüttel. The marriage was frowned upon by the people who saw it as too early for the King to remarry. Neither did the formal princess appeal to his own taste, and with the court she was never popular — with no other identifiable cause than her sense of rigid etiquette, practised in German princely courts, that may have seemed less friendly than the English Louise.

In 1756, Louise's sister, Mary, who was estranged from her husband, Landgrave Frederick II of Hesse-Kassel, moved to Denmark to take care of her deceased sister's children. She brought her four sons with her, who were brought up at the Danish court. The two elder sons, Prince William and Prince Charles, would later marry their Danish cousins, Princess Wilhelmina and Princess Louise, while the two younger, Charles and Frederick would remain and have careers in Denmark.

== Legacy ==
Because she was extremely popular and loved by the Danes, the memory of the young queen became more and more glorified over time. An example of this glorification is the German poet Friedrich Gottlieb Klopstock, who felt great devotion and esteem for Queen Louise; he was deeply moved by her hardships and early death and vented his own and the people's feelings in the ode An den König (later called Die Königin Luise) from 1752. Compared to this ideal, the following queens, both her husband's second wife Juliana Maria and her niece and later daughter-in-law Caroline Matilda, were so much more harshly judged.

=== Namesakes ===
- Louisa County located in the Commonwealth of Virginia was named for Princess Louise in 1742.

== Arms ==
On 30 August 1727, as a child of the sovereign, Louise was granted use of the arms of the realm without the inescutcheon containing the Imperial Crown of the Holy Roman Empire, differenced by a label argent of three points, each bearing torteaux gules.

Coat of arms from 30 August 1727	Coat of arms of Queen Louise	Monogram as Queen Louise

== Issue ==
Name	Birth	Death	Notes
Christian, Crown Prince of Denmark	Copenhagen, 7 July 1745	Frederiksborg, 3 June 1747	Died in infancy
Princess Sophia Magdalena of Denmark	3 July 1746	21 August 1813	Married, 1766, Gustav III of Sweden; had issue
Princess Wilhelmina Caroline of Denmark	10 July 1747	19 January 1820	Married, 1763, William I, Elector of Hesse; had issue
Christian VII of Denmark	29 January 1749	13 March 1808	Married, 1766, Princess Caroline Matilda of Wales; had issue
Princess Louise of Denmark	30 January 1750	12 January 1831	Married, 1766, Prince Charles of Hesse-Kassel; had issue

== Ancestry ==
Ancestors of Louise of Great Britain

8. Ernest Augustus, Elector of Hanover
4. George I of Great Britain
9. Princess Sophia of the Palatinate
2. George II of Great Britain
10. George William, Duke of Brunswick-Lüneburg
5. Duchess Sophia Dorothea of Brunswick-Celle
11. Éléonore Desmier d'Olbreuse
1. Louisa of Great Britain
12. Albert II, Margrave of Brandenburg-Ansbach
6. John Frederick, Margrave of Brandenburg-Ansbach
13. Countess Sophie Margarete of Oettingen-Oettingen
3. Princess Caroline of Brandenburg-Ansbach
14. John George I, Duke of Saxe-Eisenach
7. Princess Eleonore Erdmuthe of Saxe-Eisenach
15. Johannetta, Countess of Sayn-Altenkirchen

== See also ==
- History of Denmark

== Notes ==
Louise of Great Britain House of Hanover Cadet branch of the House of Welf Born: 18 December 1724 Died: 19 December 1751
Royal titles
Preceded by Sophia Magdalene of Brandenburg-Kulmbach	Queen consort of Denmark and Norway; 1746–1751	Vacant Title next held by Juliana Maria of Brunswick-Wolfenbüttel
