= Rosa Dorothea Ritter =

Rosa Dorothea Ritter (29 July 1759 – 13 January 1833), also called Rosette Ritter and Baroness of Lindenthal after 1783, was a German woman who was the second mistress of William I, Elector of Hesse from 1779 until 1788. She was an ancestor of the Barons of Haynau.

== Biography ==
Rosa was the daughter of the apothecary Johann Georg Ritter and his wife Maria Magdalena Witz. She replaced Charlotte Christine Buissine.

William bought Rosa a property in Hanau and a country estate in the Rheingau and had her ennobled by the Holy Roman Emperor in Vienna. On 17 March 1783, the Emperor elevated them to the nobility of the Empire with the Privilegium Denominandi. William gave Rosa the Lindenthal estate near Wiesbaden, after which she called herself Freifrau von Lindenthal.

== Issue ==
With William I, Elector of Hesse, she had eight children, seven of whom lived to adulthood:

- Wilhelm Karl von Haynau (24 December 1779 – 21 January 1856)
- George Wilhelm von Haynau (27 February 1781 – February 1813)
- Philipp Ludway von Haynau (18 May 1782 – 5 June 1843)
- Wilhelmine von Haynau (20 July 1783 – 27 May 1866)
- Moritz von Haynau (4 July 1784 – 9 September 1812)
- Marie Sophie von Haynau (11 September 1785 – 21 April 1865)
- Julius Jacob von Haynau (14 October 1786 – 14 March 1853)
- Otto von Haynau (12 June 1788 – before 24 May 1792), died in childhood

The surviving children were all legitimized on 10 March 1800 and made Barons of Haynau.

In 1788, William hypocritically accused Rosa, who had been constantly pregnant with his children for most of the last decade, of infidelity and banished her to Babenhausen Castle. He replaced her with Karoline von Schlotheim. There, on 13 February 1794, Rosa married her guardian, Johann Georg Kleinhans (d. 17 February 1835), who later became Councilor of the Grand Duchy of Hesse, and was thereby released.
