= Karoline von Schlotheim =

German noblewoman (1766–1847)

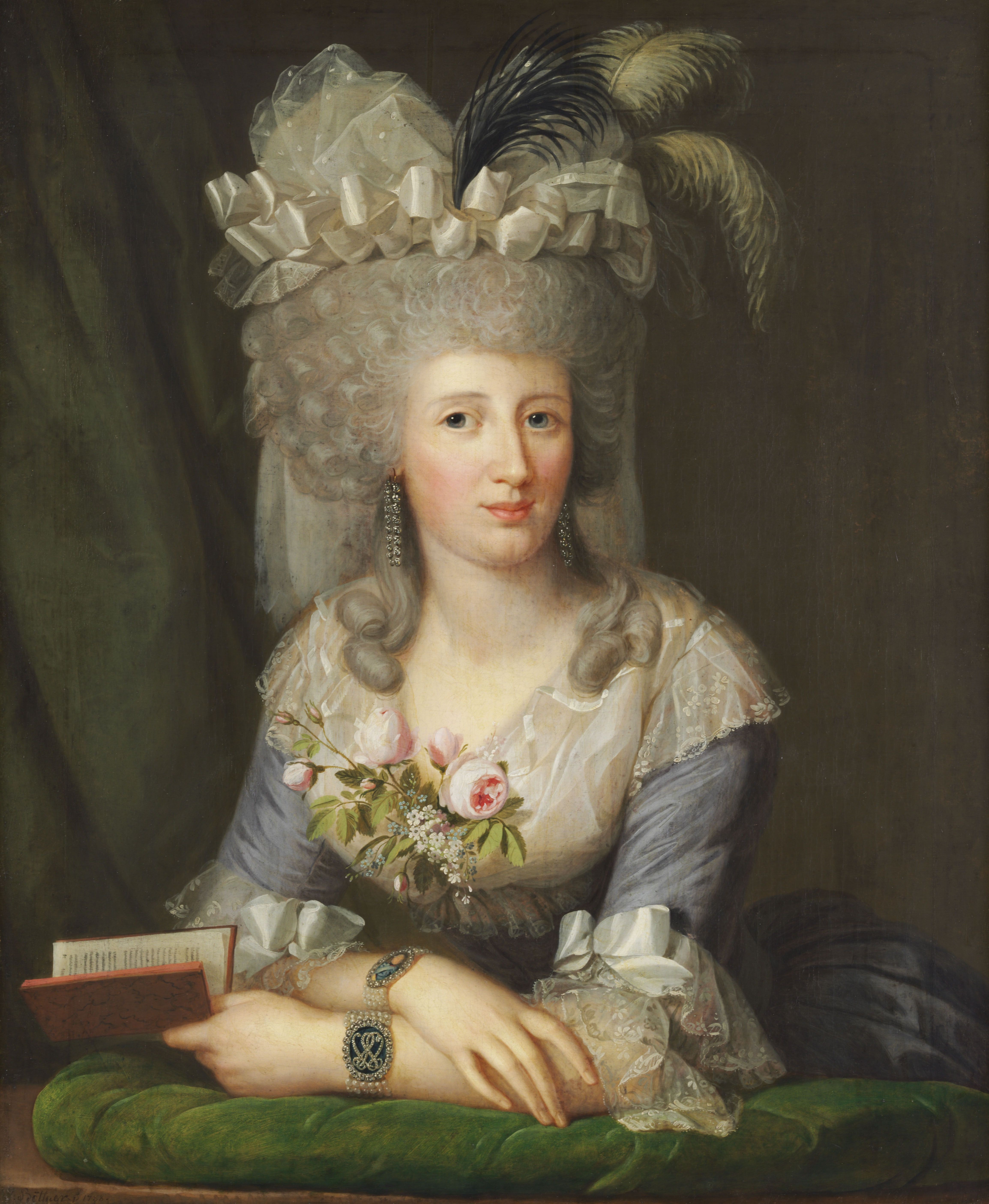
Karoline von Schlotheim in 1788 by Wilhelm Böttner.

Karoline von Schlotheim (6 July 1766 - 7 January 1847) was a German noblewoman who was the third and final mistress of William I, Elector of Hesse from 1788 until 1811.

== Life ==
Karoline was the daughter of General Heinrich Christian Wilhelm von Schlotheim and his wife, Friederike Most von Wilhelmsthal (d. 1799). In 1788, she was kidnapped against her will by William I, Elector of Hesse, who made her his mistress, replacing Rosa Dorothea Ritter. Karoline fled, but she was returned to the elector by her parents and later agreed to the relationship.

On 14 May 1788, William made Karoline Countess of Schlotheim, after which she used the salutation "high and well-born", and built the Löwenburg for her in 1793. William treated Karoline like his consort, and she had considerable influence, including political influence, on him and the development of the country. In 1807, she followed her de facto husband into exile and lived with him in Itzehoe, where she gave birth to their last child.

On 2 May 1811, Karoline received the title Countess of Hessenstein, which all her surviving children with the elector also received after their legitimization.

== Issue ==
With William I, Elector of Hesse, Karoline had 13 children, only five of whom lived to adulthood:

- Wilhelm Friedrich von Hessenstein (23 June 1789 – 26 April 1790), died in infancy
- Wilhelm Karl von Hessenstein (19 May 1790 – 22 March 1867), canon of Minden, Halberstadt and Cammin, Mecklenburg-Schwerin Real Privy Councilor. He married Countess Angelika von der Osten-Sacken.
- Ferdinand von Hessenstein (19 May 1791 – 15 December 1794), died in childhood
- Karoline Frederike Auguste von Hessenstein (9 June 1792 – 21 August 1797), died in childhood
- Auguste Wilhelmine von Hessenstein (22 August 1793 – 1 June 1795), died in childhood
- Ludwig Karl von Hessenstein (11 August 1794 – 17 November 1857), Prussian chamberlain. In 1818, he married Countess Auguste Wilhelmine von Pückler-Groditz (21 September 1794 - 8 November 1861).
- Friederike Auguste von Hessenstein (16 October 1795 – 13 September 1845), married Wilhelm von Steuber (29 December 1790 - 6 July 1845)
- Wilhelm Ludwig Georg von Hessenstein (28 July 1800 – 16 January 1836), Electoral Hessian Chamberlain. He first married Luise von dem Bussche-Hünnefeld (27 March 1804 - 21 May 1829) and secondly Karoline Wolff von Gudenberg (11 February 1812 – 20 August 1836).
- Friedrich Ludwig von Hessenstein (8 February 1803 – 8 September 1805), died in childhood
- Karoline von Hessenstein (16 February 1804 – 18 March 1891). In 1822, she married Carl von Stenglin (12 August 1791 - 15 March 1871).
- stillborn child (1805)
- stillborn child (1806)
- stillborn son (1807 in Itzehoe)
