= Charlotte Christine Buissine =

Charlotte Christine Buissine or Buissinne (4 April 1749 – after 1781) was a Frenchwoman who was the first mistress of William I, Elector of Hesse from 1775 until 1778.

She was the daughter of a Hanau civil servant, the farmer Henri Buissine, and his wife Charlotte Varlut, both of French descent. Prince William was then and until 1786 regent in the County of Hanau, then a secundogeniture of the Landgraviate of Hesse-Kassel.

Issue:

With William I, Elector of Hesse, Charlotte had four children, three of whom lived to adulthood:

- Wilhelm of Heimrod (16 July 1775 – 6 January 1811)
- Karl of Heimrod (19 July 1776 – 13 May 1827)
- Friedrich of Heimrod (9 August - 30 October 1777), died in infancy
- Friedrich of Heimrod (1778 – 3 September 1813)

The illegitimate children of Charlotte and William received - like their mother - the titles Freiherr/Freifrau/Freiin von Heimrod, the place of birth of the firstborn child.

She was replaced by Rosa Dorothea Ritter as William's second official mistress.

In 1781, she married Christian Friedrich Dietzsch in Friedberg, Hesse.
