= Lisbeth Cathrine Amalie Rose =

Danish actress

- Born: Lisbeth Cathrine Amalie Böttger; 25 September 1738; Copenhagen, Denmark
- Died: 23 February 1793 (aged 54); Gentofte, Denmark
- Occupations: Actress, teacher
- Years active: 1752 — 1792
- Spouse: Christopher Pauli Rose
- Parent: Matthias Böttger

Lisbeth Cathrine Amalie Rose née Böttger (25 September 1738 – 23 February 1793) was a Danish actress, one of the first professional native actresses in Denmark, and also referred to as the greatest actress in 18th century Denmark. She was also a translator and a playwright.

== Biography ==
Rose was the daughter of the goldsmith Matthias Böttger in Copenhagen.

In 1751, Ludvig Holberg visited her father's shop and asked her sister to work in the newly established Royal Danish Theatre, Det Kongelige, in Copenhagen; she declined, but Lisbeth asked if she could come instead. She was accepted and made her debut on the stage as Pernille in Holberg's play "Kildererejsen" in 1752.

The theatre had been founded only four years earlier, and only five other actresses were employed there: Utilia Lenkiewitz, Anna Catharina Materna, Caroline Thielo and Anna Dorothea Lund. In the absence of any theatre school, Lisbeth learned from her colleagues and her own talent. When Anna Catharina Materna left the theatre in 1753 and Caroline Thielo died in 1754 she quickly rose to become the primadonna of the theatre; in 1756: she was given the same salary as Utilia Lenkiewitz and Anna Dorothea Lund, and she was the first actress to have a carriage and a private maid paid for by the theatre. Danish society was not accustomed to this degree of public exposure and the profession of actress was not yet respectable; a result was that Lisbeth acquired a reputation among her contemporaries for arrogance.

She enjoyed great popularity, but also experienced great pressure, being given parts in everything from comedy to tragedy, from both Danish and French plays; until 1760, she was also a dancer, as no distinction had yet arisen between actors and dancers in Denmark. She translated plays from French and German to Danish for the theatre, and she also wrote plays; her first play had its first performance in 1772 with herself in the leading role. In 1762, the theatre school was founded and she became the first female instructor; among her pupils were Caroline Halle-Müller, who became a famous actress in both Denmark and Sweden.

In 1779 she married her colleague Christopher Pauli Rose, with whom she had had an affair long before. He died in 1784. She gave her last performance in 1792 and died the year after in poverty: the theatre had to pay for her funeral.

== Sources ==
- Jørgensen, Lisbet: Rose, Lisbeth Cathrine Amalie. Dansk Kvindebiografisk Leksikon (in Danish). Retrieved on 5 August 2007.
- http://bjoerna.dk/Holberg/Brandes-2007-Biografier-Extra.htm#A(nna?)%20D(orothea?)%20Lund
