= Utilia Lenkiewitz =

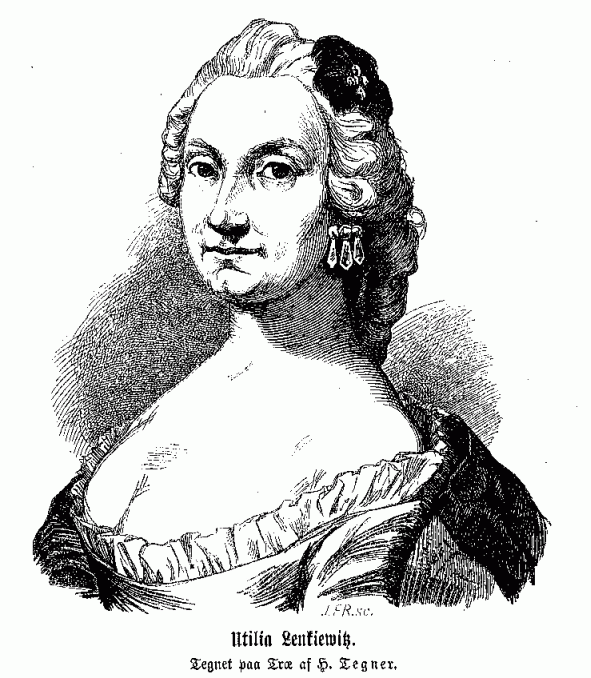
- Born: Utilia van Mander; 1711; Denmark
- Died: September 23, 1770 (aged c. 59); Denmark
- Spouse(s): Adam Lenkiewitz, 1749 - her death

Utilia Lenkiewitz (née Utilia van Mander) (1711 – September 23, 1770) was a Danish actress, one of the first of her profession from Denmark, and a member of the pioneer-troupe of the Royal Danish Theatre.

== Life and career ==
Born the child of the painter Karel van Mander, she was a part of one of the two native theatre troupes created when public theatrical activity became legal in Denmark in 1746, following a ban. The organist Carl August Thielo was the first to be given a theatre privilege, and he opened a theatre at Store Kongensgade in 1747; the same year, Julius Henrik von Qvoten opened one which played in both Danish and German, and Lenkiewitz is believed to have been a part of the Qvoten-troupe. The actors from the troupes of these temporary theatres were then employed as staff when the Royal Danish Theatre was opened in 1748, with Thielo as director.

Together with the other members of these troupes, Lenkiewitz belonged to Denmark's first wave of 'native' actors, and together with her female colleagues of 1747, such as Anna Dorothea Lund and Caroline Thielo she was also her country's first professional actress; during the 18th century, the theatre of Copenhagen was short of actresses because of the bad reputation of the profession; in 1753, there were only five in employment in Denmark.

She was a very versatile actor; because of the shortage, she was given all sorts of parts and was very well used up until her death. As she was the eldest of the actresses, she was also given many supporting parts as elder females in plays, which were numerous; in 1752, she was recognized for her great professionalism and usefulness. Her colleagues admired her versatility and concentration, and the audience loved her comical talent. She was highly recommended for her way of identifying herself with the part, and it was said that she became the part she played from the moment she entered the stage until she left it.

Among her most notable parts were Magdelone in Maskeraden, and Donna Olympia in Don Ranudo; she played firm old women, peasant wives, gossiping old women but also young girls such as Béline in Den indbildt syge, by Molière. The profession of acting was despised in this age, especially for women, but she herself became respected as an artist. Her last ever parts were the leading roles of Flaminia in Den coquette Enke, and Duraminte in Hver Mands Ven, in the 1769–70 season. She died of tuberculosis before the theatre opened again after the summer break of 1770. She used to say: "Nature is what makes people laugh."

== Personal life ==
She was married to the Polish actor Adam Lenkiewitz (1723–1783) from 1749 until her death. He was 12 years her junior, and she had met him in the Qvoten-troupe, but they had no children. Her husband could not speak Danish well enough to be an actor at the Royal Theatre, but he didbecome an administrator in the theatre.
