= Frederick V of Denmark =

King of Denmark and Norway from 1746 to 1766

Frederick V
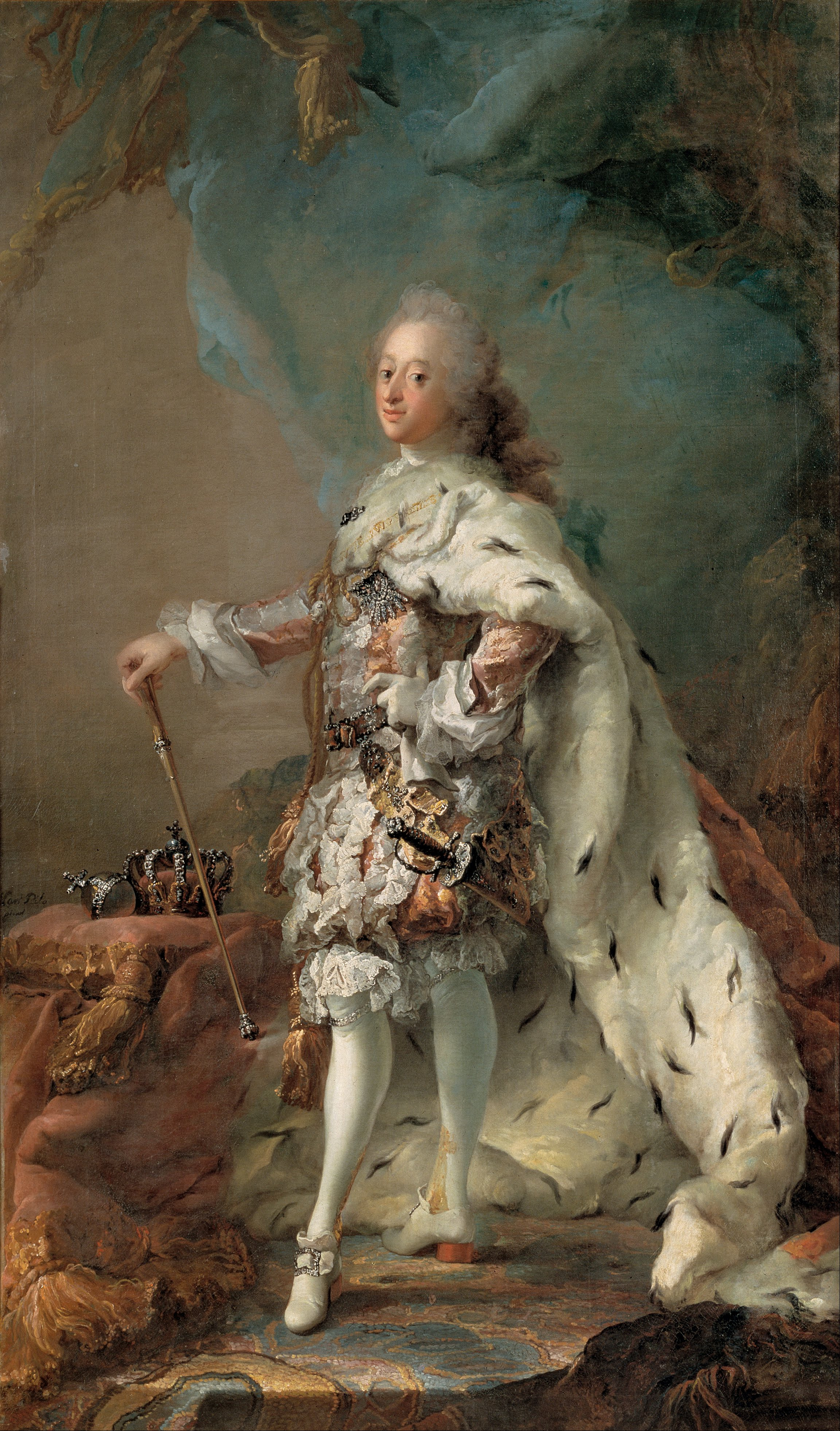
- Portrait by Carl Gustaf Pilo, c. 1748–51

King of Denmark and Norway
- Reign: 6 August 1746 – 14 January 1766
- Coronation: 4 September 1747; Frederiksborg Palace Chapel
- Predecessor: Christian VI
- Successor: Christian VII
- Chief Ministers: See list: Johan Ludvig Holstein Count Johann Hartwig Ernst von Bernstorff
- Born: 31 March 1723; Copenhagen Castle, Copenhagen, Denmark
- Died: 14 January 1766 (aged 42); Christiansborg Palace, Copenhagen, Denmark
- Burial: Roskilde Cathedral
- Spouses: Louise of Great Britain (m. 1743; died 1751); Juliana Maria of Brunswick-Wolfenbüttel (m. 1752)
- Issue: Christian, Crown Prince of Denmark; Sophia Magdalena, Queen of Sweden; Wilhelmine Caroline, Electress of Hesse; Christian VII; Louise, Princess Charles of Hesse-Kassel; Frederick, Hereditary Prince of Denmark
- House: Oldenburg
- Father: Christian VI
- Mother: Sophie Magdalene of Brandenburg-Kulmbach
- Religion: Lutheran

Frederick V (Danish and Norwegian: Frederik V; 31 March 1723 – 14 January 1766) was King of Denmark and Norway and Duke of Schleswig-Holstein from 6 August 1746 until his death in 1766. A member of the House of Oldenburg, he was the son of Christian VI of Denmark and Sophie Magdalene of Brandenburg-Kulmbach.

Although the personal influence of Frederick was limited, his reign was marked by the progress of commerce and trade, and art and science prospered under his reign. Unlike his parents who were deeply devoted to Pietism, Frederick grew into a hedonist. As regent, he took part in the conduct of government by attending council meetings, but he was afflicted by alcoholism and most of his rule was dominated by able ministers who were influenced by the ideas of the Age of Enlightenment. His ministers marked his reign by the progress of commerce and the emerging industry. They also avoided involving Denmark–Norway in the European wars of his time. Although Frederick V wasn't personally interested in cultural affairs, his first wife was, and the public entertainment and freedom of expression that had been banned during his father's reign was again permitted.

== Early years ==
=== Birth and family ===
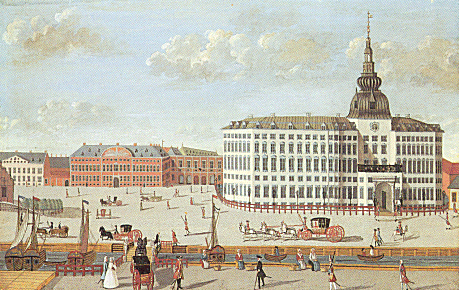
Frederick's birthplace, the Copenhagen Castle, c. 1730.

Prince Frederick was born between 10 and 11 in the evening on 31 March 1723. He was the grandson of King Frederick IV of Denmark and Norway and the only son of Crown Prince Christian and Sophie Magdalene of Brandenburg-Kulmbach. Frederick was the last Danish prince to be born in the then antiquated and overextended Copenhagen Castle, which dated from the late 14th century, and had assumed a monstrous appearance and started to crumble under its own weight after several extensions. Demolition of the castle began in 1731 to make way for a more adequate royal residence, the vast Baroque style Christiansborg Palace, from where Frederick would eventually reign. The young prince was baptized the following day in the Crown Princess's Bedchamber by the royal confessor Christen Lemvig, and was named after his grandfather, King Frederick IV.

As the Crown Prince's only son, Frederick was destined to rule from birth. A younger sister died in infancy in 1724, and his only surviving sister, Princess Louise, was born in 1726. On 12 October 1730, King Frederick IV died and Frederick's father ascended the throne as King Christian VI. Frederick himself became Crown Prince at the age of seven.

=== Upbringing and education ===
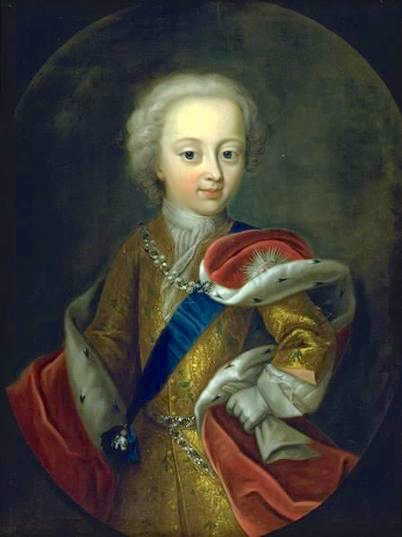
Prince Frederick as a child wearing the blue sash of the Order of the Elephant.

Christian VI and Queen Sophie Magdalene were deeply devoted to Pietism, a movement within Lutheranism that combines its emphasis on biblical doctrine with an emphasis on individual piety and living a vigorous Christian life. As a consequence, Frederick was given a strictly religious upbringing. At the age of 7, he received his own royal household with the German nobleman Georg Wilhelm von Söhlenthal as his hofmeister. Söhlenthal was an ardent supporter of the Moravian Brethren, and his home was the center of the pietistic circles in Copenhagen. He shared a deep religious piety with the king, and for a time he was Christian VI's adviser on ecclesiastical matters. However, Söhlenthal did not succeed in influencing the spiritual development of the Crown Prince, as he was an overly gentle and weak character, and in 1738 he was dismissed from his position as hofmeister.

Frederick's education became rather deficient. In 1730 the king entrusted the significant and well-educated privy councillor Iver Rosenkrantz supervision of Crown Prince Frederick's upbringing, but this had no influence on the actual teaching. Rosenkrantz was a supporter of the traditional Lutheran orthodoxy, while Christian VI more and more became a proponent of Pietism and lost confidence in Rosenkrantz. The Crown Prince's education was therefore completely carried out in the German Pietist spirit that prevailed at court. Like his ancestors at the then primarily German-speaking court in Copenhagen, he only had a poor command of the Danish language, and knew German better than Danish all his life. None the less, his mother ironically referred to him as "Der Dänische Prinz" (literally The Danish Prince in German) because he occasionally spoke Danish. Apart from a certain interest in coin collecting, he only had modest cultural or intellectual interests.

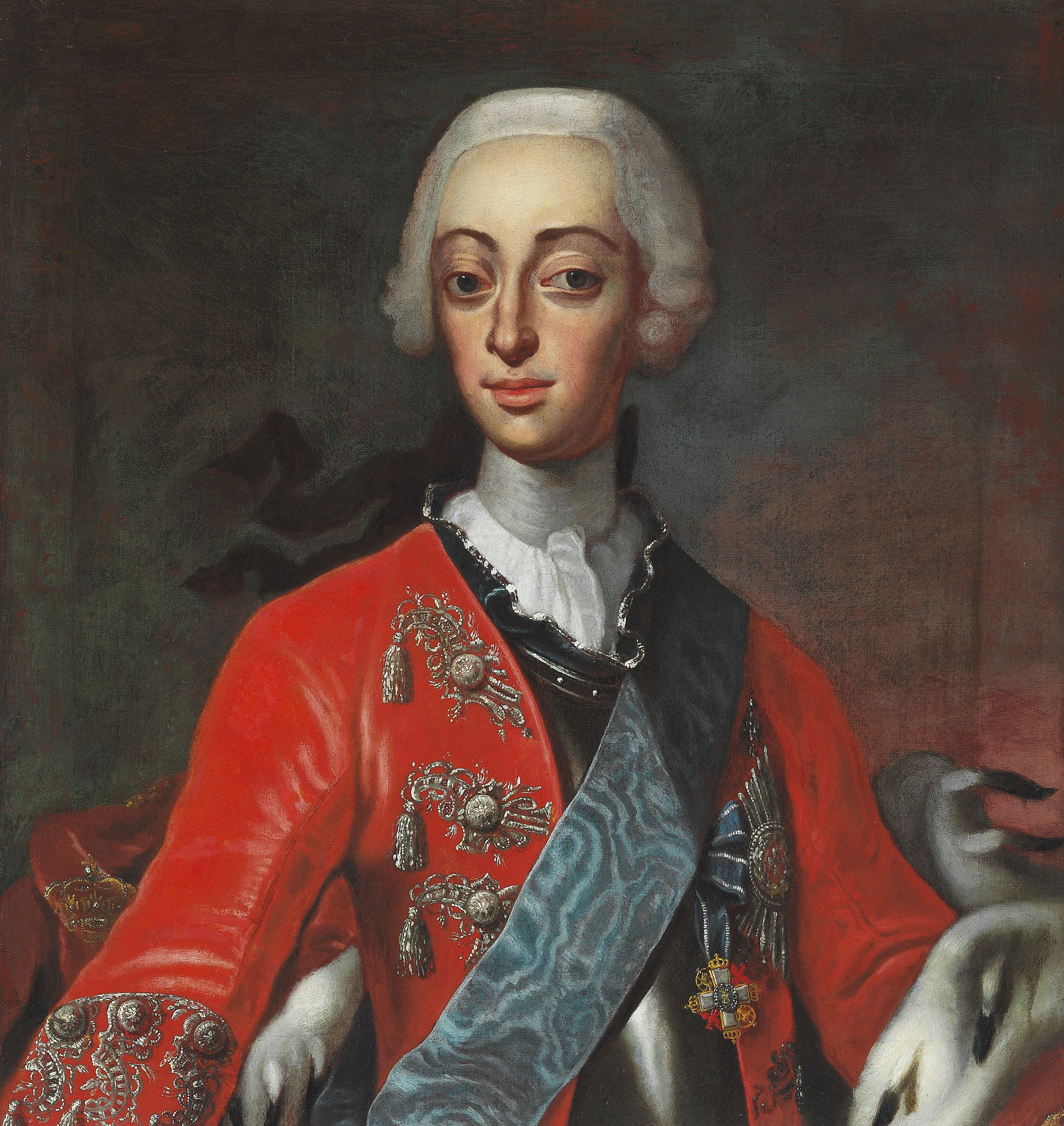
Crown Prince Frederick in the uniform of the Royal Horse Guards. Portrait by Andreas Møller, probably c. 1740.

Prince Frederick proved himself from an early age to have a completely different nature from his strict and somewhat gloomy parents. He was gentle and kind in nature, cheerful and accessible to everyone, and wanted to see his subjects happy. Unlike his secluded parents, who were rarely seen outside their palaces, he enjoyed spending time in public with people from all walks of life. Despite his upbringing in a strictly pietistic home, he was not himself gripped by pietism. Although certainly not unfamiliar with religious sentiments, Frederick grew into a hedonist who enjoyed the pleasures of life such as deer stalking, wine and women.

This hedonism, however, evolved to debauchery, and Frederick became well known for a libertine lifestyle marked by sexual licentiousness and alcoholism. With a group of other rakes, he would tour the city's taverns and brothels, to an extent that his father at one point considered having him declared legally decapacitated. The King's more prudent advisers, however, spoke against it, as it would legally be a violation of the King's Law (Latin: Lex Regia; Danish: Kongeloven), the absolutist constitution of Denmark and Norway from 1665. Furthermore, it would also compromise the monarchy to an unprecedented degree to admit that the future king was unfit to rule.

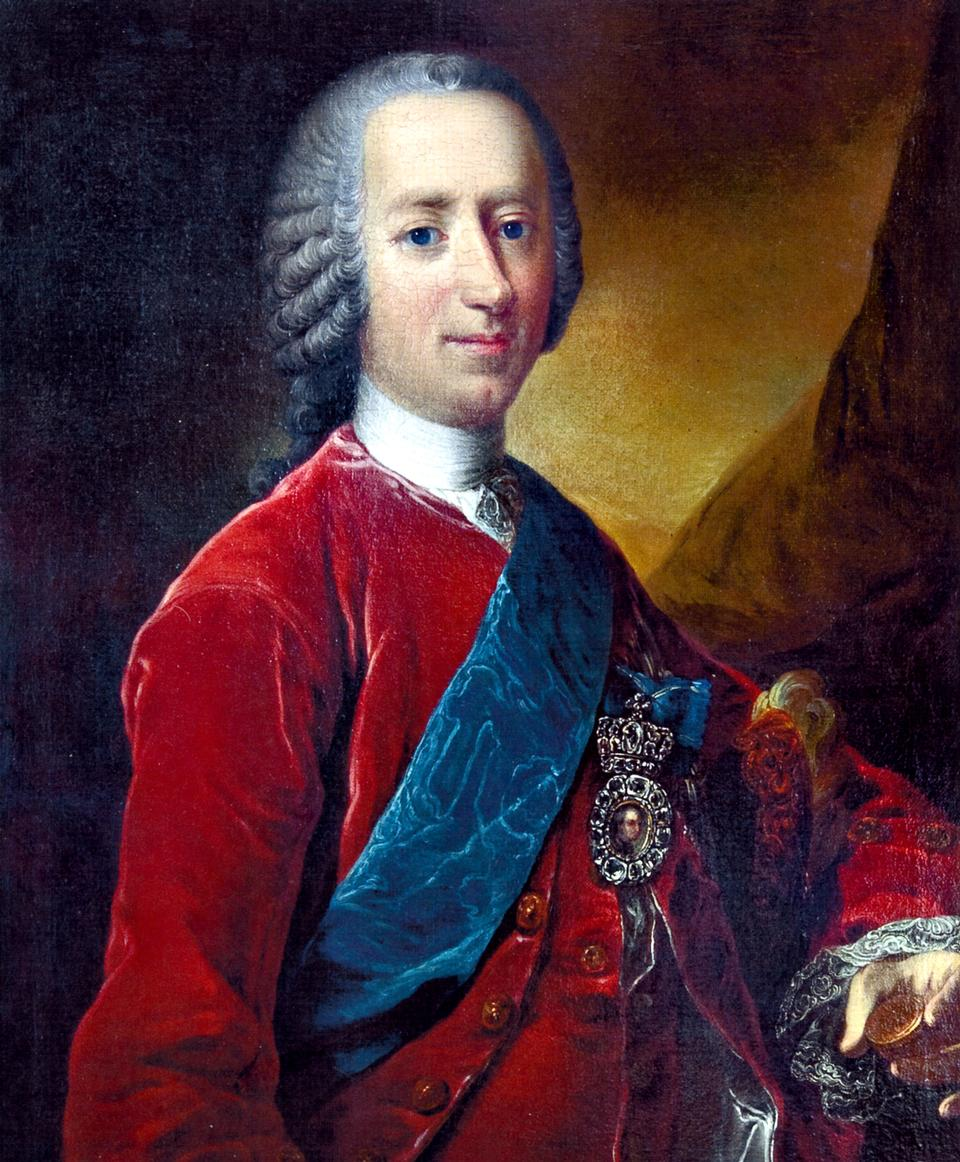
Adam Gottlob Moltke. Portrait by C.G. Pilo, 1760.

Of the outmost importance for the future of the Crown Prince and his realm, was the 1730 appointment as his chamber page of Adam Gottlob Moltke, a nineteen year old nobleman from Mecklenburg who was eleven years older than Frederick. Moltke had been a page to his father, and the King and Queen counted on Moltke to teach the Crown Prince to control himself. In 1743 Moltke was promoted to Hofmeister. In fact, Moltke did nothing to control Frederick's sexual appetite nor his alcohol consumption, but in return a lifelong relationship of trust was established between the two men, which was to become crucial after Frederick's ascension to throne.

In 1740, the Crown Prince was confirmed, and from then on as heir to the throne was given a seat in the Council of State. During the Swedish succession crisis in 1743 following the death of Queen Ulrika Eleonora of Sweden in 1741, when it was clear that no legitimate heir was to be expected, Crown Prince Frederick in 1743 had great prospects of being elected heir to the throne in Sweden. The peasantry unilaterally elected Crown Prince Frederick, and in Dalecarlia the peasants even instigated a rebellion, the Dalecarlian rebellion or stora daldansen (Swedish: the great Dalecarlian dance) to enforce his election. However, as a result of the Treaty of Åbo in 1743, which ended the Russo-Swedish War of 1741–1743, Adolf Frederick of Holstein-Gottorp was appointed heir to the throne in place of Crown Prince Frederick, after pressure from the Russian empress Elizabeth Petrovna.

=== First marriage ===
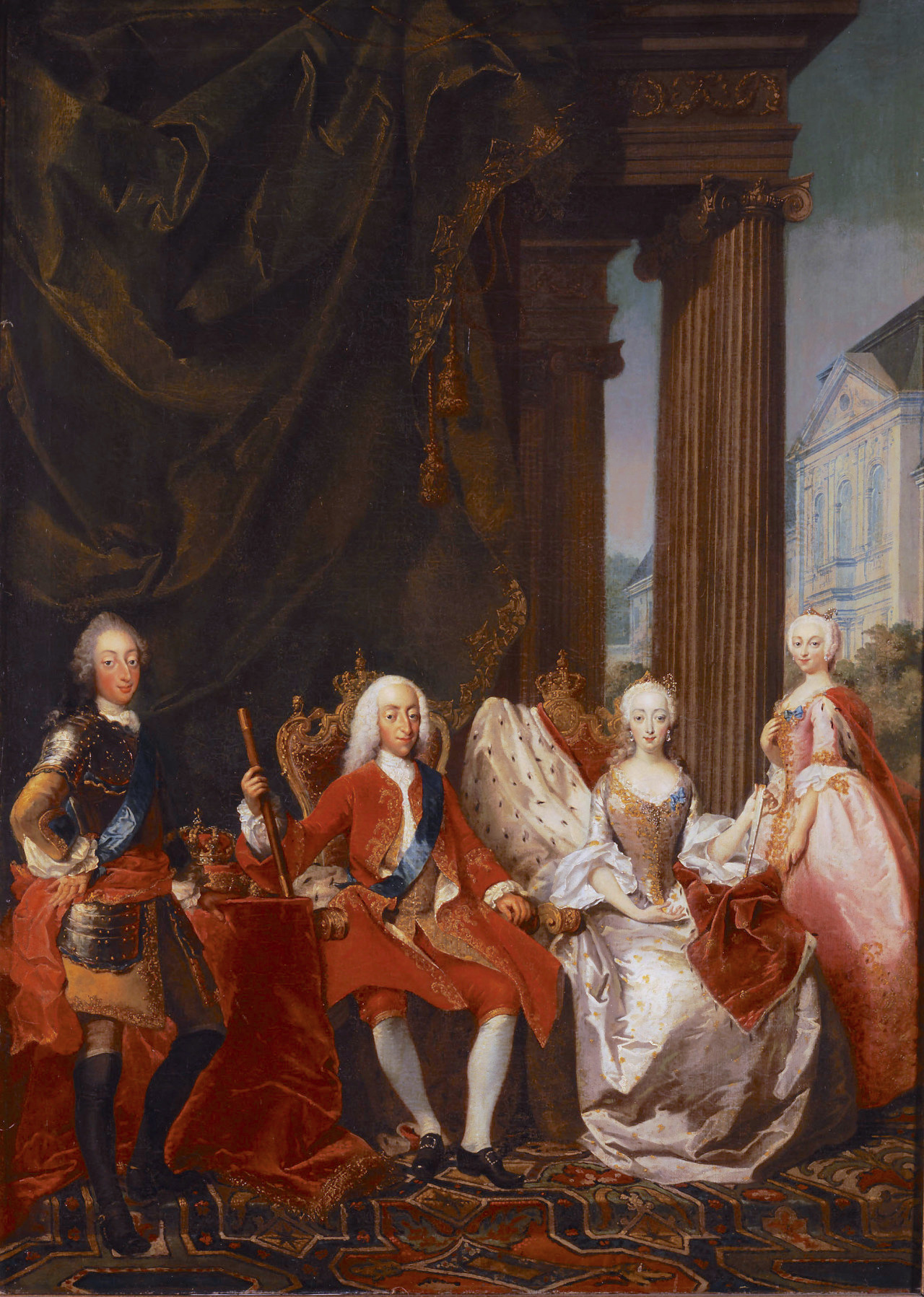
Frederick (first from left) and Louise (last from right), then crown princes of Denmark, with King Christian VI and Queen Sophie Magdalene sitting. Hirschholm Palace can be seen in the background. Painting by Marcus Tuscher c. 1744.

Crown Prince Frederick's propensity for debauchery accelerated his marriage negotiations in the hope that marriage would suppress the frequent drinking and debauched behaviour of the Crown Prince. In 1743, a dynastic marriage was negotiated between him and Princess Louise of Great Britain, the youngest daughter of King George II and Caroline of Ansbach. The marriage was proposed by Great Britain from political reasons. At the time of the marriage, both France and Great Britain wished to make an alliance with Denmark–Norway, and being protestant Great Britain had the advantage of being able to make a marriage alliance. The Danish government was in favor of the proposal, while Frederick's father, King Christian VI, was initially reluctant. But he was convinced, as he hoped the marriage would lead to British support for his son's claim to the throne of Sweden. As for the Crown Prince, after having been presented with a portrait of the princess and finding her exterior appealing, and having been told of her amiability, he declared himself willing to marry Louise, all the more so as he too could see that the political circumstances made the marriage desirable.

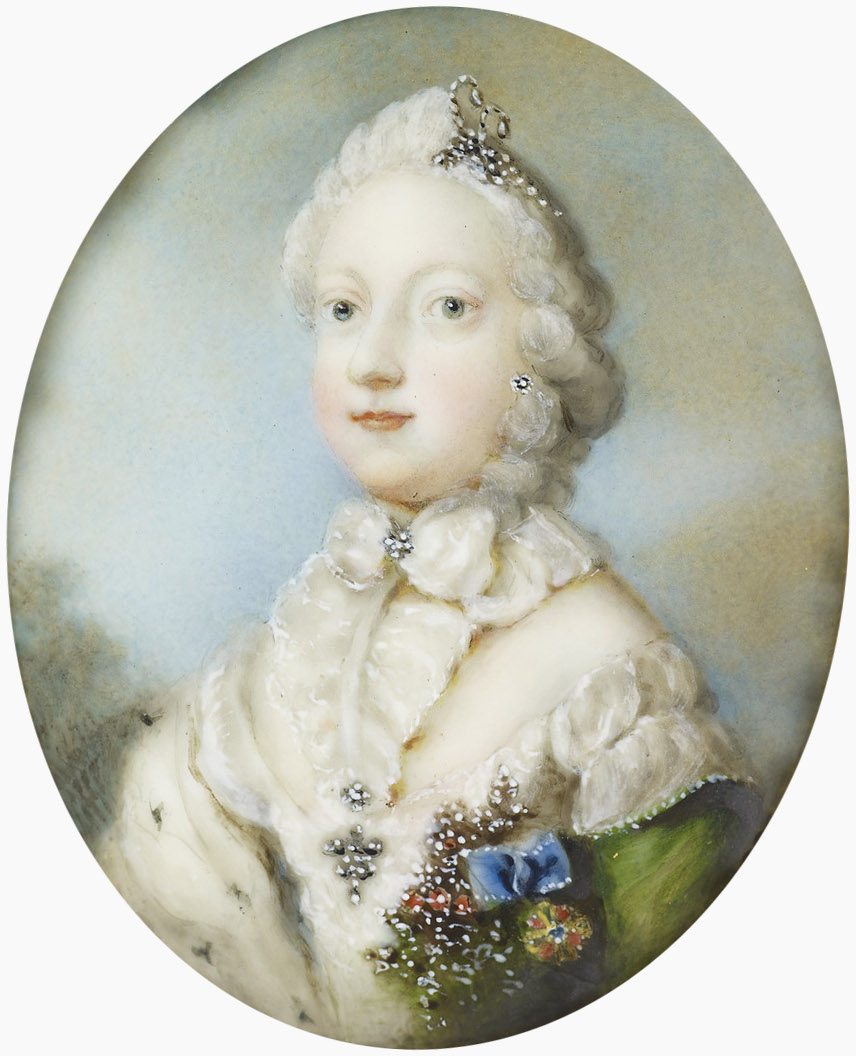
Enamel portrait of Louise as Crown Princess, by William Essex, 1846 (The Royal Collection).

Thus, the marriage negotiations began during the year of 1743, and were successfully concluded within a few months on 14 September. They were married in a proxy wedding ceremony on 10 November 1743 in Hanover, with the Princess's brother, the Duke of Cumberland, acting as the representative of the groom. A week later, the entourages of Louise and Frederick met in the border city of Altona in the then Danish Duchy of Holstein, where Frederick met his wife for the first time. Louise and Frederick then travelled together to Copenhagen, where Louise held her official entry into the Danish capital to great cheers from the population on 11 December 1743. Already the same day a second wedding ceremony with the groom present was held in the chapel of the newly completed Christiansborg Palace.

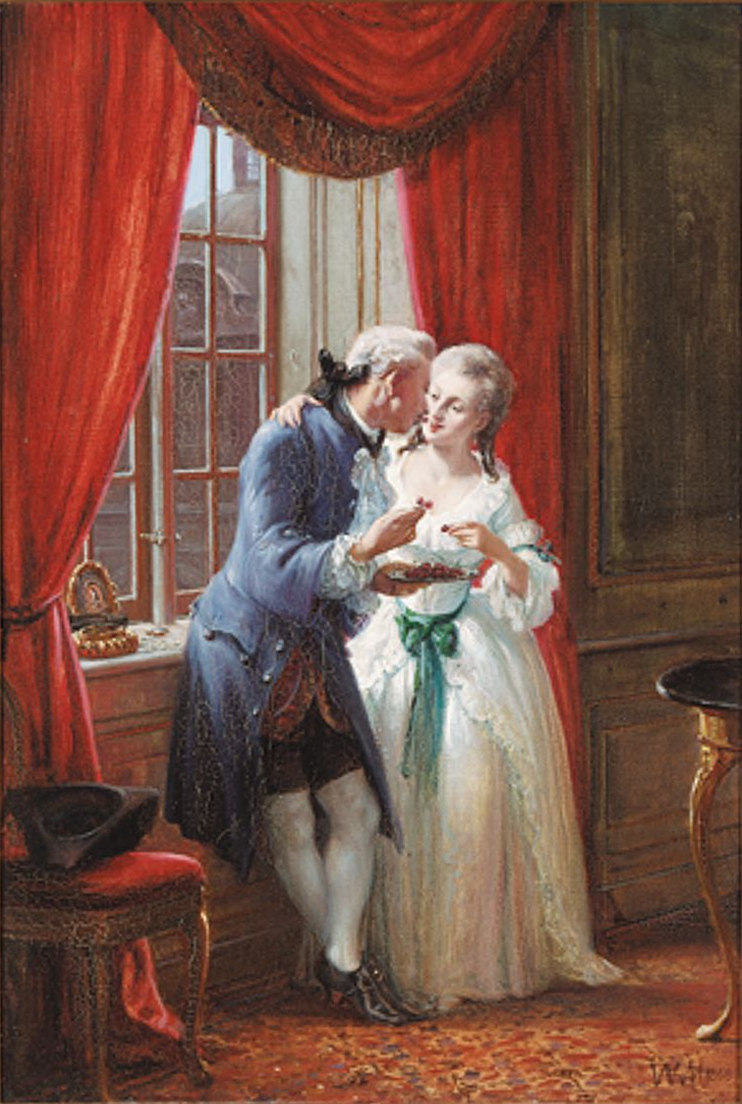
The Crown Prince and Crown Princess sharing cherries in their apartment at Charlottenborg Palace, a scene described by Charlotte Dorothea Biehl. History painting by Wilhelm Marstrand, 1868.

Louise quickly became popular both at the royal court and among the general population, due to her natural and straightforward behavior, and her popularity also contributed to that of her husband. Although the marriage was arranged, the couple got along quite well, and at least during the first years, their relationship was apparently amicable. The couple had five children, of whom the eldest son, the heir to the throne Crown Prince Christian, did not survive infancy. However, Louise only partially succeeded in taming her husband's licentious behavior, and not even in the first period of the marriage did he manage to stay away from the orgies to which he had become accustomed, and continued his debauched lifestyle. Although Frederick came to feel high regard for his wife and always treated her with kindness, he reportedly was not in love with her. He continued to enjoy random liaisons with others, and during the years 1746–51, the king had a favorite mistress named Madam Hansen with whom he also had five children. However, Frederick felt comfortable with Louise, and she pretended not to notice his adultery.

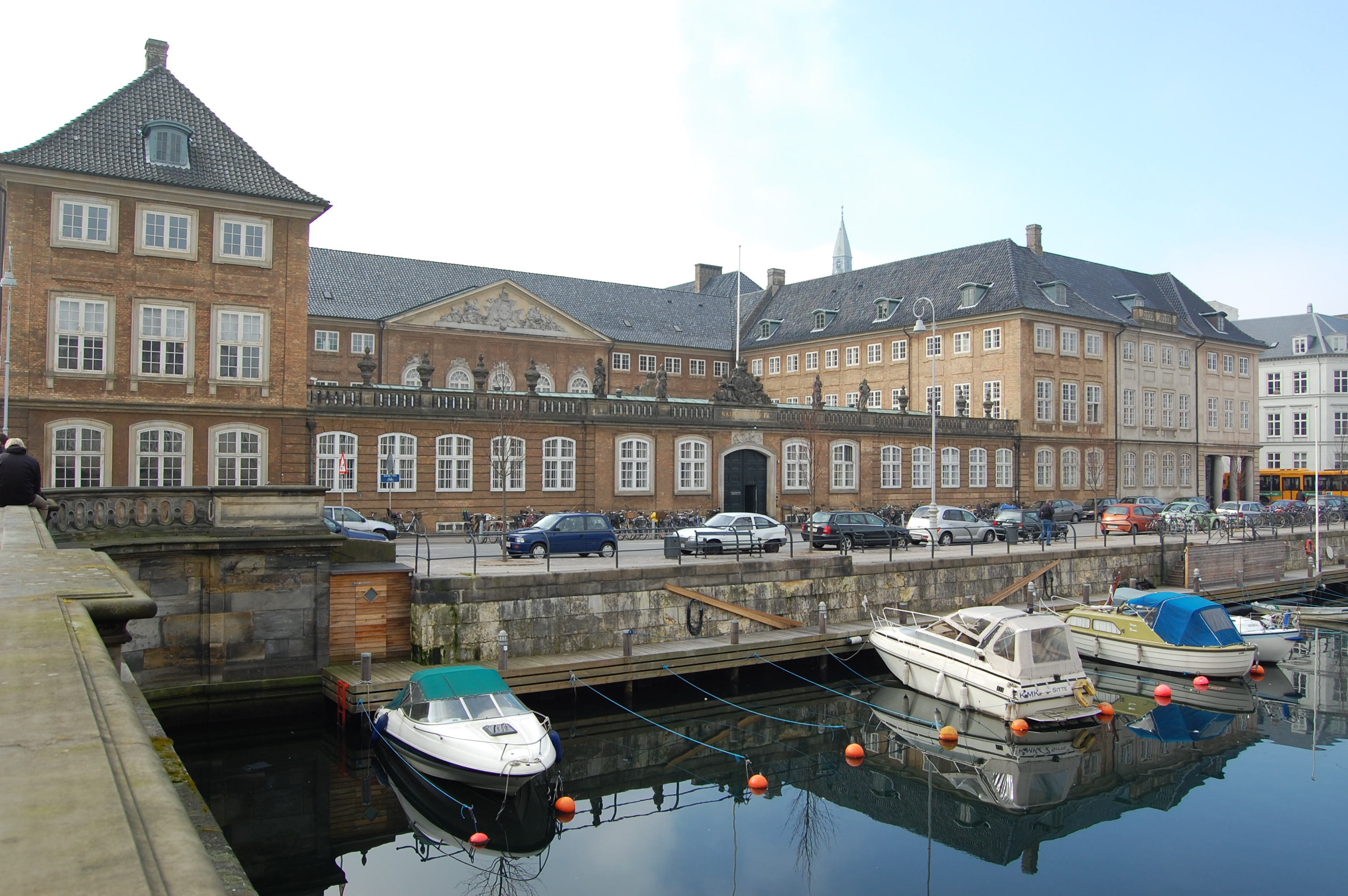
The Prince's Mansion seen from across Frederiksholms Kanal in 2007.

After the wedding, the newlyweds initially took up residence at Charlottenborg Palace (Note: Today, the Charlottenborg Palace serves as the base of the Royal Danish Academy of Fine Arts.), a Baroque style residence of the Danish royal family located at Copenhagen's largest square, Kongens Nytorv. They lived there until, in 1745, they could move into the completed Prince's Mansion (Note: Today, the Prince's Mansion houses the National Museum of Denmark.), a city mansion located just across the Frederiksholm's Canal from Christiansborg Palace, which was remodeled for them by the Danish architect and royal building master Nicolai Eigtved in the new Rococo style. Their home quickly became the setting for a lively and entertaining court which differed greatly from the rigid and heavy etiquette that prevailed at his parents' court at Christiansborg Palace.

=== Freemasonry ===
The Norwegian Masonic historian Karl Ludvig Tørrisen Bugge claimed Frederick V as crown prince was included in the Copenhagen Masonic Lodge St. Martin. This was probably June 1744, and inspired by the Prussian king Frederick the Great who was also included in a masonic lodge in his youth. They both had fathers who were violently opposed to the Masons, but unlike the Prussian king, Frederick V never published his membership of the lodge.

== Reign ==
=== Accession ===
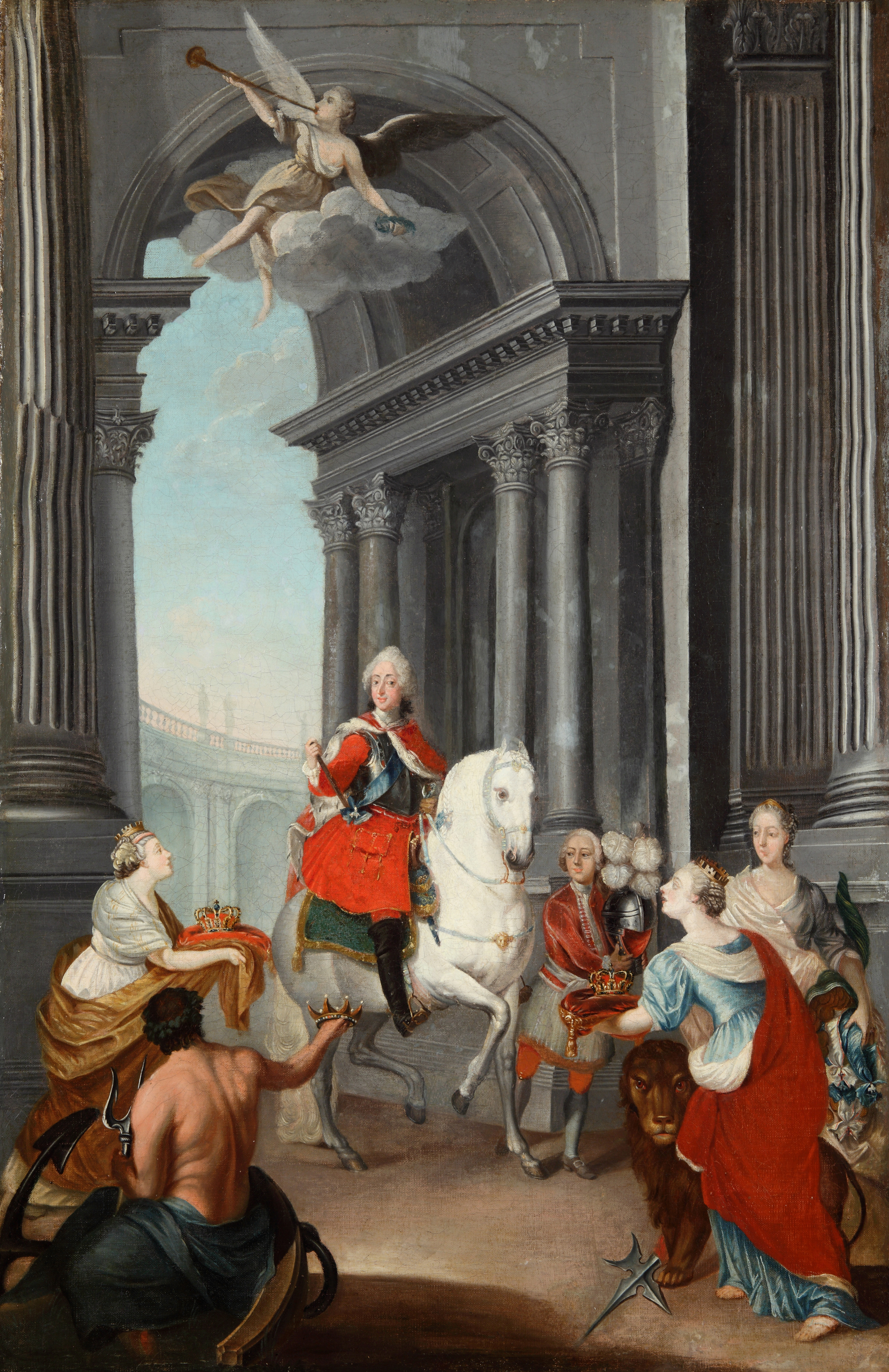
Denmark and Norway paying tribute to King Frederick V. Copy by Johann Friedrich Gerhard of a lost painting by Marcus Tucher, 1747.

On 6 August 1746—the day before his parents' silver marriage festivities—his father died at the age of 46 at Hirschholm Palace, the royal family's summer retreat north of Copenhagen. At the death of his father, Frederick immediately ascended the thrones of Denmark and Norway as their fifth absolute monarch at the age of just 23. The new king and queen then moved the short distance from the Prince's Mansion across the Frederiksholm's Canal into the large Christiansborg Palace. On 4 September the following year, they were anointed in Frederiksborg Palace's Chapel, the traditional place of coronation of Denmark–Norway's monarchs during the days of the absolute monarchy, on the island of Sealand north of Copenhagen.

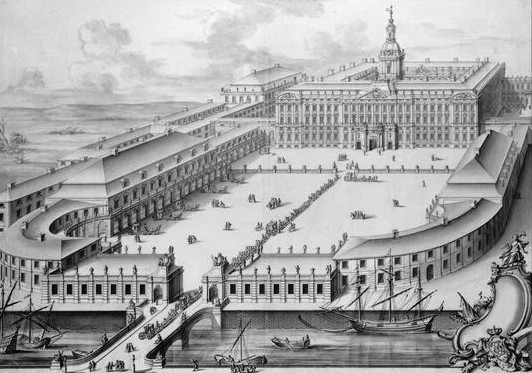
Christiansborg Palace, the royal residence in Copenhagen, c. 1750

Frederick V's accession to the throne brought about a great change in life at the Danish court, which now became far more festive and acquired a more easy-going tone than under his strictly religious parents. What Frederick and Louise on a small scale had begun at Charlottenborg and the Prince's Mansion, they now continued at a large scale at Christiansborg. As secluded as his parents had kept themselves from the people, just as strongly Frederick V seemed to want to meet the people, and it has been told how he and the queen enjoyed socializing with the citizens of Copenhagen and visiting the peasants in their farms. Almost as a sign of the new times, the heavy iron chains that had previously surrounded Christiansborg to keep the people at distance disappeared, court life regained its luster, and the palace's halls and salons once again became the setting for balls and social gatherings. Also commoners were now invited to court events, including the Dano-Norwegian writer Ludvig Holberg, who has described vividly how comfortable he feels at the court of Frederick V.

=== Rule ===
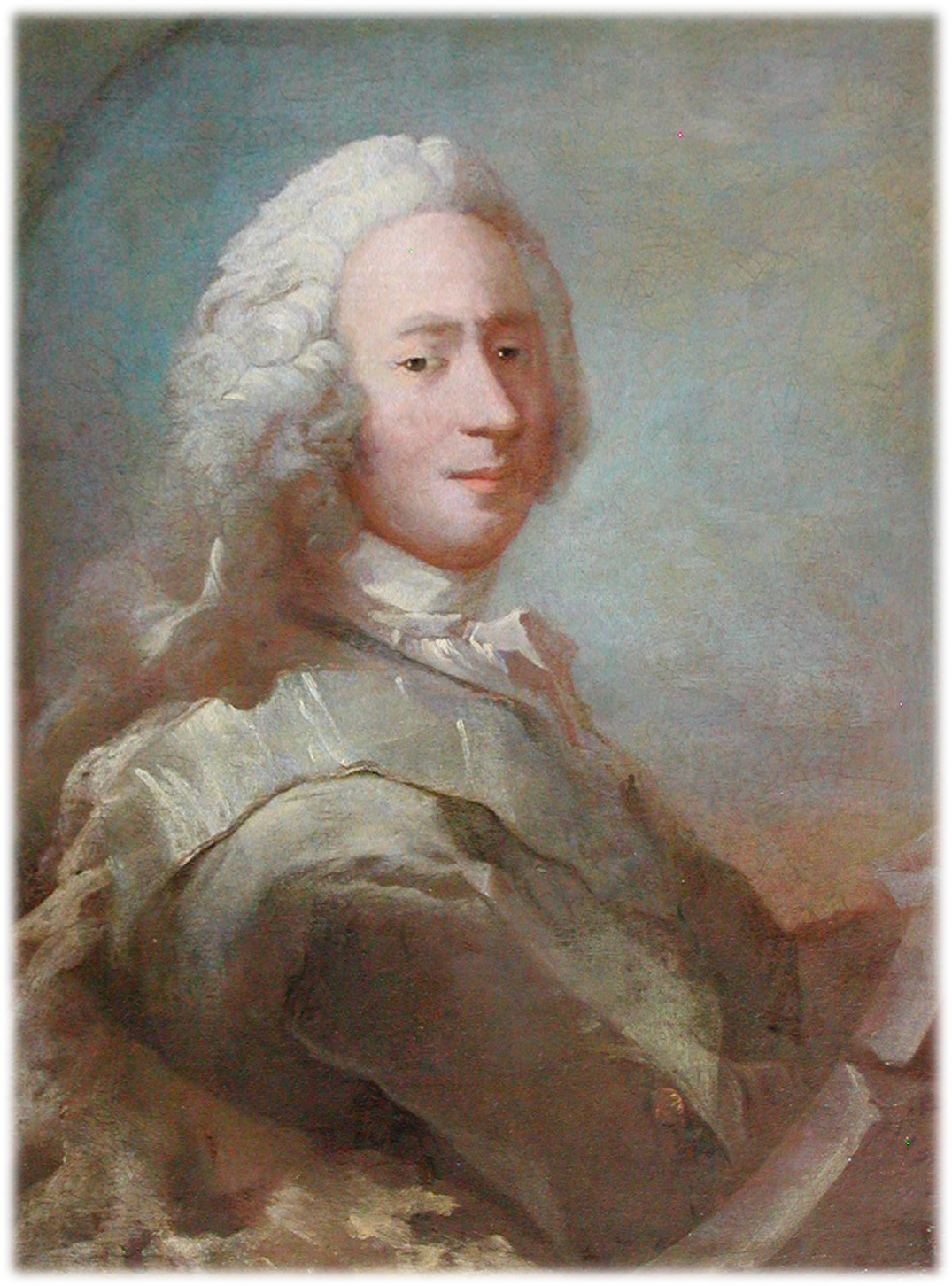
The king's favourite and the de facto ruler of Denmark–Norway during the king's reign, count A. G. Moltke. Portrait by C.G. Pilo.

The personal influence of Frederick was limited, making him one of absolute rulers who least made for the state's strength. When he became king, his alcoholism had developed in such a way that he was hardly able to lead a government alone and was completely dependant on his advisers. Just after his accession he appointed A. G. Moltke, whom he had as a favourite, as his Lord Chamberlain — an office that had previously been a mere court post. Now it became an outstanding position that gave Moltke opportunity as the king's confidential friend to be around him from morning till night, with the king talking to him about whatever was on his mind, which enabled Moltke to make his influence felt in all areas where he pleased. One of his main tasks was to take care that his dissolute Majesty didn't damage the Royal household's reputation with his constant orgies. Frederick's main interest was primarily the arts of war that rivalled the anti-military attitudes that characterized his counsellors; he enjoyed hunting and stayed often at the Jægersborg Dyrehave estates.

Although the king, as regent, took part in the conduct of government by attending council meetings, he was afflicted by alcoholism and most of his rule was dominated by very able ministers such as A. G. Moltke J. H. E. Bernstorff and H. C. Schimmelmann. These men marked his reign by the progress of commerce and the emerging industry of gunpowder plant and cannon foundry in Frederiksværk, built by Johan Frederik Classen. They also avoided involving Denmark–Norway in the European wars of his time. The country remained neutral even for the duration of the Seven Years' War (1756–1763), despite its proximity to combatants Russia and Sweden, an act which undoubtedly shaped the perception of the period as a happy time.

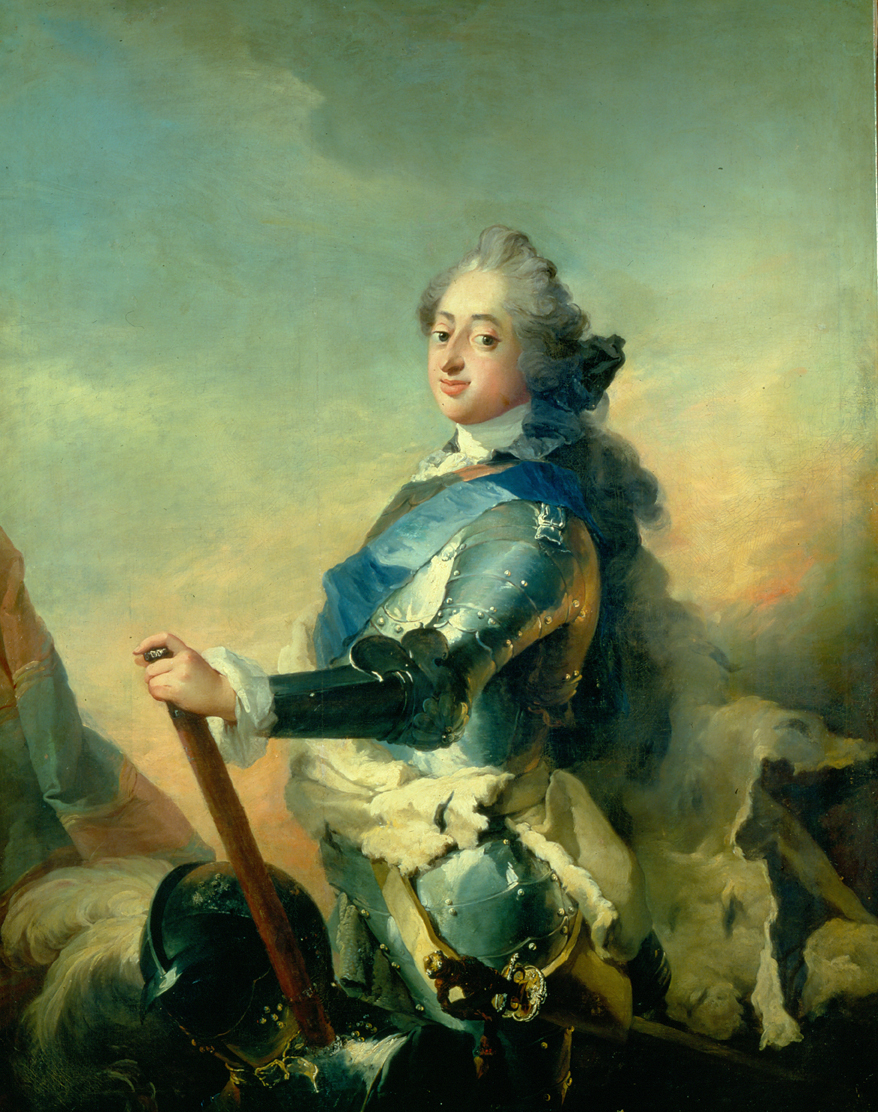
Portrait of Frederick V, by Carl Gustaf Pilo, c. 1751.

In the same period the Royal Frederiks Hospital and the Royal Orphanage (Det kgl. Opfostringshus) was created, a school intended for poor boys that still exists today, opened in Christianshavn on 1 October 1753. On 29 June 1753 Frederick V created Denmark's first lottery, called the Royal Copenhagen Lottery—a lottery that exists to this day as Klasselotteriet.

Art and science prospered under his reign, and although he wasn't personally interested in cultural affairs, the public entertainment, performing arts, and freedom of expression that had been banned under the pietistic hypocrisy (characterized during his father's reign) was again permitted. This change was influenced by his first wife, who encouraged performances by actors and musicians. In 1748, the Royal Danish Theatre (Det Kongelige Teater) opened in Nicolai Eigtved's new Komediehus (Playhouse) on Kongens Nytorv. And in 1754, the Royal Danish Academy of Art (Det Kongelige Danske Kunstakademi) in Copenhagen was also founded under his name and officially inaugurated on 31 March 1754, his 31st birthday. Frederick purchased what would become known as the Danish West Indies from the Danish West India Company in 1754. As an active Freemason, he set up on 24 June 1749 the first Masonic lodge in Norway.

=== Second marriage ===
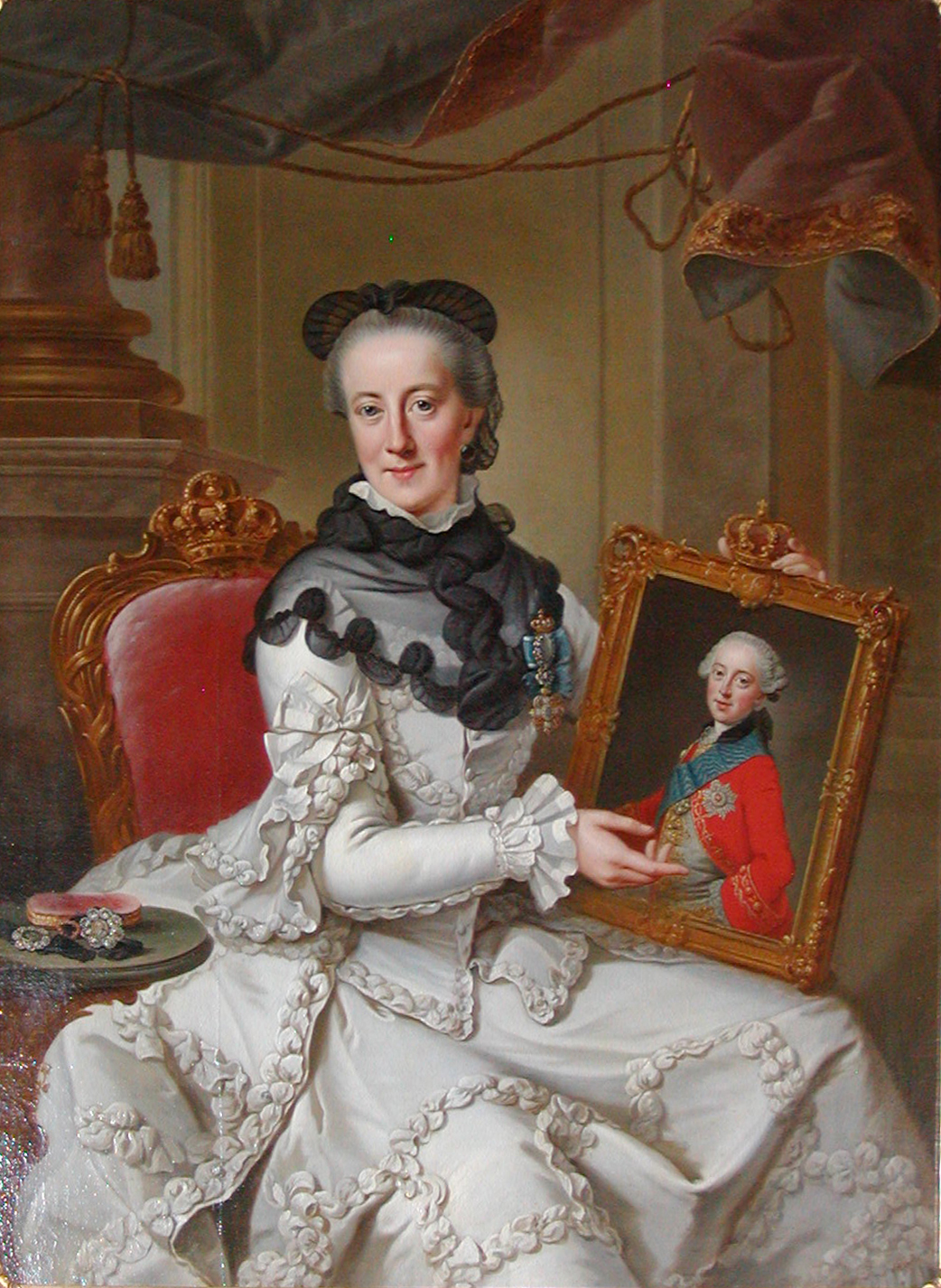
Juliana Maria as Queen dowager showing a portrait of her only son Hereditary Prince Frederick. Painting by Johann Georg Ziesenis, 1766-67.

Queen Louise died suddenly on 19 December 1751 at Christiansborg Palace, predeceasing her husband by fourteen years and causing great impact on the royal family and the court's life, where she was adored. She was buried with great pomp at Roskilde Cathedral. At the time of her death, she was pregnant with her sixth child, who also died.

The government thought it best for the king to remarry as soon as possible, in an attempt to stabilize his behavior. The king himself was initially unwilling to remarry a foreign princess, unless it was with an English princess, none of whom were available at the time. Reportedly, the king had a wish to marry Moltke's own daughter, maid-of-honor Catharine Sophie Wilhelmine von Moltke, a match Adam Gottlob did not wish and prevented by quickly having her married to Count Hannibal Wedell of Wedellsborg. Moltke then drew the king's attention to Duchess Juliana Maria of Brunswick-Wolfenbüttel, daughter of Ferdinand Albert II, Duke of Brunswick-Lüneburg, and sister-in-law to Frederick the Great of Prussia. After having made some additional investigations and met with satisfying answers, the king expressed himself willing to marry her, and the wedding took place at the chapel of Frederiksborg Castle on 8 July 1752. The marriage was frowned upon by the people who saw it as too early for the King to remarry. Neither did the formal princess appeal to his own taste, and with the court she was never popular—with no other identifiable cause than her sense of rigid etiquette, practised in German princely courts, that may have seemed less friendly than the English Louise. During his second marriage, the king had a relationship with Charlotte Amalie Winge.

Their only child, Hereditary Prince Frederick, was born in 1753. He was, in his turn, father of King Christian Frederick of Norway (later King Christian VIII of Denmark) and grandfather of Louise of Hesse, the future queen of Denmark. Juliane Marie died in 1796, having been regent for her son Prince Frederick.

== Death and burial ==
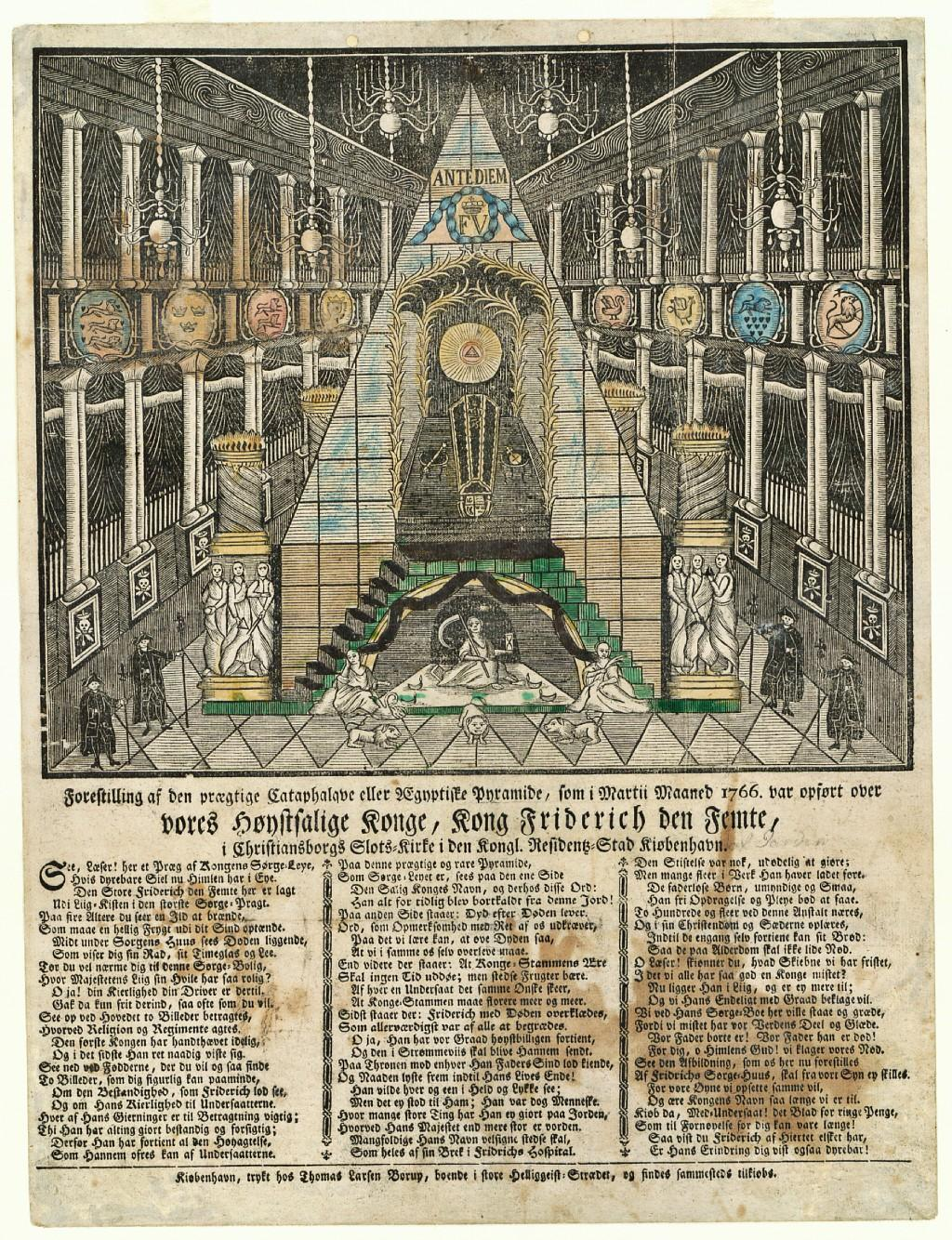
Frederick V's catafalque in Christiansborg Palace Chapel in March 1766.

Over the years, the king's heavy drinking and indulgent lifestyle had taken their toll on his health, especially since his constitution was not too robust to begin with. The king became increasingly melancholic, and neglected himself and the affairs of state. In the last years, his drinking increased even more, and he was rarely sober. Twice he broke his leg in drunken accidents, with subsequent long convalescences which greatly weakened him. According to Dorothea Biehl's statements the king was often seen in a condition "where his arm was not strong enough to bring his hat on his head again without Moltke's help." In the end he was completely broken down as a result of drinking and debauchery. On 14 January 1766 at Christiansborg Palace, the king died of edema at the age of forty-two, after a twenty-year reign. He had been a pleasant change compared to the pious Christian VI's autocracy, and when Frederick died there were many who mourned. His last words were reportedly: "It is a great consolation to me in my last hour that I have never wilfully offended anyone, and that there is not a drop of blood on my hands."

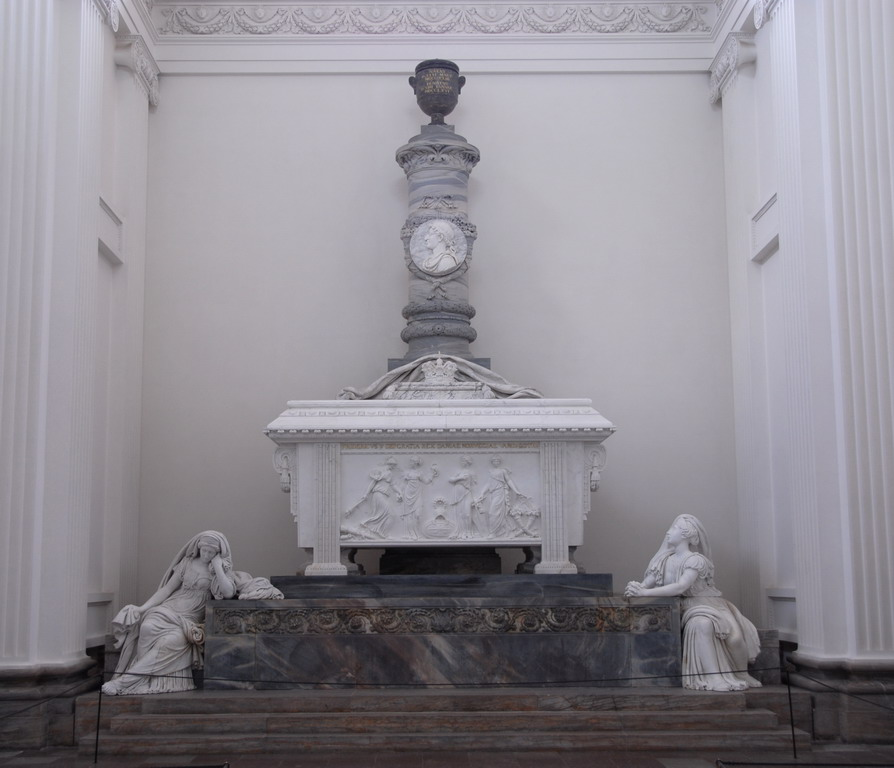
Frederick V's sarcophagus in Roskilde Cathedral, designed by Johannes Wiedewelt.

After lying in state with great pomp at the chapel at Christiansborg Palace in Copenhagen, he was interred next to Queen Louise in Roskilde Cathedral on the island of Zealand, the traditional burial site for Danish monarchs since the 15th century. His monument in Roskilde cathedral was completed in 1769, and designed by the Danish sculptor Johannes Wiedewelt. It includes a large sarcophagus resting on footpieces and decorated by numerous sculptures, behind which is a column topped of an urn, a medallion with the king's portrait, and on each side of the sarcophagus, sitting approx. 9' high above the floor, are two crowned, grieving female figures representing Denmark and Norway. The memorial chapel in which it is placed was created as a collaboration between Wiedewelt and the Danish architect Caspar Frederik Harsdorff.

== Legacy ==
=== Monuments ===
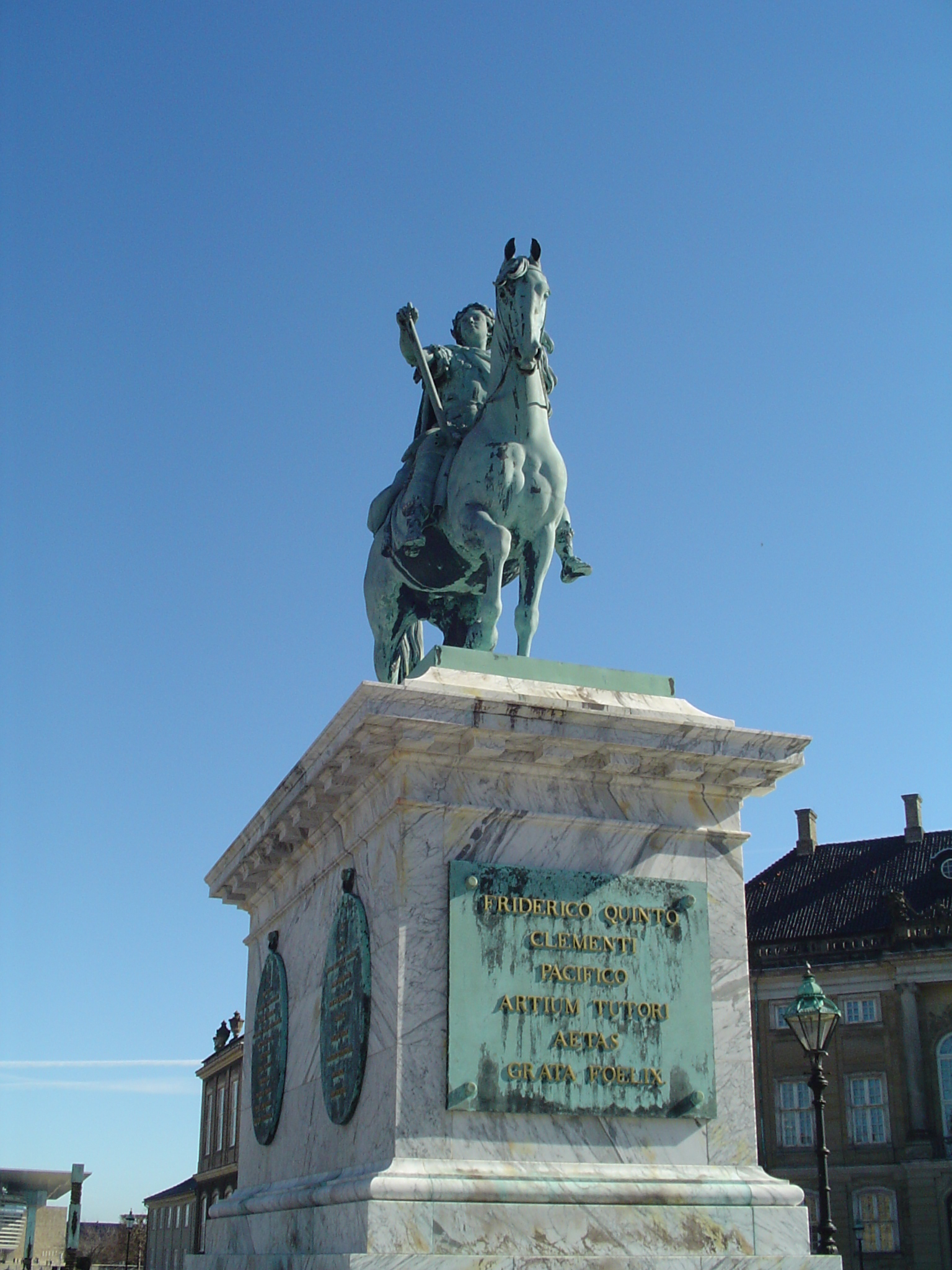
Statue of Frederick V on horseback by Jacques Saly at the centre of the Amalienborg Palace Square. It was commissioned by Moltke, as Director of the Danish Asiatic Company.

On 1 August 1771, five years after the king's death, an equestrian statue of Frederick V dressed in the garb of a Roman emperor by the French sculptor Jacques François Joseph Saly was unveiled in Amalienborg Square in Copenhagen.

=== Places named after Frederick V ===
- The town of Frederiksværk on the island of Zealand, Denmark
- The town of Frederiksted on the island of St. Croix, U.S. Virgin Islands
- The district Frederiksstaden in central Copenhagen, Denmark
- The city of Serampore in the Indian state of West Bengal was known under the name Frederiksnagore from 1755 to 1845 when it was part of Danish India
- The city of Paamiut in Greenland was formerly known as Frederikshaab
- The former naval base Fredriksvern in Norway

=== Succession crisis ===
Within one hundred years of his time, Denmark faced the crisis of his male issue (the main branch of the Royal House) becoming extinct. This created a succession crisis beginning from his grandson's reign that affected both Denmark and Schleswig-Holstein. Finally, his great-grandson through the female line, Christian IX, who was married to his great-granddaughter Louise of Hesse-Kassel (or Hesse-Cassel), became the designated heir.

=== 2021 bust controversy ===
In February 2021, Frederick V came suddenly to the focus of a historical-political controversy when a group of radical artists removed a bust of the King and sank it in Copenhagen Harbor, in protest of Denmark's role in the Atlantic slave trade during his reign.

== Cultural depictions ==
=== Literature ===
Frederick V appears in the early part of The Visit of the Royal Physician (Swedish: Livläkarens besök), a 1999 historical novel by Per Olov Enquist, which mainly deals with his son Christian VII. As depicted in the book, Frederick's contemptuous and overbearing attitude to his son had a significant part in causing the mental instability which characterized Christian's life and reign.

== Issue ==
Name	Birth	Death	Notes
Crown Prince Christian	Copenhagen, 7 July 1745	Frederiksborg, 3 June 1747	died in infancy
Princess Sophia Magdalena	3 July 1746	21 August 1813	married, 1766, Gustav III, King of Sweden; had issue
Princess Wilhelmina Caroline	10 July 1747	19 January 1820	married, 1763, William I, Elector of Hesse; had issue
King Christian VII	29 January 1749	13 March 1808	married, 1766, Princess Caroline Matilda; had issue
Princess Louise	30 January 1750	12 January 1831	married, 1766, Prince Charles of Hesse-Kassel; had issue
Hereditary Prince Frederick	11 October 1753	7 December 1805	married, 1774, Duchess Sophia Frederica of Mecklenburg-Schwerin; had issue

His officially recognized children by Else Hansen:

- Frederikke Margarethe de Hansen, Countess of Destinon (1747–1802)
- Frederikke Catherine de Hansen, Countess of Lützau (1748–1822)
- Anna Marie de Hansen, Mrs. Fehmann, later Mrs van Meulengacht (1749–1812)
- Sophie Charlotte de Hansen, Countess d'Origny (1750–1779)
- Ulrik Frederik de Hansen (1751–1752)

== Ancestry ==
Ancestors of Frederick V of Denmark

8. Christian V of Denmark
4. Frederick IV of Denmark
9. Princess Charlotte Amalie of Hesse-Kassel
2. Christian VI of Denmark
10. Gustav Adolf, Duke of Mecklenburg-Güstrow
5. Duchess Louise of Mecklenburg-Güstrow
11. Duchess Magdalena Sibylla of Holstein-Gottorp
1. Frederick V of Denmark
12. Georg Albrecht, Margrave of Brandenburg-Kulmbach
6. Christian Heinrich, Margrave of Brandenburg-Kulmbach
13. Princess Maria Elisabeth of Schleswig-Holstein-Sonderburg-Glücksburg
3. Princess Sophie Magdalene of Brandenburg-Kulmbach
14. Count Albrecht Friedrich of Wolfstein
7. Countess Sophie Christiane of Wolfstein
15. Countess Sophie Luise of Castell-Remlingen

== See also ==
- History of Denmark
- History of Norway

== Notes ==
Frederick V House of Oldenburg Born: 31 March 1723 Died: 13 January 1766
Regnal titles
Preceded by Christian VI	King of Denmark and Norway; Duke of Schleswig; Count of Oldenburg; 1746–1766	Succeeded by Christian VII
Preceded by Christian VI and Charles Peter Ulrich	Duke of Holstein; 1746–1766 with Charles Peter Ulrich (1746–1762); Paul (1762–1766)	Succeeded by Christian VII and Paul
