= Else Hansen =

Royal mistress (1720–1784)

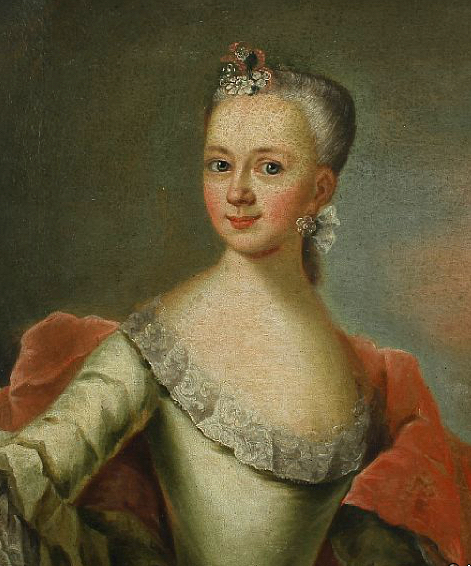
Painting of Madam Hansen by Jens Thrane

Else Hansen (Cathrine Marie Mahs Hansen) also called de Hansen (1720 – 4 September 1784), was the royal mistress of king Frederick V of Denmark. She was his most famous mistress and known in history as Madam Hansen, and was, alongside Charlotte Amalie Winge, one of only two women known to have been long term lovers of the king.

== Life ==
The background of Else Hansen is not known. Tradition has claimed her to be the sister of Frederick's chamber servant Henrik Vilhelm Tillisch, who in 1743 reportedly smuggled in his sister to the king at night, but modern research does not support them being one and the same person.

=== Royal mistress ===
It is not known exactly when and how Hansen became the lover of the king. Frederick V was known for his debauched life style. According to Dorothea Biehl, the king was known to participate in orgies or 'Bacchus parties', in which he drank alcohol with his male friends while watching female prostitutes who stripped naked and danced, after which the king would sometime beat them with his stick and whip them after having been intoxicated by alcohol. These women were financially compensated, but none of them seem to have had the status of a long term mistress, and nor did any of the noblewomen and maids-of-honor, who according to rumours where offered to the king by their families in hope of advantage but were simply married off to other men as soon as they became pregnant. The relationship between the king and Else Hansen was therefore uncommon.

Else Hansen gave birth to five children with the king between 1746 and 1751, which is why the affair is presumed to have started in 1746 at the latest and ended in 1751 at the earliest. Her three younger children at least were all born at the Ulriksholm manor on Funen, owned by Ulrik Frederik von Heinen, brother-in-law of the king's favourite Adam Gottlob Moltke, who probably arranged the matter. The manor was named after the royal Ulrik Christian Gyldenlove, illegitimate son of a previous king. The king's children with Hansen were baptised in the local parish church near the manor, where they were officially listed as the legitimate children of the wife of a non-existent man called "Frederick Hansen, shipwright from Gothenburg to China". The frequent trips to Ulriksholm by Hansen as soon as her pregnancies with the king became evident were publicly noted. Neither Else Hansen nor any other of the king's mistresses were ever introduced at the royal court, nor did they have any influence upon state affairs, as politics were entrusted by the king to his favourite Moltke.

In 1752, the relationship between the king and Hansen may have ended – in any case, it was not mentioned more or nor were there any more children. Hansen settled in the Kejrup property near Ulriksholm with her children, officially with the status of "widow of the late sea captain de Hansen".

=== Later life ===
After the death of Frederick in 1766, she acquired the Klarskov estate on Funen. She sold Klarskov and moved to Odense in 1768. In 1771, however, she bought Klarskov a second time and continued to live there until her death.

Her children were not officially recognised, but unofficially they were taken care of by the royal court: her daughters were given a dowry and married to royal officials and the son's careers were protected. Her grandchildren were also provided with an allowance from the royal house.

After Hansen, the king did not have any long term mistress until Charlotte Amalie Winge (1762–66).

== Legacy ==
At Frederiksborgmuseet, there are three paintings of Hansen by Jens Thrane the Younger from 1764. Hansen is known from Dorothea Biehl's depiction of the decadent court life of Frederick V.

== Issue ==
Her children were officially listed with the father "Frederick Hansen, sea captain":

- Frederikke Margarethe de Hansen (1747–1802)
- Frederikke Catherine de Hansen (1748–1822)
- Anna Marie de Hansen (1749–1812)
- Sophie Charlotte de Hansen (1750–1779)
- Ulrik Frederik de Hansen (1751–1752)

== Sources ==
- Charlotte Dorothea Biehl, Interiører fra Frederik V's Hof, udgivet af Louis Bobé.
- Aage Christens, Slægten de Hansen, 1968.
