= Charlotte Amalie Winge =

Royal mistress of King Frederick V of Denmark

Charlotte Amalie Winge (floruit 1766) was the royal mistress of King Frederick V of Denmark. She is known as Madam Winge and was, alongside Else Hansen, one of only two women known to have been long term lovers of the king.

== Biography ==
Charlotte Amalie Winge was the widow of a priest when she became the lover of the king in 1762 during the time of his marriage to Queen Juliana Maria of Brunswick-Wolfenbüttel. According to a traditional story, the king met Winge dressed as an Amazon on a walk at Bregentved manor, where he was staying with Lord Chamberlain Adam Gottlob Moltke. King Frederick brought her back to Copenhagen as his mistress, installing her in a house at Vandkunsten. If so, Moltke was likely the one arranging the meeting.

Winge is not believed by author and playwright Dorothea Biehl (1731-1788) to have participated in the famously decadent Bacchus parties (Bacchusfesterne) of the king, but rather was seen as someone who could ease the king's mind and nurse him during his decreasingly ill health. It is noted that during the king's illness, Queen Juliane Maria often found Winge nursing the king when she came to tend to his health.

Just as with the rest of Frederick's lovers, Winge was not an official mistress introduced at court, nor did she have any influence on state affairs. However, in contrast to most other lovers of the king, Winge managed to make him hand out favors to her relatives, and he gave her sister a pension, made her brother-in-law an official, and protected her two nephews in their careers as officers.

The relationship between the king and Winge lasted until the king's death in 1766. After the death of the king, Charlotte Amalie Winge was granted a pension as long as she stayed unmarried.
