= Materna (disambiguation) =

Materna is the original title of the music to the song "America the Beautiful".

Materna may also refer to:

- Eudocima materna, a moth of the family Noctuidae
- Materna coat of arms from the Polish-Lithuanian Commonwealth
- Materna (film), a 2020 American drama film
- Amalie Materna (1844–1918), Austrian operatic soprano
- Anna Catharina Materna (1731–1757), Danish actress and playwright
- Friedrich Materna (1885–1946), German general
- Jerzy Materna (born 1956), Polish politician
