= Carl August Thielo =

Danish composer and musician

Carl August Thielo (February 7, 1707 – December 3, 1763) was a Danish composer. theatre entrepreneur, music teacher, organist from the Electorate of Saxony. He spent most of his life in Copenhagen from the 1720s onwards and founded the first opera house there in 1746. A student of Johann Gottfried Walther, he was the author of a Danish treatise, Tanker og Regler fra Grunden af om Musiken, published in 1746. Thielo was also the German court organist under Christian VI. He was the father of Caroline Thielo.

== Partial works ==
- (1744) Der andere Zuschauer in Fabeln geschrieben und herausgegeben in Copenhagen
- (1746) Tanker og Regler Fra Grunden af om Musiken, For dem som vil lære Musiken til Sindets Fornøyelse Saa og for dem Som vil gjøre Fait af Claveer, General-Bassen, og Synge-Kunsten
- (1747) Spøgelset med klokken : een nach-comœdie i een act for den danske skue-plads
- (1747) Fruentimmer huusholdning : forrestillet udi en comoedie af tre acter, for den danske skue-plads
- (1751) Første Samling af de Oder, som paa den Danske Skueplads udi Kiøbenhavn ere blevne opførte
- (1753) Grund-regeln wie man, beÿ weniger information, sich selbst die fundamenta der music und des claviers, lernen kan, beschrieben, mit exempeln in noten gezeiget und verlegt von C. A. T. Erster theil
- (1757) Charlotte eller forunderlige Tildragelser med Frøken von Weisensøe
- (1759) Nogle korte Satyriske og Moralske Original-Syngespil
- (1759) Den borgerlige Hovmesterinde eller en Samling af moralske, critiske og oeconomiske Tanker for Fruentimmerne : [1]-3. Deel
- (1760) Den Grønne April
- (1761) Fierde Deel af de Musicaliske Comødie-Stykker, som ere opførte paa den Kongelige Danske Skueplads i Kiøbenhavn
- (1761) Vilhelmine eller den rige kone i America
- (1762) Den angenemme May-Maaned

== See also ==
- List of Danish composers
