= Caroline Thielo =

Danish actress

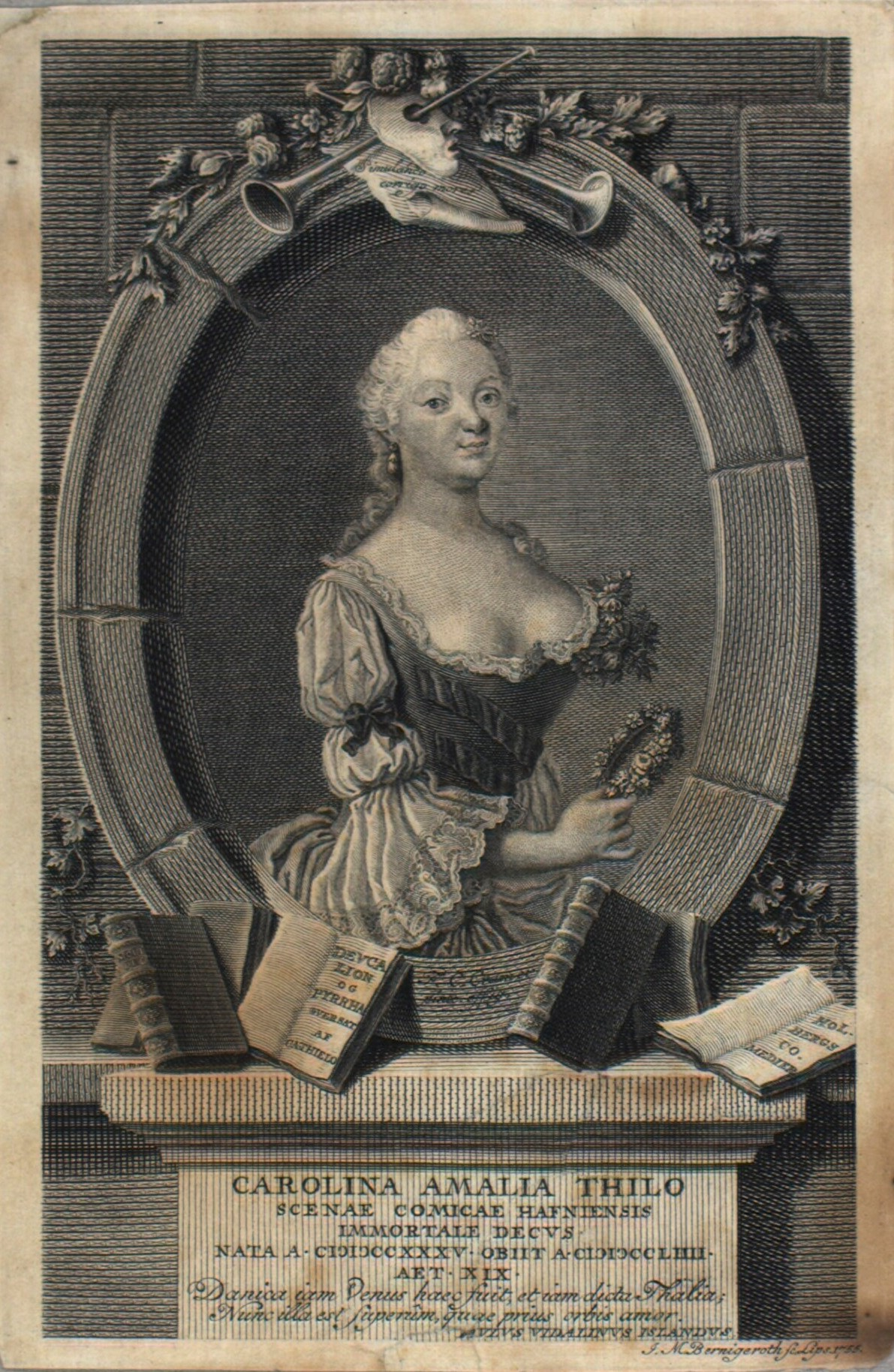
- Portrait of Caroline Thielo by Johann Martin Bernigeroth, 1755
- Born: Caroline Amalie Thielo; 1 March 1735; Denmark
- Died: 5 February 1754 (aged 18); Denmark
- Occupation: Actress
- Years active: 1747–1754
- Father: Carl August Thielo

Caroline Amalie Thielo (1 March 1735 – 5 February 1754) was a Danish actress, one of her country's first professional native female actors, and said to be the first actress ever employed at the Royal Danish Theatre in Copenhagen. She was very popular in the mid-18th century, and was also employed as a translator of plays for the theatre.

== Life and career ==
Born child of the organist Carl August Thielo (1707–1763, the founder and first director of the Royal Danish Theatre), she debuted at the age of twelve on the temporary stage at Læderstræde, where her father's troupe had performed since 1747 after public theatre was once more made legal in Denmark, and until the building of the Royal Theatre was finished in 1748.

Thielo was considered to be the leading interpreter of mistress, heroine and girl's parts, and became very popular. Among her roles was Agnès in Fruentimmerskolen by Molière, and Isabella in Don Ranudo by Ludvig Holberg. Amongst the plays she translated for the theatre were Deucalion, and Pyrrha, which was performed in 1753. As with many actresses of this age, she was considered to be a prostitute; this was a common view in this period, as it was considered indecent of women to expose themselves in public, and Caroline Thielo, being young, beautiful and unmarried, was particularly exposed to this – the novelty of female actors drew people to the theatre; it was said that many people came there just to see the women on the stage, who were considered very exotic.

== Death ==
According to legend that the Danish theatrical historian Thomas Overskou mentions in his work on the Danish theater, Thielo was murdered when she was only 19 years old. She is said to have had an affair with the Russian emissary in Copenhagen Baron Johann Albrecht von Korff, who belonged to the freemasons; she had tricked him into revealing some secret signs, and as a consequence, he murdered her by having his servant blood let her to death. However this story is pure fabrication, and does not seem to have had any adherents until Overskou mentioned it in 1856. Other sources claim that, in reality, she died of the fever.
