= Anna Catharina Materna =

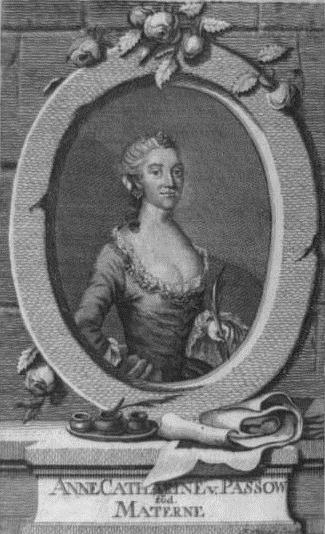
Anna Catharina Materna

Anna Catharina Materna (née von der Lühe) (1731–1757) was a Danish actress and playwright. She belonged to the first pioneer-troupe of actors at the Royal Danish Theatre, and later became one of the first female playwrights to have her plays performed there.

== Life and career ==
Materna was the child of the noble but poor Lieutenant Friedrich Siegfried Johann Hans von der Lühe (1705–50) and Mechtilde Siegfriede Jullern (d. 1763), and joined the theatre in 1748 when it advertised for female actors, who were in short supply for the newly opened national stage in Copenhagen. It was unusual, and considered very shameful, for a member of the nobility to perform on stage, and she took the stage name Materna to hide her identity.

Anna Catharina Materna was not in reality considered to have much talent as an actor, but she knew how to portray a noblewoman, and was considered perfect for this on the stage, and she became a primadonna of the theatre in such parts, used much as a stage-ornament, and sometimes considered the first to interpret the soubrette role on the Danish stage. She was also the subject of many rumors and intrigues among her colleagues, especially from her great rival Anna Dorothea Lund. She was also regarded and talked about as a courtesan, and had a long list of lovers; in 1753, she was offered an allowance to become a kept woman, negotiations being handled by her mother, and in the same year, she retired from the stage. In her farewell letter to Ludvig Holberg, which she sent to him when she left the theatre, she said that her colleagues had never let a moment pass which they did not take to embarrass her; she also wrote about them; "I Know I have been more of a burden for them than an asset", but she also thanked Holberg "For the kindness always directed towards me", and tells him, that: "I have you to thank for a great deal of my happiness, a memory which will always remain with me." The same year, Holberg wrote a code of behaviour for the theatre and lectured those who mistreated their colleagues.

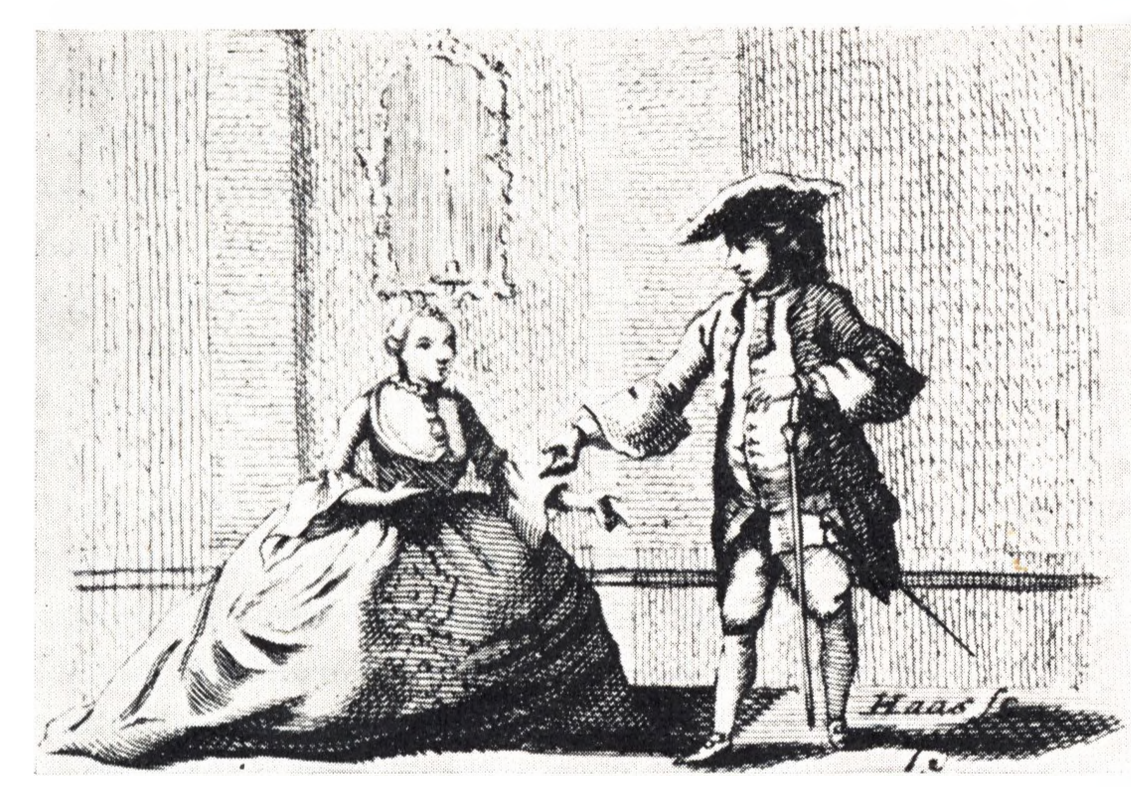
Illustration from the title leaf of Mariane eller Det frie Valg. 1757.

In that year, she married the nobleman Christian Albrecht von Passow (1732–1777) (but keeping the surname Materna), a marriage that produced a child, which was kept a secret. von Passow then left Denmark for Tranquebar in India, and, although Materna was meant to follow him, this did not happen. Instead, she began a new career as a translator and writer of plays. She became one of the first writers in Europe to use the old Nordic gods of her own country, rather than the Roman gods and goddesses, in her plays; she stated that she did not see the reason to use Roman or Greek gods, when Denmark had so many of their own. Three of her plays were performed on the stage at the Royal Danish Theatre; she was one of the first native female writers to have her plays performed there.
