= Dorothea Biehl =

Danish writer and translator (1731–1788)

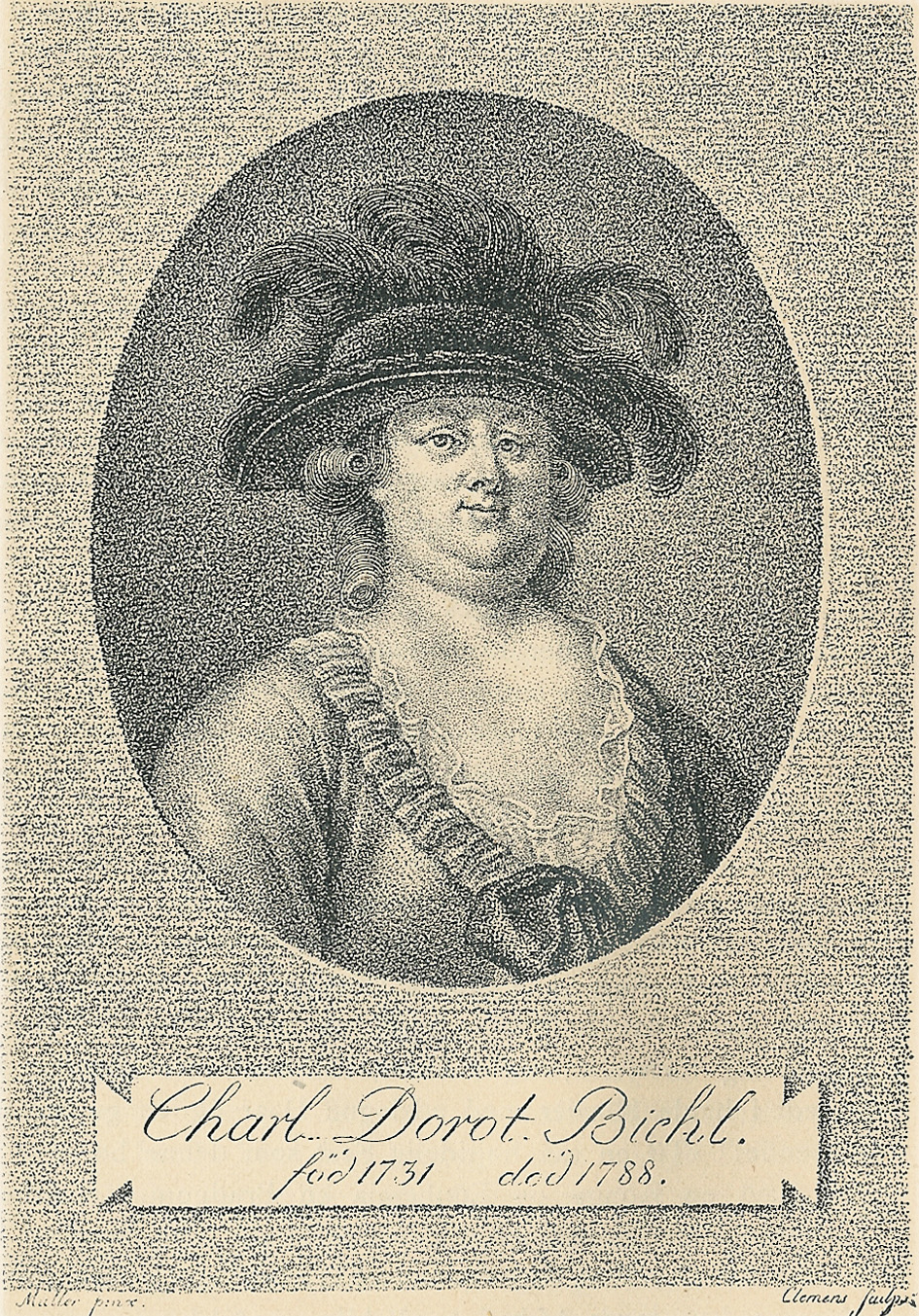
Dorothea Biehl

Charlotte Dorothea Biehl (June 2, 1731 – May 17, 1788) was a Danish writer, playwright, letter writer and translator.

== Biography ==
Charlotta Dorothea Biehl was born in Copenhagen, Denmark. Her parents were Christian Æmilius Biehl and Sophie Hedevig Brøer. At an early age, she learned to read and write in both the Danish and German languages from her maternal grandfather, Hans Brøer, who died when she was eight years old. After his death, her parents forbade her to read, and when her grandmother also died in 1746, she had to become a maid in 1747. In 1755, her father became a secretary at the Royal Danish Academy of Fine Arts.

In 1761, Biehl started to translate plays from French in particular, but also from German and Italian for the Royal Danish Theatre. In 1762, her own play, Poète Campagnard, had its first performance, and she continued as a playwright until 1783. She wrote 13 comedies and was the first author in Denmark to give children parts and lines in her plays. Her greatest success was Den kierlige Mand (1764). Her play Den listige Optrækkerske (1765), about a woman using men's sexuality as a mean of self confirmation, became a scandal.

In 1771, she met Johan Bülow, whose position at the royal count inspired Biehl's historical letters about the Danish kings Frederik V, Christian VI, Frederik VI and Christian VII. Her correspondence with Johan Bülow, Brevveksling imellem fortrolige venner, was published in 1783.

She also translated the Quixote into Danish (Den sindriige Adelsmand Don Quixote af Manchas Levnet og Bedrifter, 1776-77).

Biel has been referred to as the greatest Danish letter writer of the 18th century. In 1787, she also wrote her autobiography in the form of one long letter.

== Selected works ==
- Poète Campagnard (1762)
- Den kierlige mand (1764)
- Den forelskede ven (1765)
- Den listige optrækkerske (1765)
- Den prøvede Troskab (1774)
- Kierligheds-Brevene (1774)
- Den listige Optrækkerske (1765)
- Brevveksling imellem fortrolige venner 1-3, (1783)
- Orpheus og Eurydice (1786)
- Mit ubetydelige Levnets Løb (1787)

== See also ==
- Anna Catharina Materna

== Related reading ==
- Katharina M. Wilson (1991) An Encyclopedia of Continental Women Writers, Volume 1 (Taylor & Francis) ISBN 9780824085476
