= Anne Dorthe Lund =

Danish actor

Anna Dorothea Lund (died 29 October 1759) was a Danish stage actress. She belonged to the pioneer generation of actors at the Royal Danish Theatre, and was one of the leading members there for a decade after its foundation.

The background and parentage of Anna Dorothea Lund is unknown, other than the fact that her original name was Holst. She married the tobacco trader Asser Mortensen Lund (d. 1760) in 1749, but evidently separated from him.

In 1747, the belonged to the pioneer group of actors who started to perform theater plays in Copenhagen when the theater ban - introduced during the reign of Christian VI - was lifted, and in 1748, she followed the actors when a permanent theater building was provided them in the foundation of the Royal Danish Theatre. She is listed as one of the highest paid members of the staff. As a person, she was described as an intriguer who was reprimanded by Holberg for trying to discredit her colleague Madame Rosenkilde for being a courtesan while she was in fact rumored to be one herself.

Lund primarily performed soubrette roles, and has been referred to as "one of the greatest soubrettes, the Danish stage has ever owned".
