= Rulers of Hohenlohe =

The following is a list of rulers of Hohenlohe. The territory was, since the medieval period, ruled by one single family: the House of Hohenlohe.

== History ==
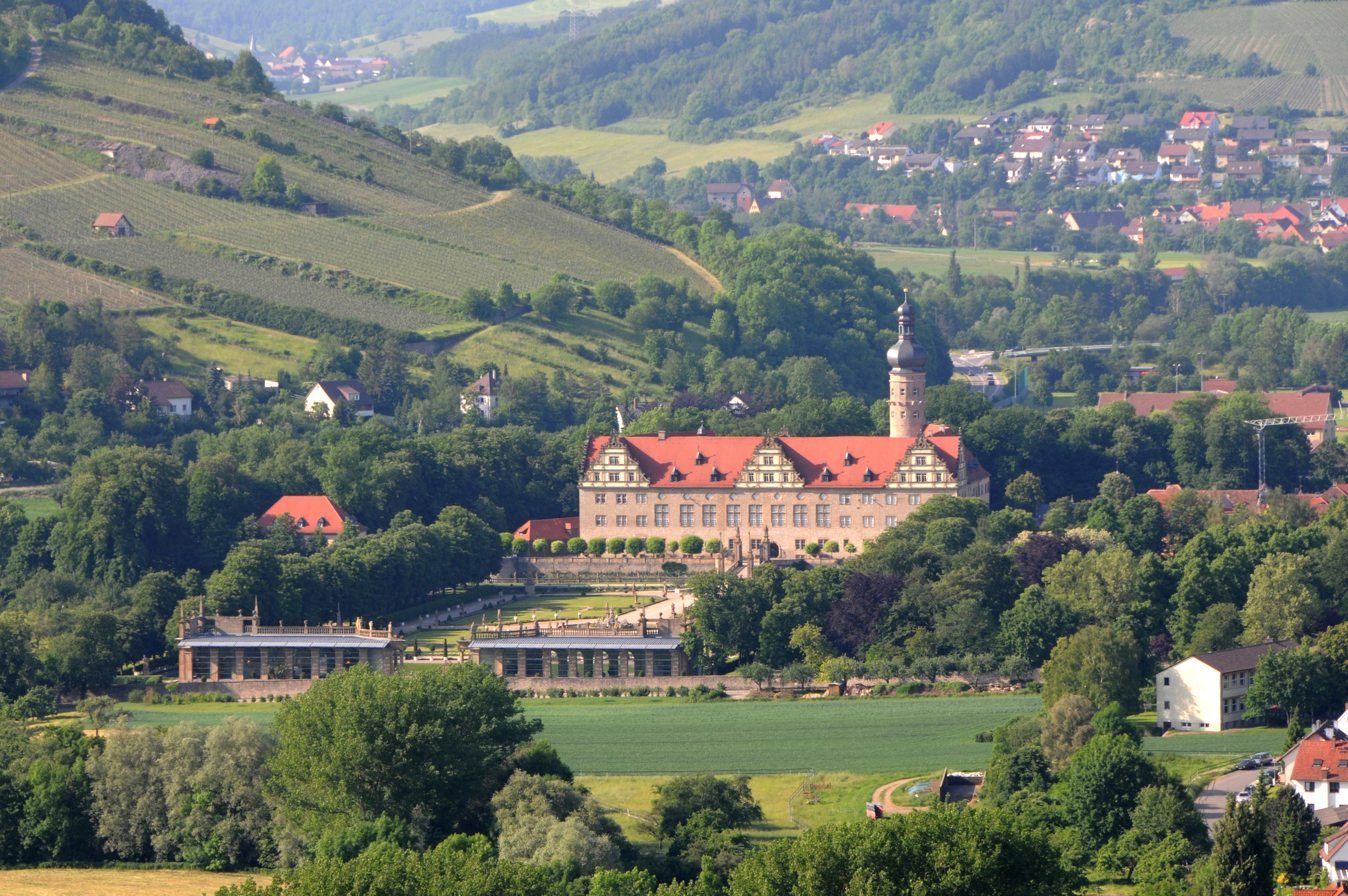
Castle of Weikersheim.

The first known member of the family mentioned in the territory was Conrad, Lord of Weikersheim. This town was, then, where the family had the right of escorting travellers and goods and charging customs (Geleitrecht), along the Tauber river on the trading route between Frankfurt and Augsburg until the 14th century. The sources of the Imperial Abbey of Lorch led Hansmartin Decker-Hauff to question if there was a close relationship between the Hohenlohe family and the House of Hohenstaufen, but, according to historian Klaus Graf, the link cannot be proved. That didn't top the family, however, of later boasting this possible kinship with the Imperial family.

The name of the family, Hohenlohe was first mentioned in 1178, honouring the Hohlach Castle, near Simmershofen in Middle Franconia. The name was also adopted for the land the family ruled, because, while Weikersheim was a fiefdom of the Comburg monastery, Hohlach was then more valuable, as it was an imperial fiefdom, and as so, its owners were granted the status of imperial knight. Despite Hohlach having its advantages, such as securing the Rothenburg−Ochsenfurt road, it soon lost its importance, as the family's property was expanding directly from their ancestral town of Weikersheim. However, the lands, castles and estates the family held as a whole borrowed the name from the imperial fiefdom, Hohenlohe.

== Mediatization ==
On 12 July 1806, the principalities became parts of the kingdoms of Bavaria and of Württemberg by the Act of the Confederation of the Rhine. Therefore, the region of Hohenlohe is presently located for the most part in the north eastern part of the State of Baden-Württemberg (forming the counties of Hohenlohe, Schwäbisch Hall and the southern part of Main-Tauber-Kreis), with smaller parts in the Bavarian administrative districts of Middle Franconia and Lower Franconia. The Hohenlohisch dialect is part of the East Franconian German dialect group and the population still values its traditional distinct identity.

== Rulers ==
=== House of Hohenlohe ===
==== Partitions of Hohenlohe under Hohenlohe rule ====
Lordship of Hohenlohe (1192–1209)
Lordship of Brauneck (1209–1390)
Lordship of Weikersheim (1209–1450); Raised to: County of Weikersheim (1st creation) (1450–1545) | Lordship of Uffenheim (1255–1412)
Lordship of Haltenbergstetten (1268–1368)
County of Waldenburg (1472–1679) (called Catholic branch since 1667) | County of Langenburg (1st creation) (1568–1590) | County of Weikersheim (2nd creation) (1568–1684) | County of Neuenstein (1st creation) (1503–1606) (Protestant branch)
County of Langenburg (2nd creation) (1610–1764); Raised to: Principality of Langenburg (1764–1806)
County of Neuenstein (3rd creation) (1610–1698)
County of Pfedelbach (1600–1728) | County of Schillingsfürst (1600–1744); Raised to: Principality of Schillingsfürst (1744–1806)
County of Kirchberg (1699–1764); Raised to: Principality of Kirchberg (1764–1806) | County of Ohringen (1641–1805)
County of Bartenstein (1635–1744); Raised to: Principality of Bartenstein (1744–1806) | County of Ingelfingen (1699–1764); Raised to: Principality of Ingelfingen (1764–1806)
(mediatized to Württemberg in 1806)

==== Table of rulers ====
| Ruler | Born | Reign | Ruling part | Consort | Death | Notes |
|---|---|---|---|---|---|---|
| Henry | 1144; Son of Conrad of Weikersheim | 1192–1212 | Lordship of Hohenlohe | Adelaide of Langenberg/ Gundelfingen (d.1230) six children | 1212 aged 67–68 | First confirmed member of the family who held the lordship. |
| Godfrey I | 1190; First son of Henry and Adelaide of Langenberg/ Gundelfingen | 1212–1255 | Lordship of Weikersheim | Richeza of Bocksberg six children | 1255 aged 64–65 | Children of Henry, divided the land. Conrad was also count at Molise and Romagna. |
| Conrad I | c.1195 Second son of Henry and Adelaide of Langenberg/ Gundelfingen | 1212–1250 | Lordship of Brauneck | Petrissa of Büdingen five children | c.1250 aged 54–55 | Children of Henry, divided the land. Conrad was also count at Molise and Romagna. |
| Godfrey I | 1232; First son of Conrad I and Petrissa of Büdingen | 1250–1306 | Lordship of Brauneck | Willibirg (d.1272/78) c.1265 six children Elisabeth of Falkenstein c.1279 six children | 1312 aged 31–32 | Children of Conrad I, divided the land. It's possible that a Godfrey that supposedly died in 1273 is this one who died in 1312. Godfrey abdicated in 1306. |
| Henry | c.1235 Second son of Conrad I and Petrissa of Büdingen | 1250 – 4 October 1267 | Lordship of Haltenbergstetten | Unknown three children | 4 October 1267 aged 31–32 | Children of Conrad I, divided the land. It's possible that a Godfrey that supposedly died in 1273 is this one who died in 1312. Godfrey abdicated in 1306. |
| Albert I | c.1240 First son of Godfrey I and Richeza of Bocksberg | 1255–1269 | Lordship of Uffenheim | Kunigunde of Henneberg; May 1240 two children Udelhild of Berg-Schelklingen; 1257 (d.1271) two children | 1269 aged 28–29 | Children of Godfrey I, divided the land. |
| Crato I | 1242; Second son of Godfrey I and Richeza of Bocksberg | 1255 – 19 September 1313 | Lordship of Weikersheim | Willibirg of Wertheim (d.8 January 1279) three children Margaret of Truendingen (d.11 November 1294); 1280 six children Agnes of Württemberg (d.27 September 1305); 1295 two children | 19 September 1313 aged 70–71 | Children of Godfrey I, divided the land. |
| Conrad I | c.1245 Third son of Godfrey I and Richeza of Bocksberg | 1255 – 30 July 1277 | Lordship of Weikersheim (at Röttingen) | Kunigunde (d.1268) three children | 30 July 1277 aged 31–32 | Children of Godfrey I, divided the land. |
| Gebhard | c.1250? Son of Henry | 4 October 1267 – 3 November 1300 | Lordship of Haltenbergstetten | Adelaide of Taufers (d.1300) c.1275 six children | 3 November 1300 aged 49–50 | |
| Godfrey II | c.1240 Son of Albert I and Kunigunde of Henneberg | 1269–1290 | Lordship of Uffenheim | Elisabeth of Nuremberg c.1280 six children | 1290; Erfurt aged 49–50 | Children of Albert I, divided the land, but it was mostly and rapidly united again: Schelklingen reunited with Uffenheim after Albert's death; Wernsberg joined in the next generation. |
| Frederick | c.1260 First son of Albert I and Udelhild of Berg-Schelklingen | 1269–1290 | Lordship of Uffenheim (at Wernsberg) | Sophia of Henneberg (d.1313) four children | 1290 aged 29–30 | Children of Albert I, divided the land, but it was mostly and rapidly united again: Schelklingen reunited with Uffenheim after Albert's death; Wernsberg joined in the next generation. |
| Albert (II) | c.1260 Second son of Albert I and Udelhild of Berg-Schelklingen | 1269 – 16 April 1338 | Lordship of Uffenheim (at Schelklingen) | Unknown two children Hedwig of Castell; 1309 (d.1331) no children | 16 April 1338 aged 77–78 | Children of Albert I, divided the land, but it was mostly and rapidly united again: Schelklingen reunited with Uffenheim after Albert's death; Wernsberg joined in the next generation. |
Schelklingen reabsorbed in Uffenheim
| Godfrey II | c.1260 Son of Conrad I and Kunigunde | 30 July 1277 – 6 August 1290 | Lordship of Weikersheim (at Röttingen) | Elisabeth of Wertheim (d.6 February 1335) one child | 6 August 1290 aged 29–30 | |
| Albert II | c.1270 Son of Godfrey II and Elisabeth of Nuremberg | 1290 – 30 November 1312 | Lordship of Uffenheim | Adelaide of Berg-Schelklingen (d.18 September 1338); 7 November 1289 seven children | 30 November 1312 aged 41–42 | |
| Henry | c.1280 Son of Frederick and Sophia of Henneberg | 1290 – 25 October 1329 | Lordship of Uffenheim (at Wernsberg) | Elisabeth of Henneberg (d.29 November 1329); 1300 no children | 25 October 1329 aged 48–49 | After his death Wernsberg reunited with Uffenheim. |
Wernsberg reabsorbed in Uffenheim
| Regency of Crato I, Lord of Weikersheim (1290) | | | | | | After Conrad's death, Rottingen returned to Weikersheim. |
| Conrad II | c.1280 Son of Godfrey II and Elisabeth of Wertheim | 6 August – 8 December 1290 | Lordship of Weikersheim (at Röttingen) | Unmarried | 8 December 1290 aged 9–10? | After Conrad's death, Rottingen returned to Weikersheim. |
Röttingen reabsorbed to Weikersheim
| Ulrich I | c.1270? Son of Gebhard and Adelaide of Taufers | 3 November 1300 – 1332 | Lordship of Haltenbergstetten | Matilda of Weinsberg (c.1300? – 1332); 3 April 1284 eight children | 1332 aged 61–62 | |
| Godfrey II | c.1293 Son of Godfrey I and Willibirg | 1306–1354 | Lordship of Brauneck | Margaret (d.c.1335) two children | 1354 aged 64–65? | Teutonic Knight, eventually succeeded in the lordship. |
| Louis | c.1290 Son of Albert II and Adelaide of Berg-Schelklingen | 30 November 1312 – 1356 | Lordship of Uffenheim | Elisabeth of Southern Nassau; 1326 eight children | 1356 aged 65–66 | |
| Conrad | c.1270 Son of Crato I and Willibirg of Wertheim | 19 September 1313 – 1330 | Lordship of Weikersheim | Unknown two children | 1330 aged 59–60 | Children of Crato I, ruled jointly. |
| Crato II | c.1280 Son of Crato I and Margaret of Truendingen | 19 September 1313 – 8 May 1344 | Lordship of Weikersheim | Adelaide Matilda of Württemberg (1295/1300 – 13 September 1342); 1306 two children | 8 May 1344 aged 63–64 | Children of Crato I, ruled jointly. |
| Ulrich II | c.1300? Son of Ulrich I and Matilda of Weinsberg | 1332–1347 | Lordship of Haltenbergstetten | Unknown six children Adelaide of Hohenlohe-Weikersheim; 1 June 1337 no children | 1347 aged 46–47 | |
| Crato III | 1315; Son of Crato II and Adelaide Matilda of Württemberg | 8 May 1344 – 16 November 1371 | Lordship of Weikersheim | Anna of Leuchtenberg c.1340 nine children | 16 November 1371 aged 55–56 | |
| Ulrich III | c.1320 Son of Ulrich II | 1347 – 17 February 1367 | Lordship of Haltenbergstetten | Elisabeth of Merenberg (d.1375); 1345 one child | 17 February 1367 aged 46–47 | |
| Godfrey III | 1320; Son of Godfrey II and Margaret | 1354–1368 | Lordship of Brauneck | Agnes of Castell (d.14 September 1395); 1334 five children | 1368 aged 47–48 | |
| Godfrey III | 1344; First son of Louis and Elisabeth of Southern Nassau | 1356–1387 | Lordship of Uffenheim | Anna of Henneberg-Schleusingen (d. 27 Jul 1385/1388); 1369 three children | 1387 aged 42–43 | Children of Louis, divided the inheritance. After Gerlach's death, Entze returned to Uffenheim. |
| Gerlach | c.1345 Second son of Louis and Elisabeth of Southern Nassau | 1356 – 27 January 1392 | Lordship of Uffenheim (at Entze) | Margaret of Bavaria; 1356 no children | 27 January 1392 aged 46–47 | Children of Louis, divided the inheritance. After Gerlach's death, Entze returned to Uffenheim. |
Entze reabsorbed in Uffenheim
| Ulrich IV | c.1350? Son of Ulrich III and Elisabeth of Merenberg | 17 February 1367 – 19 April 1381 | Lordship of Haltenbergstetten | Unmarried | 19 April 1381 aged 30–31 | Left no descendants. After his death Haltenbergstetten returned to Brauneck domain. |
Haltenbergstetten reannexed in Brauneck
| Conrad II | c.1340 Son of Godfrey III and Agnes of Castell | 1368 – 7 August 1390 | Lordship of Brauneck | Anna of Hohenlohe-Weikersheim; 15 March 1388 one child | 7 August 1390 aged 49–50 | Left no male descendants. After his death Brauneck was annexed to Weikersheim. |
Brauneck annexed to Weikersheim
| Crato IV | 1351; First son of Crato III and Anna of Leuchtenberg | 16 November 1371 – 24 November 1399 | Lordship of Weikersheim | Agnes of Ziegenhain c.1365/70 no children Elisabeth of Sponheim (d.1381); 1374 two children | 24 November 1399 aged 48–49 | Children of Crato III, ruled jointly. In 1379 Godfrey resigned and was replaced by his brother Ulrich. |
| Godfrey III | c.1360 Second son of Crato III and Anna of Leuchtenberg | 16 November 1371 – 1379 | Lordship of Weikersheim | Unmarried | 13 September 1413 aged 52–53 | Children of Crato III, ruled jointly. In 1379 Godfrey resigned and was replaced by his brother Ulrich. |
| Ulrich | c.1360 Third son of Crato III and Anna of Leuchtenberg | 1379 – 6 December 1407 | Lordship of Weikersheim | Unmarried | 6 December 1407 aged 46–47 | Children of Crato III, ruled jointly. In 1379 Godfrey resigned and was replaced by his brother Ulrich. |
| John | 1370; Son of Godfrey III and Anna of Henneberg-Schleusingen | 1387 – 24 October 1412 | Lordship of Uffenheim | Unmarried | 24 October 1412 near Kremmen aged 41–42 | Left no descendants. After his death Uffenheim (with exceptions) re-merged in Weikersheim. |
Uffenheim (with exceptions) re-merged in Weikersheim
| Anna | c.1370 Daughter of Crato IV and Elisabeth of Sponheim | 24 November 1399 – 11 October 1410 | Lordship of Weikersheim (at Kirchheimbolanden and Stauf) | Philipp I, Count of Nassau-Weilburg; 1385 one child | 11 October 1410 aged 39–40 | Inherited some lands from her father, which, by marriage, came to the House of Nassau. |
Kirchheimbolanden and Stauf were inherited by the House of Nassau
| Albert I | 1371; Fifth son of Crato III and Anna of Leuchtenberg | 6 December 1407 – 16 June 1429 | Lordship of Weikersheim | Elisabeth of Hanau; 1413 seven children | 16 June 1429 | Younger brother of Crato IV and Ulrich. |
| Elisabeth | c.1370 Daughter of Godfrey III and Anna of Henneberg-Schleusingen | 24 October 1412 – 1445 | Lordship of Uffenheim (at Speckfeld) | Frederick III Schenk of Limpurg; 1394 eleven children | 1445 aged 74–75 | Heir of her brother. After her death, her part of the inheritance went to her children. |
Speckfeld annexed to the Schenk von Limpurg family
| Regency of Elisabeth of Hanau (1429–1432) | | | | | | Children of Albert I, divided their inheritance. After Albert's death, Neuenstein was reabsorbed by Waldenburg. |
| Crato V | 1416; First son of Albert I and Elisabeth of Hanau | 16 June 1429 – 31 March 1472 | Lordship of Weikersheim (until 1450) County of Weikersheim (from 1450) (at Waldenburg) | Margaret of Oettingen; 1431 seven children | 31 March 1472; 55–56 | Children of Albert I, divided their inheritance. After Albert's death, Neuenstein was reabsorbed by Waldenburg. |
| Albert II | 1419; Second son of Albert I and Elisabeth of Hanau | 16 June 1429 – 4 September 1490 | Lordship of Weikersheim (until 1450) County of Weikersheim (from 1450) (at Neuenstein) | Unmarried | 4 September 1490; 70–71 | Children of Albert I, divided their inheritance. After Albert's death, Neuenstein was reabsorbed by Waldenburg. |
| Godfrey IV | c.1440 First son of Crato V and Margaret of Oettingen | 31 March 1472 – 4 October 1497 | County of Weikersheim | Hippolyta of Wilhelmsdorf; 1478 six children | 4 October 1497 aged 56–57 | Children of Crato V, shared rule firstly, and then divided their inheritance. In 1490 Crato VI inherited also the part of the inheritance of his uncle, Albert II. |
| Crato VI | 1445; Neuenstein; Second son of Crato V and Margaret of Oettingen | 31 March 1472 – 2 August 1503 | County of Waldenburg | Helena of Württemberg; 26 February 1476; Waldenburg seventeen children | 2 August 1503; Neuenstein aged 50–51 | Children of Crato V, shared rule firstly, and then divided their inheritance. In 1490 Crato VI inherited also the part of the inheritance of his uncle, Albert II. |
| John | c.1470 Son of Godfrey IV and Hippolyta of Wilhelmsdorf | 4 October 1497 – 1509 | County of Weikersheim | Elisabeth of Leuchtenberg (d.4 May 1516); 14 November 1491 four children | 1509; Schillingsfürst aged 38–39 | |
| Albert III | 1478; Neuenstein; First son of Crato VI and Helena of Württemberg | 2 August 1503 – 19 August 1551 | County of Neuenstein | Wandelberta of Hohenzollern (1484–1553); 15 March 1507; Rothenburg no children | 19 August 1551; Neuenstein aged 73–74 | Children of Crato VI, divided their inheritance. |
| George I | 17 January 1488; Neuenstein; Fifth son of Crato VI and Helena of Württemberg | 2 August 1503 – 16 March 1551 | County of Waldenburg | Praxedis of Sulz (1495 – 14 April 1521); 1514 six children Helena of Waldburg-Zeil; 1 February 1529 eight children | 16 March 1551; Waldenburg aged 63 | Children of Crato VI, divided their inheritance. |
| Wolfgang I | c.1490 Son of John and Elisabeth of Leuchtenberg | 1509 – 24 December 1545 | County of Weikersheim | Walpurga of Henneberg-Schleusingen; 18/19 November 1534; Schleusingen no children | 24 December 1545 aged 54–55 | Left no descendants. Weikersheim reverted to Waldenburg. |
Weikersheim was re-absorbed in Waldenburg
| Louis Casimir | 12 January 1517; Öhringen; Son of George Iand Praxedis of Sulz | 19 August 1551 – 24 August 1568 | County of Neuenstein | Anna of Solms-Laubach; 20 November 1554; Heuchlingen six children | 24 August 1568; Neuenstein aged 51 | Children of George I, divided their inheritance, division recognised in 1553. |
| Eberhard | 11 October 1535; Son of George Iand Helena of Waldburg-Zeil | 19 August 1551 – 10 March 1570 | County of Waldenburg | Agatha of Tübingen; 1529 eight children | 10 March 1570; Waldenburg aged 35 | Children of George I, divided their inheritance, division recognised in 1553. |
| Wolfgang II | 14 June 1546; Waldenburg; Second son of Louis Casimir and Anna of Solms-Laubach | 24 August 1568 – 28 March 1610 | County of Weikersheim | Magdalena of Nassau-Dillenburg; 27 January 1567; Dillenburg fourteen children | 28 March 1610; Weikersheim aged 63 | Children of Louis Casimir, divided the land, but it was quickly reunited under Weikersheim line, as Philip and Frederick didn't have surviving male children. |
| Philip | 17 February 1550; Third son of Louis Casimir and Anna of Solms-Laubach | 24 August 1568 – 6 March 1606 | County of Neuenstein | Maria of Orange-Nassau (12 November 1522 – 9 May 1594); 20 November 1554; Buren one child | 6 March 1606 aged 56 | Children of Louis Casimir, divided the land, but it was quickly reunited under Weikersheim line, as Philip and Frederick didn't have surviving male children. |
| Frederick | 27 June 1553; Neuenstein; Fourth son of Louis Casimir and Anna of Solms-Laubach | 24 August 1568 – 12 April 1590 | County of Langenburg | Elisabeth of Brunswick-Lüneburg (19 October 1565 – 17 July 1621); 12 May 1685; Celle one child | 12 April 1590; Langenburg aged 36 | Children of Louis Casimir, divided the land, but it was quickly reunited under Weikersheim line, as Philip and Frederick didn't have surviving male children. |
| Regency of Agatha of Tübingen (1570–1577) | | | | | | |
| George Frederick I the Elder | 30 April 1562; Waldenburg; Son of Eberhard and Agatha of Tübingen | 1570 – 22 October 1600 | County of Waldenburg | Dorothea Reuss of Gera (1570–1631); 21 August 1586; Waldenburg six children | 22 October 1600; Waldenburg aged 38 | |
| Regency of Dorothea Reuss of Gera (1600–1615) | | | | | | Children of George Frederick I, divided their inheritance. |
| Louis Eberhard | 19 January 1590; Waldenburg; First son of George Frederick I and Dorothea Reuss of Gera | 22 October 1600 – 3 November 1650 | County of Pfedelbach | Dorothea of Erbach; 28 October 1610; Waldenburg eight children | 3 November 1650; Pfedelbach aged 60 | Children of George Frederick I, divided their inheritance. |
| Philip Henry | 3 January/June 1591; Waldenburg; Second son of George Frederick I and Dorothea Reuss of Gera | 22 October 1600 – 25 March 1644 | County of Waldenburg | Dorothea Walpurga of Hohenlohe-Neuenstein; 7 May 1615; Neuenstein eleven children | 20/25 March 1644; Waldenburg aged 52–53 | Children of George Frederick I, divided their inheritance. |
| George Frederick II the Younger | 16 June 1595; Waldenburg; Third son of George Frederick I and Dorothea Reuss of Gera | 22 October 1600 – 20 September 1635 | County of Schillingsfürst | Dorothea Sophia of Solms-Hohensolms; 7 April 1616; Butzbach sixteen children | 20 September 1635; Frankfurt am Main aged 40 | Children of George Frederick I, divided their inheritance. |
| George Frederick the Faithful | 5 September 1569; Neuenstein; First son of Wolfgang II and Magdalena of Nassau-Dillenburg | 28 March 1610 – 7 July 1645 | County of Weikersheim | Eva of Waldstein (d.24 May 1631) no children Maria Magdalena of Oettingen-Oettingen; 23 April 1620; Oettingen one child | 7 July 1645; Langenburg aged 75 | Children of Wolfgang, divided the land once more. Weikersheim went once more to Neuenstein, after George Frederick's death without male descendants. |
| Crato VII | 14 November 1582; Langenburg; Third son of Wolfgang II and Magdalena of Nassau-Dillenburg | 28 March 1610 – 11 September 1641 | County of Neuenstein | Sophia of the Palatinate-Birkenfeld; 17 March 1615; Neuenstein fourteen children | 11 September 1641; Regensburg aged 58 | Children of Wolfgang, divided the land once more. Weikersheim went once more to Neuenstein, after George Frederick's death without male descendants. |
| Philip Ernest | 11 August 1584; Langenburg; Fourth son of Wolfgang II and Magdalena of Nassau-Dillenburg | 28 March 1610 – 29 January 1628 | County of Langenburg | Anna Maria of Solms-Sonnewalde; 15 January 1609; Sonnewalde eleven children | 29 January 1628; Weikersheim aged 43 | Children of Wolfgang, divided the land once more. Weikersheim went once more to Neuenstein, after George Frederick's death without male descendants. |
| Regency of Anna Maria of Solms-Sonnewalde (1628–1639) | | | | | | Children of Philip Ernest, divided their inheritance, but it was quickly reunited after Joachim Albert's death. |
| Joachim Albert | 3 August 1619; First son of Philip Ernest and Anna Maria of Solms-Sonnewalde | 29 January 1628 – 15 July 1675 | County of Langenburg (at Kirchberg) | Unmarried | 15 July 1675 aged 55 | Children of Philip Ernest, divided their inheritance, but it was quickly reunited after Joachim Albert's death. |
| Henry Frederick | 7 September 1625; Langenburg; Second son of Philip Ernest and Anna Maria of Solms-Sonnewalde | 29 January 1628 – 2 June 1699 | County of Langenburg (at Langenburg proper) | Eleanor Magdalena of Hohenlohe-Weikersheim (22 March 1635 – 14 November 1657); 25 January 1652 four children Juliana Dorothea of Castell-Remlingen; 5 July 1658 sixteen children | 2 June 1699; Langenburg aged 73 | Children of Philip Ernest, divided their inheritance, but it was quickly reunited after Joachim Albert's death. |
| Regency of Dorothea Sophia of Solms-Hohensolms (1635–1660) | | | | | | Children of George Frederick II, divided their inheritance. |
| Christian | 31 August 1627; Schillingsfürst; Fifth son ofGeorge Frederick II and Dorothea Sophia of Solms-Hohensolms | 20 September 1635 – 13 June 1675 | County of Bartenstein | Lucia of Hatzfeld and Gleichen (1634/35 – 30 May 1716); 18 February 1658; Haltenbergstetten nine children | 13 June 1675; Neumarkt in der Oberpfalz aged 47 | Children of George Frederick II, divided their inheritance. |
| Louis Gustav | 8 June 1634; Schillingsfürst; Eighth son ofGeorge Frederick II and Dorothea Sophia of Solms-Hohensolms | 20 September 1635 – 21 February 1697 | County of Schillingsfürst | Maria Eleanor of Hatzfeld (1632 – 13 June 1667); 18 February 1658; Haltenbergstetten seven children Anna Barbara of Schönborn (18 December 1648 – 6 March 1721); 15/17 July 1668; Mainz eight children | 21 February 1697; Frankfurt am Main aged 62 | Children of George Frederick II, divided their inheritance. |
| John Frederick I | 31 July 1617; NeuensteinFirst son of Crato VII and Sophia of the Palatinate-Birkenfeld | 11 September 1641 – 1702 | County of Ohringen | Louise Ammonna of Schleswig-Holstein-Norburg (15 January 1642 – 11 June 1685); 28 August 1665; Neuenstein thirteen children | 17 October 1702; Öhringen aged 85 | Children of Crato VII, divided the land once more. Siegfried inherited his portion later than his brothers, as his uncle and then possessor of his feud was still alive by the time of the partition of the brothers. Weikersheim, Neuenstein and Kunzelsau, again without heirs, were all annexed to the newly created county of Ohringen. |
| Siegfried | 2 August 1619; NeuensteinThird son of Crato VII and Sophia of the Palatinate-Birkenfeld | 11 September 1641 – 26 April 1684 | County of Weikersheim | Maria of Kaunitz (1620 – 13 February 1674); 1662; Neuenstein no children Sophia Amalia of the Palatinate-Zweibrücken; 1678; Meisenheim no children | 26 April 1684; Weikersheim aged 64 | Children of Crato VII, divided the land once more. Siegfried inherited his portion later than his brothers, as his uncle and then possessor of his feud was still alive by the time of the partition of the brothers. Weikersheim, Neuenstein and Kunzelsau, again without heirs, were all annexed to the newly created county of Ohringen. |
| Wolfgang Julius | 3 August 1622; NeuensteinFourth son of Crato VII and Sophia of the Palatinate-Birkenfeld | 11 September 1641 – 26 December 1698 | County of Neuenstein | Sophie Eleanor of Holstein-Sonderburg-Plön (1 August 1644 – 22 January 1689); 25 August 1666; Neuenstein fourteen children Barbara Franziska of Welz-Wilmersdorf; 4 September 1689; Wilhermsdorf no children | 26 December 1698; Frankfurt am Main aged 76 | Children of Crato VII, divided the land once more. Siegfried inherited his portion later than his brothers, as his uncle and then possessor of his feud was still alive by the time of the partition of the brothers. Weikersheim, Neuenstein and Kunzelsau, again without heirs, were all annexed to the newly created county of Ohringen. |
| John Louis | 1 June 1625; NeuensteinFifth son of Crato VII and Sophia of the Palatinate-Birkenfeld | 11 September 1641 – 15 August 1689 | County of Neuenstein (at Kunzelsau) | Magdalena Sophia of Oettingen-Oettingen; 15 March 1681; Neuenstein no children | 15 August 1689; Neuenstein aged 64 | Children of Crato VII, divided the land once more. Siegfried inherited his portion later than his brothers, as his uncle and then possessor of his feud was still alive by the time of the partition of the brothers. Weikersheim, Neuenstein and Kunzelsau, again without heirs, were all annexed to the newly created county of Ohringen. |
Neuenstein, Kunzelsau and Weikersheim annexed to Ohringen
| Wolfgang Frederick | 17 April 1617; Waldenburg; First son of Philip Henry and Dorothea Walpurga of Hohenlohe-Neuenstein | 25 March 1644 – 28 March 1658 | County of Waldenburg | Eva Christina of Hohenlohe-Langenburg; 24 June 1646; Waldenburg nine children | 28 March 1658; Waldenburg aged 40 | Left no descendants, and was succeeded by his brother. |
| Frederick Crato | 27 November 1623; Pfedelbach; First son of Louis Eberhard and Dorothea of Erbach | 3 November 1650 – 7 April 1681 | County of Pfedelbach | Floriana Ernestina of Württemberg-Wiltingen; 18 May 1657; Leonberg five children | 7 April 1681; Pfedelbach aged 57 | Left no descendants, and was succeeded by his brother. |
| Philip Godfrey | 6 June 1618; Waldenburg; Second son of Philip Henry and Dorothea Walpurga of Hohenlohe-Neuenstein | 28 March 1658 – 14 December 1679 | County of Waldenburg | Anna Christina of Limburg-Sontheim (5 December 1618 – 28 May 1685); 2 September 1649 six children | 14 December 1679; Waldenburg aged 61 | Brother of the childless Wolfgang Frederick, left no male descendants. His daughter became the heiress. |
| Regency of Lucia of Hatzfeld and Gleichen and Louis Gustav, Count of Hohenlohe-Schillingsfürst (1675–1686) | | | | | | |
| Philip Charles | 28 September 1668; Schillingsfürst; Son of Christian and Lucia of Hatzfeld and Gleichen | 13 June 1675 – 15 January 1729 | County of Bartenstein | Sophia Maria Anna of Hohenlohe-Schillingsfürst (1673 – 17 August 1698); 17 May 1695; Frankfurt am Main one child Sophia Leopoldina of Hesse-Wanfried; 12 June 1700; Altenberg eight children | 15 January 1729; Wetzlar aged 61 | |
| Dorothea Elisabeth | 12 October 1650; Waldenburg; Daughter of Philip Godfrey and Anna Christina of Limburg-Sontheim | 14 December 1679 – 29 November 1711 | County of Waldenburg | Hezekiah; 27 May 1666; Waldenburg ten children | 29 November 1711; Ingelfingen aged 61 | Heiress of half of Waldenburg, which was inherited by Pfedelbach; the other part was inherited by Schillingsfurst. |
Waldenburg divided between Pfedelbach and Schillingsfürst
| Hezekiah | 8 September 1631; Pfedelbach; Second son of Louis Eberhard and Dorothea of Erbach | 7 April 1681 – 6 February 1685 | County of Pfedelbach | Dorothea Elisabeth; 27 May 1666; Waldenburg ten children | 6 February 1685 | Brother of his predecessor, Frederick Crato. Married the heiress of Waldenburg. |
| Louis Godfrey | 6 December 1668; Pfedelbach; Son of Hezekiah and Dorothea Elisabeth | 6 February 1685 – 18 September 1728 | County of Pfedelbach | Louise Charlotte of Hohenlohe-Langenburg (25 April 1667 – 25 August 1747); 27 October 1689; Langenburg no children | 18 September 1728; Pfedelbach aged 59 | Left no descendants. The county was annexed to Bartenstein. |
Pfedelbach annexed to Bartenstein
| Philip Ernest | 29 December 1663; Schillingsfürst; Son of Louis Gustav and Maria Eleanor of Hatzfeld | 21 February 1697 – 29 November 1759 | County of Schillingsfürst (until 1744) Principality of Schillingsfürst (from 1744) | Barbara Franziska of Welz-Wilmersdorf; 22 June 1701; Wilhermsdorf four children Maria Anna of Oettingen-Wallerstein (28 August 1680 – 8 September 1749); 6 January 1719; Wallerstein one child | 29 November 1759; Schillingsfürst aged 96 | |
| Albert Wolfgang | 6 July 1659; Langenburg; First son of Henry Frederick and Juliana Dorothea of Castell-Remlingen | 2 June 1699 – 17 April 1715 | County of Langenburg | Sophia Amalia of Nassau-Saarbrücken; 22 August 1686; Langenburg twelve children | 17 April 1715; Langenburg aged 55 | Children of Henry Frederick, divided the land. |
| Christian Crato | 15 July 1668; Langenburg; Fourth son of Henry Frederick and Juliana Dorothea of Castell-Remlingen | 2 June 1699 – 2 October 1743 | County of Ingelfingen | Maria Catharina Sophia of Hohenlohe-Pfedelbach; 6 December 1701; Pfedelbach seventeen children | 2 October 1743; Ingelfingen aged 75 | Children of Henry Frederick, divided the land. |
| Frederick Eberhard | 24 November 1672; Langenburg; Fifth son of Henry Frederick and Juliana Dorothea of Castell-Remlingen | 2 June 1699 – 23 August 1737 | County of Kirchberg | Frederica Albertina of Erbach-Fürstenau; 18 January 1702; Pfedelbach four children Augusta Sophia of Württemberg (24 September 1691 – 1 March 1743); 5 December 1709; Neuenstadt am Kocher one child | 23 August 1737 | Children of Henry Frederick, divided the land. |
| Frederick Crato | 22 February 1667; Öhringen; First son of John Frederick I and Louise Ammonna of Schleswig-Holstein-Norburg | 17 October 1702 – 23 August 1709 | County of Ohringen (until 1764) Principality of Ohringen (from 1764) | Christina Elisabeth of Erbach-Fürstenau; 29 September 1695; Fürstenau no children | 23 August 1709; Weikersheim aged 41–42 | Children of John Frederick I, divided the land (Weikersheim was briefly revived), but Ohringen was quickly reunited after John Frederick's brothers deaths with no surviving descendants. |
| John Ernest | 24 March 1670; Ohrdruf; Second son of John Frederick I and Louise Ammonna of Schleswig-Holstein-Norburg | 17 October – 16 November 1702 | County of Ohringen (until 1764) Principality of Ohringen (from 1764) | Eleonora Juliana of Hohenlohe-Langenburg ( 1 October 1669 – 11 April 1750); 12 January 1699; Langenburg no children | 16 November 1702; Basel aged 32 | Children of John Frederick I, divided the land (Weikersheim was briefly revived), but Ohringen was quickly reunited after John Frederick's brothers deaths with no surviving descendants. |
| John Frederick II | 22 July 1683; Öhringen; Fourth son of John Frederick I and Louise Ammonna of Schleswig-Holstein-Norburg | 17 October 1702 – 24 August 1765 | County of Ohringen (until 1764) Principality of Ohringen (from 1764) | Dorothea Sophia of Hesse-Darmstadt; 13 February 1710; Darmstadt seven children | 24 August 1765; Öhringen aged 82 | Children of John Frederick I, divided the land (Weikersheim was briefly revived), but Ohringen was quickly reunited after John Frederick's brothers deaths with no surviving descendants. |
| Charles Louis | 23 September 1674; Ohrdruf; Third son of John Frederick I and Louise Ammonna of Schleswig-Holstein-Norburg | 17 October 1702 – 5 May 1756 | County of Weikersheim | Dorothea Charlotte of Brandenburg-Kulmbach; 7 August 1711; Wefferlingen no children Elisabeth Friederika Sophia of Oettingen-Oettingen; 11 November 1713; Oettingen two children | 5 May 1756; Weikersheim aged 81 | Children of John Frederick I, divided the land (Weikersheim was briefly revived), but Ohringen was quickly reunited after John Frederick's brothers deaths with no surviving descendants. |
Weikersheim reabsorbed in Öhringen
| Louis | 20 October 1696; Langenburg; Son of Albert Wolfgang and Sophia Amalia of Nassau-Saarbrücken | 1715 – 16 January 1765 | County of Langenburg (until 1764) Principality of Langenburg (from 1764) | Eleonore of Nassau-Saarbrücken; 25 January 1723; Sonnewalde thirteen children | 16 January 1765; Langenburg aged 68 | |
| Charles Philip Francis | 12 July 1702; Wanfried; Son of Philip Charles and Sophia Leopoldina of Hesse-Wanfried | 1729 – 1 March 1763 | County of Bartenstein (until 1744) Principality of Bartenstein (from 1744) | Sophia Frederica of Hesse-Homburg; 26 September 1727; Strasbourg four children | 1 March 1763; Wetzlar aged 60 | |
| Charles August | 6 April 1707; Kirchberg an der Jagst; Son of Frederick Eberhard and Frederica Albertina of Erbach-Fürstenau | 23 August 1737 – 17 May 1767 | County of Kirchberg (until 1764) Principality of Kirchberg (from 1764) | Charlotte Amalia of Wolfstein (19 June 1706 – 24 October 1729); 4 January 1728; Salzburg one child Susanna Margaretha Louise of Auersperg (17 February 1712 – 12 September 1748); 1 June 1730; Nuremberg nine children Caroline Sophia von Hohenlohe-Ohringen (8 January 1715 – 21 August 1770); 21 January 1749; Hildburghausen two children | 17 May 1767; Kirchberg an der Jagst aged 60 | |
| Philip Henry | 10 September 1702; Ingelfingen; First son of Christian Crato and Maria Catharina Sophia of Hohenlohe-Waldenburg | 2 October 1743 – 5 April 1781 | County of Ingelfingen (until 1764) Principality of Ingelfingen (from 1764) | Albertina of Hohenlohe-Langenburg (29 January 1701 – 5 November 1773); 4 March 1727; Langenburg six children | 5 April 1781; Ingelfingen aged 78 | His heir predecesed him, and the principality was inherited by his brother. |
| Charles Albert I | 22 January 1719; Son of Philip Ernest and Maria Anna of Oettingen-Wallerstein | 1759 – 25 January 1793 | Principality of Schillingsfürst | Sophia Wilhelmina Maria of Lowenstein-Wertheim-Rochefort (7 August 1721 – 29 September 1749); 7 February 1740; Vienna five children Maria Josepha of Salm-Salm (7 August 1721 – 29 September 1749); 7 February 1740; Senones (Vosges) no children | 25 January 1793 aged 74 | |
| Louis Leopold | 15 November 1731; Siegen; Son of Charles Philip Francis and Sophia Frederica of Hesse-Homburg | 1763 – 14 June 1799 | Principality of Bartenstein | Frederika Polyxena of Limburg-Styrum (28 October 1738 – 26 February 1798); 6 May 1757; Schillingsfürst seven children | 14 June 1799; Kleinheubach aged 67 | |
| Louis Frederick Charles | 23 May 1723; Öhringen; Son of John Frederick II and Dorothea Sophia of Hesse-Darmstadt | 1765 – 27 July 1805 | County of Ohringen | Amalie of Saxe-Hildburghausen; 28 January 1749; Hildburghausen one child | 27 July 1805; Öhringen aged 82 | After his death with no heirs, Ohringen was annexed to Ingelfingen. |
Ohringen annexed to Ingelfingen
| Christian Albert | 27 March 1726; Langenburg; Son of Louis and Eleonore of Nassau-Saarbrücken | 16 January 1765 – 4 July 1789 | Principality of Langenburg | Caroline of Stolberg-Gedern; 13 May 1761; Gedern seven children | 4 July 1789; Ludwigsruhe aged 63 | |
| Christian Frederick | 19 October 1729; Kirchberg an der Jagst; Son of Charles August and Charlotte Amalia of Wolfstein | 17 May 1767 – 12 July 1806 | Principality of Kirchberg | Louise Charlotte of Hohenlohe-Langenburg (20 December 1732 – 5 August 1777); 4 June 1760; Langenburg two children Philippina Sophia Ernestina of Isenburg-Philippseich (1 November 1744 – 6 October 1819); 9 October 1778; Philippseich six children | 18 August 1819; Kirchberg an der Jagst aged 89 | In 1806, by German mediatisation, all Hohenlohe lands were absorbed into Württemberg. |
Kirchberg absorbed into Württemberg
| Henry August | 10 July 1715; Hermersberg Castle; Fifth son of Christian Crato and Maria Catharina Sophia of Hohenlohe-Waldenburg | 1781 – 13 February 1796 | Principality of Ingelfingen | Wilhelmina Eleonora of Hohenlohe-Ohringen (20 February 1717 – 30 July 1794); 26 September 1743; Ohringen eight children | 13 February 1796; Ingelfingen aged 80 | Brother of Philip Henry. |
| Charles Louis | 10 September 1762; Langenburg; Son of Christian Albert and Caroline of Stolberg-Gedern | 4 July 1789 – 12 July 1806 | Principality of Langenburg | Amalie Henriette of Solms-Baruth; 30 January 1789; Kliczków Castle thirteen children | 4 April 1825; Langenburg aged 62 | In 1806, by German mediatisation, all Hohenlohe lands were absorbed into Württemberg. |
Langenburg absorbed into Württemberg
| Charles Albert II | 21 February 1742; Schillingsfürst; Son of Charles Albert I and Sophia Wilhelmina Maria of Löwenstein-Wertheim-Rochefort | 25 January 1793 – 14 June 1796 | Principality of Schillingsfürst | Leopoldina of Lowenstein-Wertheim-Rochefort (28 December 1739 – 9 June 1765); 19 May 1761; Horazdiowitz two children Judith Anna Franziska Rewicki de Revisnier (8 September 1753 – 16 November 1836); 15 August 1773; Kazmir thirteen children | 14 June 1796; Schillingsfürst aged 54 | |
| Frederick Louis | 31 January 1746; Ingelfingen; Son of Henry August and Wilhelmina Eleonora of Hohenlohe-Ohringen | 1796 – 12 July 1806 | Principality of Ingelfingen | Amalia Louise Mariana of Hoym-Droyssig (6 October 1763 – 20 April 1840); 8 April 1782; Gleina (annulled 1799) eight children | 15 January 1818; Sławięcice aged 71 | In 1806, by German mediatisation, all Hohenlohe lands were absorbed (mediatised) into Württemberg. |
| Ingelfingen absorbed into Württemberg | | | | | | In 1806, by German mediatisation, all Hohenlohe lands were absorbed (mediatised) into Württemberg. |
| Charles Albert III | 28 February 1776; Vienna; Son of Charles Albert II and Judith Reviczky de Revisnye | 14 June 1796 – 12 July 1806 | Principality of Schillingsfürst | Maria Elisabeth Augusta of Isenburg-Birstein (8 September 1779 – 1 April 1803); 11 July 1797; Munich three children Maria Leopoldina of Fürstenberg (4 September 1791 – 10 January 1844); 130 May 1813; Heiligenberg four children | 15 June 1843; Bad Mergentheim aged 67 | In 1806, by German mediatisation, all Hohenlohe lands were absorbed (mediatised) into Württemberg. |
| Schillingsfurst absorbed into Württemberg | | | | | | In 1806, by German mediatisation, all Hohenlohe lands were absorbed (mediatised) into Württemberg. |
| Louis Aloysius | 12 December 1766; Bartenstein; Son of Louis Leopold and Frederika Polyxena of Limburg-Styrum | 14 June 1799 – 12 July 1806 | Principality of Bartenstein | Franziska Wilhelmina of Manderscheid-Blankenheim (13 March 1770 – 26 August 1789); 18 November 1786 one child Maria Crescentia of Salm-Reifferscheid (29 August 1768 – 4 April 1826); 19 January 1790; Bedburg two children | 31 May 1829; Lunéville aged 62 | In 1806, by German mediatisation, all Hohenlohe lands were absorbed (mediatised) into Württemberg. |
| Bartenstein absorbed into Württemberg | | | | | | In 1806, by German mediatisation, all Hohenlohe lands were absorbed (mediatised) into Württemberg. |

== See also ==
- Hohenlohe, for the page concerning the family itself.

== Literature ==
- Adolf Fischer, Geschichte des Hauses Hohenlohe, volume 2.2, W. Kohlhammer, Stuttgart 1871, p. 36
- Hermann Grote: Stammtafeln. Mit Anhang: Calendarium medii aevi (= Münzstudien. Bd. 9). Hahn, Leipzig 1877, (Digitalisat), p. 86–87
- Klaus Graf, Staufer-Überlieferungen aus Kloster Lorch (Traditions of the Hohenstaufen from Lorch Monastery), in: Sönke Lorenz et al. (Ed.): Von Schwaben bis Jerusalem. Facetten staufischer Geschichte. Sigmaringen (From Swabia to Jerusalem. Facets of Staufer history). Sigmaringen 1995, p. 209–240.
- John Morby, Uwe Ludwig, Handbuch der deutschen Dynastien. Artemis und Winkler, Düsseldorf 2006, ISBN 3-538-07228-0, p. 127–136
- Karl Schumm, Hohenlohe, zu. In: Neue Deutsche Biographie (NDB). volume 9, Duncker & Humblot, Berlin 1972, ISBN 3-428-00190-7
- Gerhard Taddey: «Stammtafeln des Hauses Hohenlohe». In: Handbuch der baden-württembergischen Geschichte, Fünfter Band, Klett-Cotta, Stuttgart 2007, ISBN 978-3-608-91371-2, p. 401–411
- K. Weller, Hohenlohisches Urkundenbuch 1153–1350, Stuttgart, 1899–1901
- Max Wilberg, Regenten-Tabellen, Eine Zusammenstellung der Herrscher von Ländern aller Erdteile bis zum Beginn des 20. Jahrhunderts, Beholtz, Frankfurt (Oder), 1906, p. 79–82.
- Constantin von Wurzbach: Hohenlohe, altes Herrengeschlecht in Franken. In: Biographisches Lexikon des Kaiserthums Oesterreich. 9. Theil. Kaiserlich-königliche Hof- und Staatsdruckerei, Vienna 1863, p. 200
