= Wolfgang, Count of Hohenlohe-Weikersheim =

Count Hohenlohe

- Born: 14 June 1546; Waldenburg
- Died: 28 March 1610 (aged 63); Weikersheim
- Noble family: House of Hohenlohe
- Spouse: Magdalena of Nassau-Dillenburg
- Issue: Philip Ernest
- Father: Louis Casimir of Hohenlohe-Waldenburg
- Mother: Anna of Solms-Lich

Wolfgang, Count of Hohenlohe-Weikersheim (14 June 1546 in Waldenburg – 28 March 1610 in Weikersheim) was the first Count of Hohenlohe-Weikersheim. He was the son of Louis Casimir of Hohenlohe-Waldenburg, who styled himself Count of Neuenstein, Langenburg, Weikersheim, Künzelsau, Kirchberg and Ingelfingen and his wife, Anna of Solms-Lich.

== Early life ==
Two of his brothers, Philip and Albert had served in the Nassau's army in 1572. Via his marriage with Magdalena of Nassau-Dillenburg, Wolfgang was also involved in the Eighty Years' War, although details of his involvement are scarce.

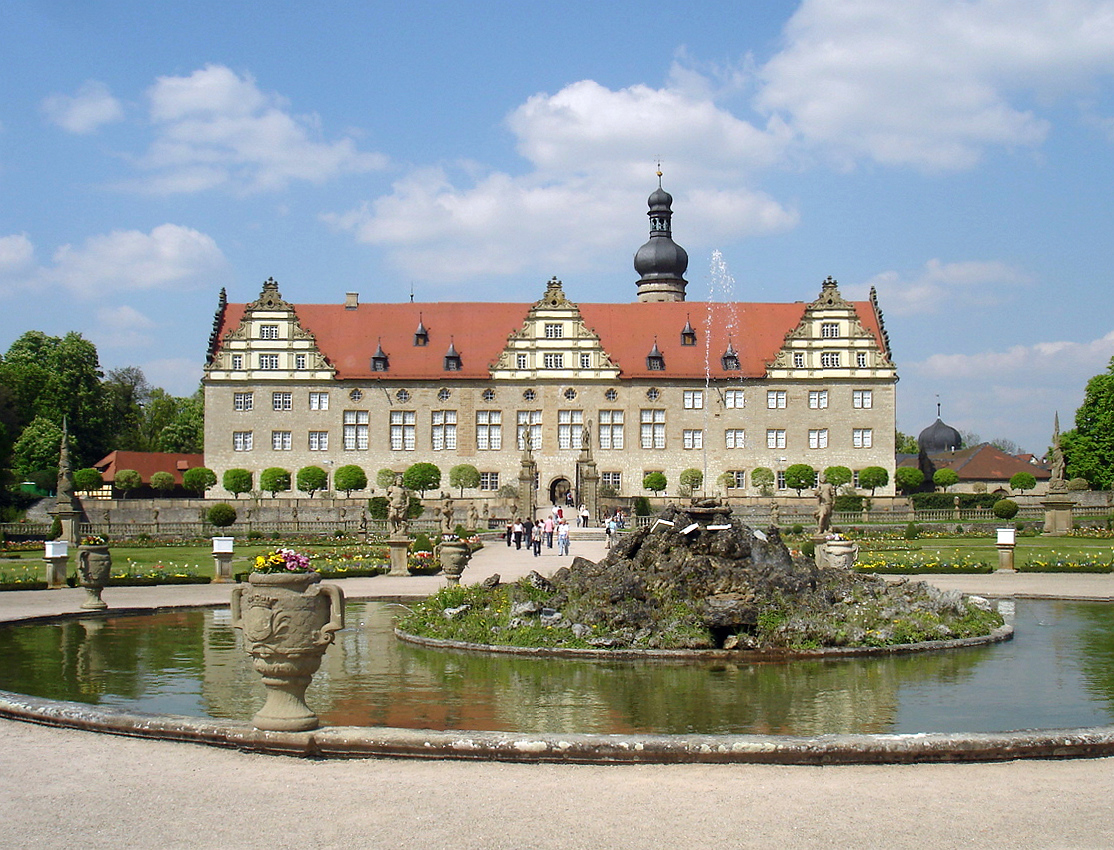
Weikersheim Castle

Wolfgang is best known for his reconstruction of Weikersheim Castle (Schloss Weikersheim) into a Renaissance palace. The new palace was designed by the Dutch architect Georg Robin. It was located in the Weikersheim part of the County of Hohenlohe, which Wolfgang had received when the county was divided after his father's death. He was interested in chemistry and his alchemical laboratory can still be seen there.

== Marriage and issue ==
In 1567, Wolfgang married Magdalena of Nassau-Dillenburg, a younger sister of William the Silent. Wolfgang and Magdalena had the following children:

- Catherine (1567–1615)
- Anna Agnes (2 September 1568 – 8 September 1616), married Philip Ernest of Gleichen-Tonna (d. 1619), the Count of Gleichen, Tonna, Spiegelberg and Pyrmont. He was the son of Count George of Gleichen-Tonna (d. 1570) and Countess Walpurga of Spiegelberg (d. 1599)
- George Frederick (5 September 1569 – 7 July 1645)
- Juliana (23 July 1571 – 8 March 1634), married Wolfgang II of Castell-Remlingen
- Magdalena (27 December 1572 – 2 April 1596), married Count Henry I of Reuss-Gera (10 June 1572 in Gera – 13 December 1635 in Gera). He was the son of Count Henry XVI of Reuss-Gera (1530–1572) and his second wife Dorothea of Solms-Sonnewalde (1547–1595)
- Praxedis (1 May 1574 – 15 August 1633)
- Marta (29 April 1575 – 19 December 1632), married John Casimir of Leiningen-Westerburg (d. 1635)
- Maria Elisabeth (12 June 1575 – 31 January 1605), married Johann Reinhard I, Count of Hanau-Lichtenberg (13 February 1569 in Bitche – 19 November 1625 in Lichtenberg). He was the son of Philip V, Count of Hanau-Lichtenberg and Ludowika Margaretha of Zweibrücken-Bitsch (19 July 1540 in Ingweiler – 15 December 1569 in Buchsweiler)
- Louis Casimir (4 February 1578 – 16 September 1604)
- Catherine Joanna (6 July 1579 – 28 November 1615)
- Crato VII (14 November 1582 – 11 October 1641), he married Countess Palatine Sophia of Zweibrücken-Birkenfeld, the daughter of Charles I, Count Palatine of Zweibrücken-Birkenfeld and Dorothea of Brunswick-Lüneburg
- Philip Ernest (11 August 1584 – 29 January 1628), married Anna Maria of Solms-Sonnewalde (14 January 1585 in Sonnewalde – 20 November 1634 in Ottweiler). She was a daughter of Otto of Solms-Sonnewalde (25 June 1550 in Sonnewalde – 29 January 1612 in Sonnewalde) and Anna Amalia of Nassau-Weilburg (12 October 1560 in Weilburg – 6 January 1635 in Estrasburgo). Anna Amalia was the eldest daughter of Albert, Count of Nassau-Weilburg.
- Albert (30 December 1585 – 21 October 1605)
- Wolfgang Ernest (11 August 1584 – 29 January 1588)
- Dorothea Walburga (20 September 1590 – 20 September 1656), married Philip Henry of Hohenlohe-Waldenburg (3 June 1591 in Waldenburg – 22 March 1644), who was Count of Hohenlohe-Waldenburg from 1615 until his death. He was a son of George Frederick I of Hohenlohe-Waldenburg (1562–1600) and Dorothea Reuss of Plauen (1570–1631)

== Ancestry ==
Ancestors of Wolfgang, Count of Hohenlohe-Weikersheim

16. Kraft V, Count of Hohenlohe-Weikersheim
8. Kraft VI, Count of Hohenlohe-Weikersheim
17. Margaret of Oettingen
4. Georg of Hohenlohe-Waldenburg
18. Ulrich V, Count of Württemberg
9. Helene of Württemberg
19. Margaret of Savoy
2. Louis Casimir of Hohenlohe-Waldenburg
20. Alwig X of Sulz-Klettgau
10. de:Rudolf V. von Sulz
21. Verena of Hirscher-Brandis
5. Praxede of Sulz
11. Margarete
1. Wolfgang, Count of Hohenlohe-Weikersheim
24. Kuno of Solms-Lich
12. Philip, Count of Solms-Lich
25. Walpurgis of Dhaun
6. Otto of Solms-Laubach
26. Philip I, Count of Hanau-Münzenberg
13. Adriana of Hanau-Munzenberg
27. Adriana of Nassau-Siegen
3. Anna of Solms-Lich
28. Henry IV, Duke of Mecklenburg
14. Magnus II, Duke of Mecklenburg
29. Dorothea of Brandenburg
7. Anna of Mecklenburg-Schwerin
30. Eric II, Duke of Pomerania
15. Sophie of Pomerania
31. Sophie of Pomerania
