= Philip Ernest, Count of Hohenlohe-Langenburg =

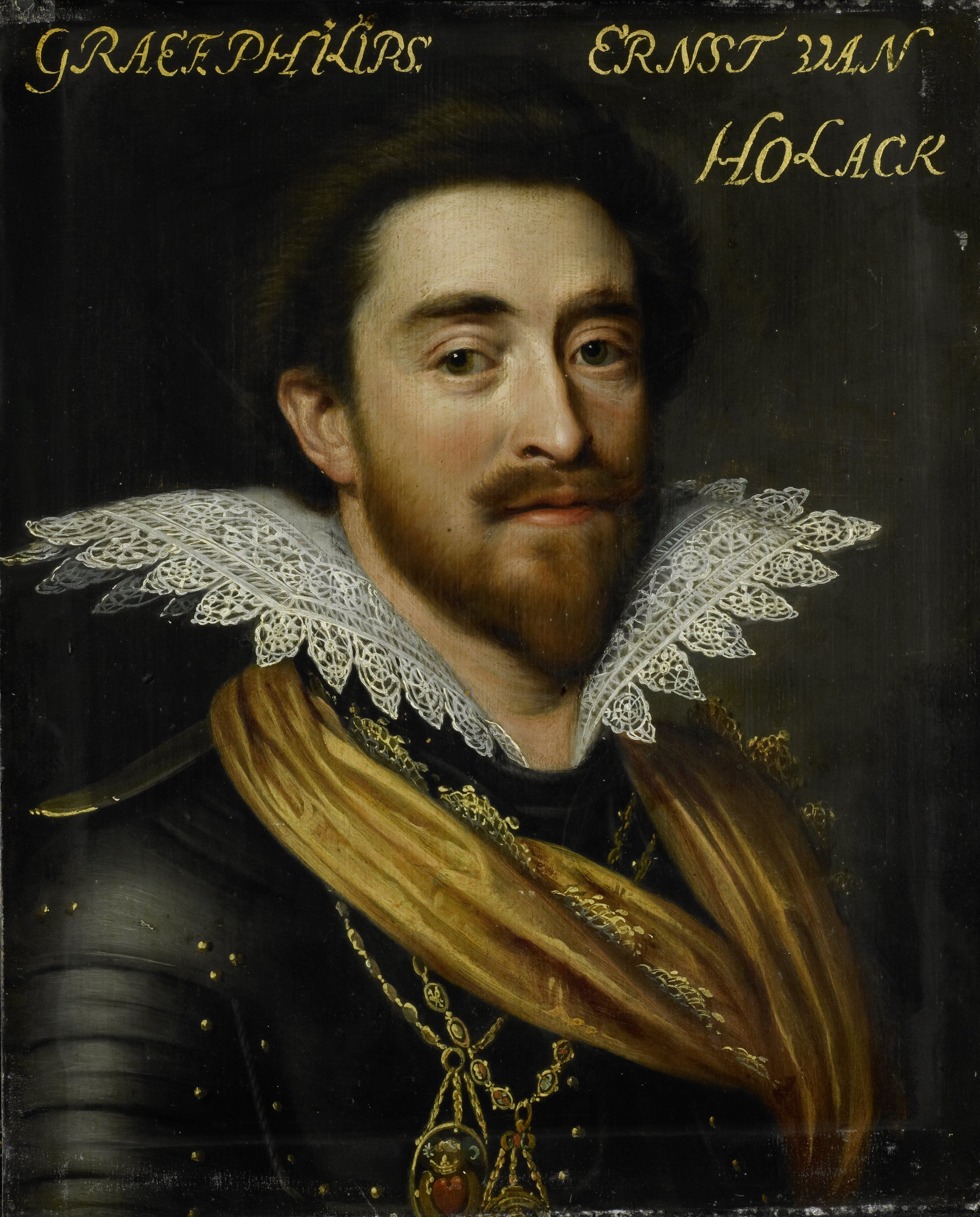
- Born: 11 August 1584; Langenburg
- Died: 29 January 1628 (aged 43); Weikersheim
- Buried: Langenburg
- Noble family: House of Hohenlohe
- Spouse: Anna Maria of Solms-Sonnewalde
- Father: Wolfgang, Count of Hohenlohe-Weikersheim
- Mother: Magdalena of Nassau-Dillenburg

Philip Ernest, Count of Hohenlohe-Langenburg (11 August 1584 in Langenburg – 29 January 1628 in Weikersheim), was Count of Hohenlohe-Langenburg and was the fourth son of Wolfgang, Count of Hohenlohe-Weikersheim (1546–1610), who later became regent of the county of Weikersheim and his wife Magdalena of Nassau-Dillenburg (1547–1643).

He served in the Dutch army until he inherited the Dutch Lordship of Liesvelt from his uncle, Philip of Hohenlohe-Neuenstein. When his father died in 1610, he and his brothers Georg Friedrich (1569–1647) and Kraft (1582–1641) divided the inheritance. Georg Friedrich received Weikersheim; Kraft received Neuenstein and Philip Ernest received the Lordship of Langenburg. He immediately began the construction of Langenburg Castle. Philip Ernest served as a field marshal in the Netherlands. He was eventually relieved of his duties as a colonel by the States-General. He and his wife renovated Langenburg Castle in 1618.

He died in 1628, at the age of 44, in Weikersheim, of a "stone disease". He was buried, together with his wife, in the crypt of the church in Langenburg. A stone monument commemorating the couple can be found behind the altar.

== Marriage and issue ==
On 15 January 1609, he married Countess Anna Maria of Solms-Sonnewalde (1585–1634), the daughter of Count Otto of Solms-Sonnewalde. They had the following children:

- Wolfgang Otto (1611–1632)
- Philip Ernest (1612–1612)
- Louis Kraft (1613–1632)
- Philip Maurice (1614–1635)
- George Frederick (1615–1616)
- Anna Magdalena (1617–1671), married George Louis, Burgrave of Kirchberg, Count of Hachenbach (d. 1686)
- Dorothea (b. 1618)
- Joachim Albert (1619–1675), Count of Hohenlohe-Kirchberg
- Eva Christine (1621–1681), married Count Wolfgang of Hohenlohe-Waldenburg (1617–1658)
- Maria Juliana (1623–1695), married:
  1. John William, Arch-Cupbearer and Count of Limpurg (d. 1655)
  2. Francis, Arch-Cupbearer and Count of Limpurg (d. 1673)
- Henry Frederick (1625–1699), Count of Hohenlohe-Langenburg, married:
  1. in 1652 with Countess Eleonore Magdalene of Hohenlohe-Weikersheim (1635–1657)
  2. in 1658 with Countess Juliana Dorothea of Castell-Remlingen (1640–1706)

Philip Ernest, Count of Hohenlohe-Langenburg House of Hohenlohe Born: 11 August 1584 Died: 29 January 1628
Preceded by Wolfgang	Count of Hohenlohe-Langenburg; 1610–1628	Succeeded by Henry Frederick
