= Henry Frederick, Count of Hohenlohe-Langenburg =

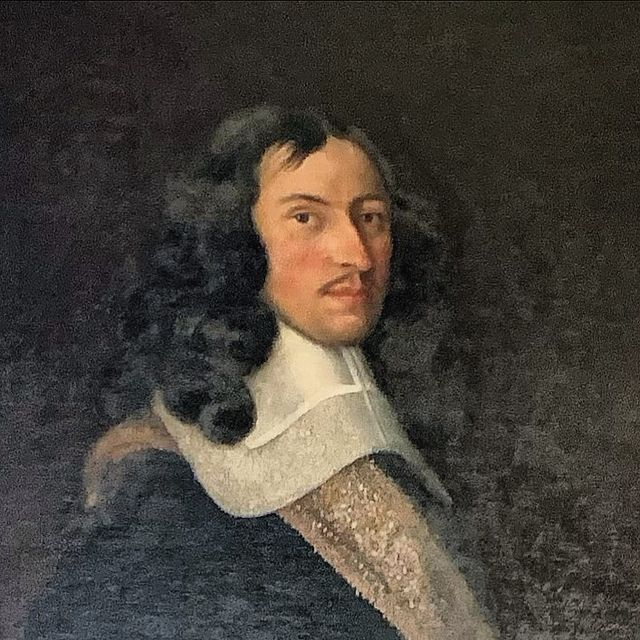
- Born: 7 September 1625; Langenburg
- Died: 2 June 1699 (aged 73); Langenburg
- Noble family: House of Hohenlohe
- Spouses: Countess Eleonore Magdalene of Hohenlohe-Weikersheim; Countess Juliana Dorothea of Castell-Remlingen
- Father: Philip Ernest, Count of Hohenlohe-Langenburg
- Mother: Anna Maria of Solms-Sonnewalde

Henry Frederick, Count of Hohenlohe-Langenburg (7 September 1625 in Langenburg – 2 June 1699 ibid) was the youngest child of Count Philip Ernest of Hohenlohe-Langenburg and his wife Countess Anna Maria of Solms-Sonnewalde.

He was head of the house of Hohenlohe-Langenburg and added the bell tower to the town church of Langenburg, which supports four bells, and still stands today. The count worked hard and successfully to rebuild his county, which suffered badly during the Thirty Years' War. He also managed to reduce the county's public debt.

== Marriage and issue ==
On 25 January 1652 he married Countess Eleonore Magdalene of Hohenlohe-Weikersheim (1635–1657), daughter of his uncle George Frederick of Hohenlohe-Weikersheim (1569–1647). She died in 1657, after only five years of marriage. They had four children:

- Sophia Maria * (* / † 1653)
- Philip Albert * (* / † 1654)
- Maria Magdalena (* / † 1655)
- Ernest Eberhard Frederick (1656–1671)

In 1658, he married Countess Juliana Dorothea zu Castell-Remlingen (1640–1706). They had the following children:

- Albert Wolfgang (1659–1715), married Countess Sophia Amalia of Nassau-Saarbrücken (1666–1736)
- Christina Juliana (* / † 1661)
- Christian Louis (1662–1663)
- Philip Frederick (1664–1666)
- Sophia Christiana Dorothea (* / † 1666)
- Louise Charlotte (1667–1747), married Count Louis Gottfried of Hohenlohe-Waldenburg (1668–1728)
- Christian Kraft (1668–1743), married Countess Maria Katharina of Hohenlohe-Waldenburg (1680–1761). He was the founder of Hohenlohe-Ingelfingen line
- Eleonora Juliana (1669–1730), married Count Johann Ernst of Hohenlohe-Öhringen (1670–1702)
- Mary Magdalene (1670–1671)
- Eberhard Frederick (1672–1737), married firstly, in 1701, Friederike Albertine of Erbach-Fürstenau (1683–1709), and secondly, in 1709, Auguste Sophie of Württemberg (1691–1743). He was the founder of Hohenlohe-Kirchberg line.
- Johanna Sophia (1673–1743), married Count Frederick Christian of Schaumburg-Lippe (1655–1728)
- Maria Christiana (1675–1718), a nun in Gandersheim
- Maurice Louis (1676–1679)
- Augusta Dorothea (1678–1740), married Count Henry XI of Reuss-Schleiz (1669–1726)
- Philippine Henriette (1679–1751), married Count Louis Crato of Nassau-Saarbrücken (1663–1713)
- Ernestine Elizabeth (1680–1721)

Henry Frederick, Count of Hohenlohe-Langenburg House of Hohenlohe Born: 7 September 1625 Died: 2 June 1699
Preceded by Philip Ernest	Count of Hohenlohe-Langenburg; 1628–1699	Succeeded by Albert Wolfgang
