= Magdalena of Nassau-Dillenburg =

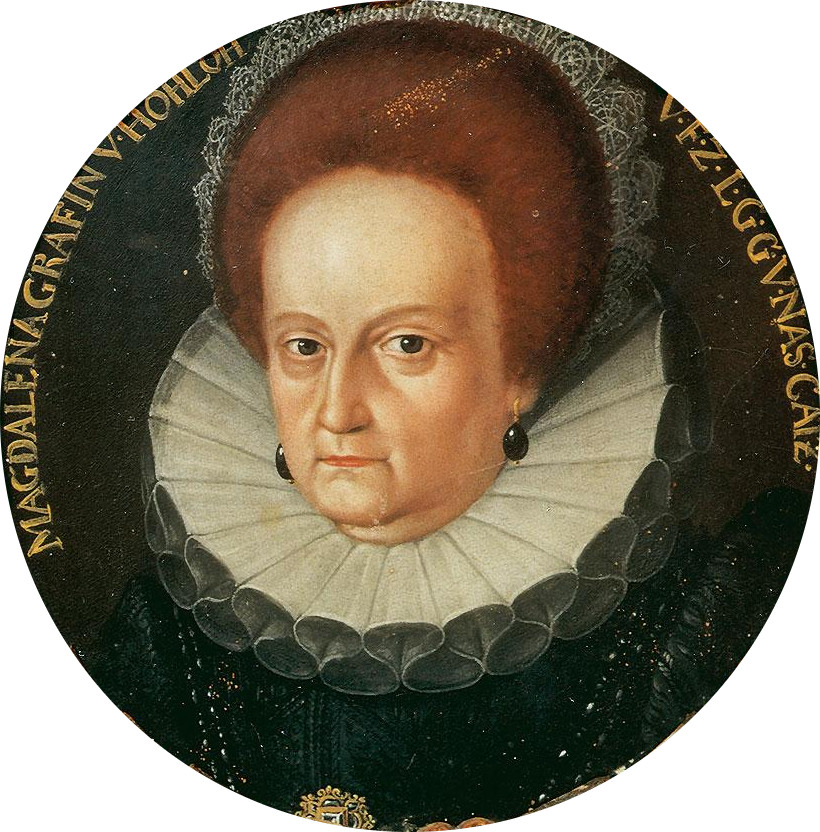
- Born: 15 December 1547; Dillenburg Castle in Dillenburg
- Died: 16 May 1633 (aged 85); Öhringen
- Noble family: House of Nassau
- Spouse: Wolfgang, Count of Hohenlohe-Weikersheim
- Issue: Philip Ernest, Count of Hohenlohe-Langenburg
- Father: William I, Count of Nassau-Siegen
- Mother: Juliana of Stolberg

Magdalena of Nassau-Dillenburg (15 December 1547 at Dillenburg Castle in Dillenburg – 16 May 1633 in Öhringen) was a daughter of William I, Count of Nassau-Siegen and his second wife, Juliana of Stolberg. Magdalena was a sister of William the Silent.

== Life ==
Magdalena spent most of her life at Weikersheim Palace. Her daily routine consisted of organizing court life and her family life. Despite frequent pregnancies, she also worked in the castle's pharmacy, where she gave medicine to the poor, a practice her mother had begun.

She was described as very generous, giving money, food and medicine to the poor and the needy.

She died in Öhringen in 1633.

== Marriage and issue ==
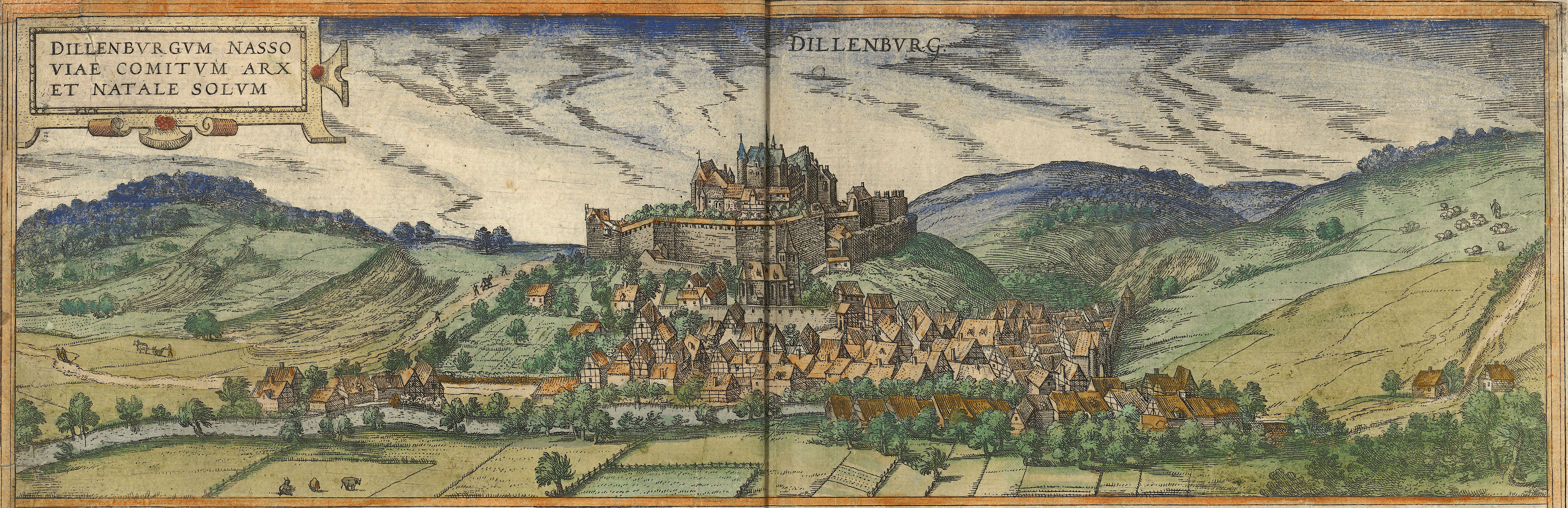
Dillenburg Castle

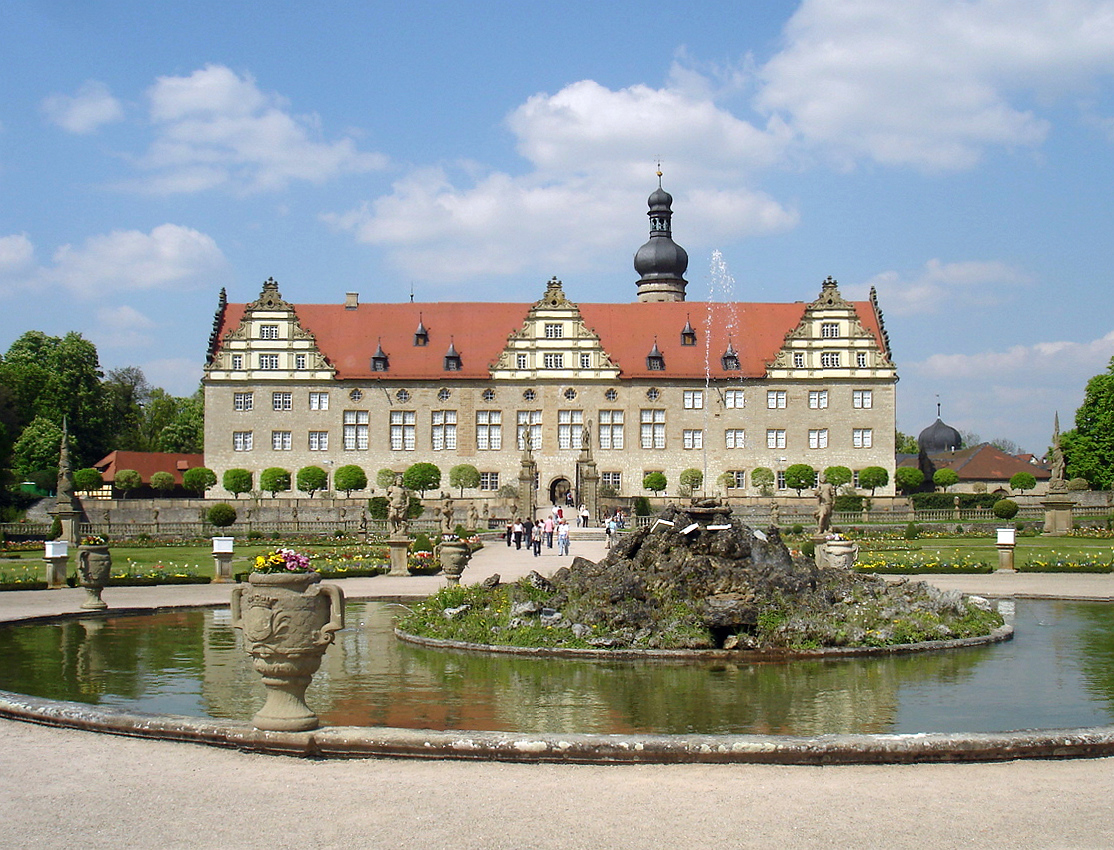
Weikersheim Castle

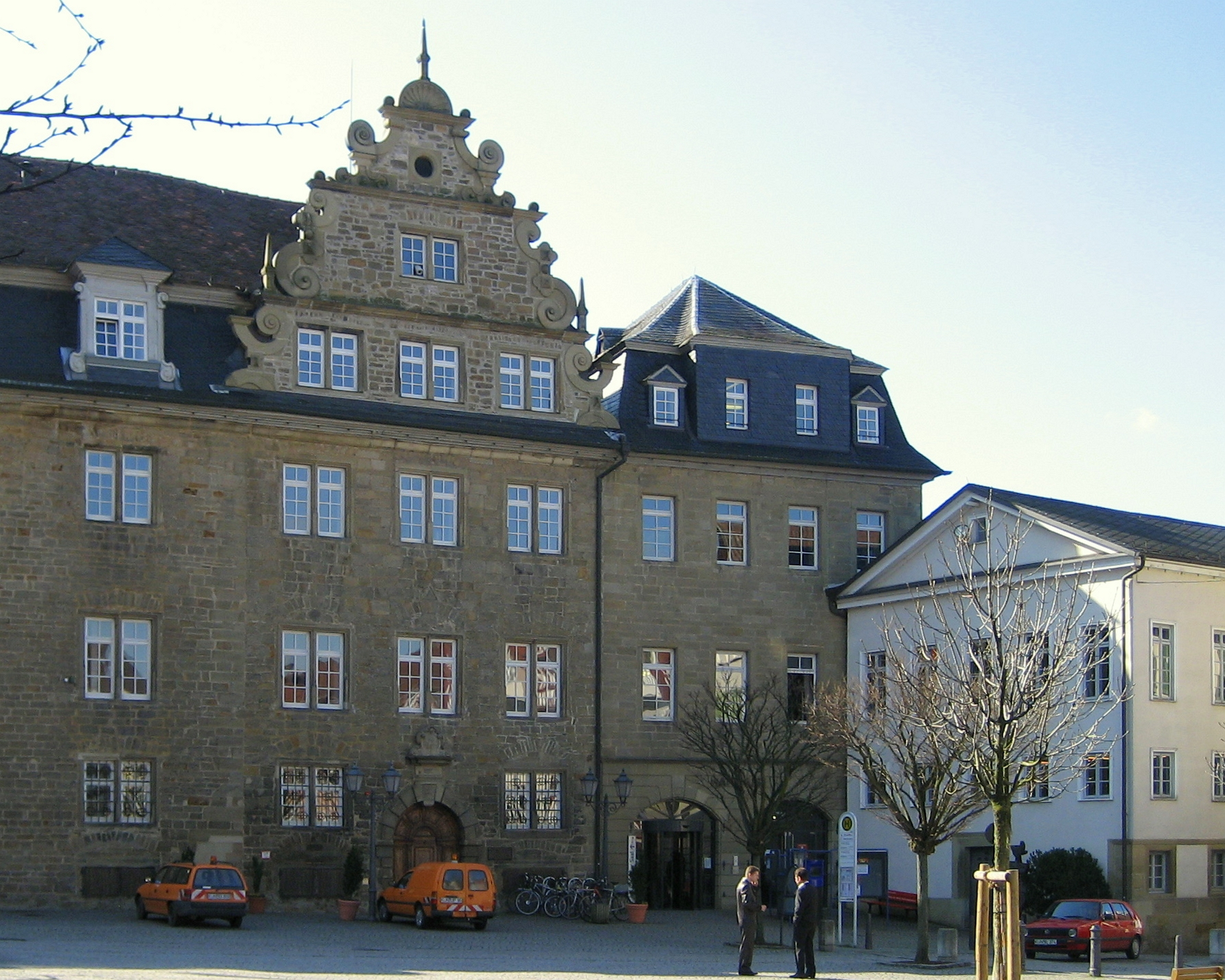
Öhringen Castle

On 27 January 1567 at Dillenburg Castle, she married Count Wolfgang of Hohenlohe-Weikersheim at the age of 19. He was a son of Louis Casimir of Hohenlohe-Waldenburg and Anna of Solms-Lich. They had 15 children, of whom all but one lived to adulthood:

- Catherine (1567–1615)
- Anna Agnes (2 September 1568 – 8 September 1616), married Philip Ernest of Gleichen-Tonna (d. 1619), the Count of Gleichen, Tonna, Spiegelberg and Pyrmont. He was the son of Count George of Gleichen-Tonna (d. 1570) and Countess Walpurga of Spiegelberg (d. 1599)
- George Frederick (5 September 1569 – 7 July 1645)
- Juliana (23 July 1571 – 8 March 1634), married Wolfgang II of Castell-Remlingen
- Magdalena (27 December 1572 – 2 April 1596), married Count Henry I of Reuss-Gera (10 June 1572 in Gera – 13 December 1635 in Gera). He was the son of Count Henry XVI of Reuss-Gera (1530–1572) and his second wife Dorothea of Solms-Sonnewalde (1547–1595)
- Praxedis (1 May 1574 – 15 August 1633)
- Marta (29 April 1575 – 19 December 1632), married John Casimir of Leiningen-Westerburg (d. 1635)
- Maria Elisabeth (12 June 1576 – 31 January 1605), married Johann Reinhard I, Count of Hanau-Lichtenberg (13 February 1569 in Bitche – 19 November 1625 in Lichtenberg). He was the son of Philip V, Count of Hanau-Lichtenberg and Ludowika Margaretha of Zweibrücken-Bitsch (19 July 1540 in Ingweiler – 15 December 1569 in Buchsweiler)
- Louis Casimir (4 February 1578 – 16 September 1604)
- Catherine Joanna (6 July 1579 – 28 November 1615)
- Crato VII (14 November 1582 – 11 October 1641), he married Countess Palatine Sophia of Zweibrücken-Birkenfeld, the daughter of Charles I, Count Palatine of Zweibrücken-Birkenfeld and Dorothea of Brunswick-Lüneburg
- Philip Ernest (11 August 1584 – 29 January 1628), twin of Wolfgang Ernest, married Anna Maria of Solms-Sonnewalde (14 January 1585 in Sonnewalde – 20 November 1634 in Ottweiler). She was a daughter of Otto of Solms-Sonnewalde (25 June 1550 in Sonnewalde – 29 January 1612 in Sonnewalde) and Anna Amalia of Nassau-Weilburg (12 October 1560 in Weilburg – 6 January 1635 in Estrasburgo). Anna Amalia was the eldest daughter of Albert, Count of Nassau-Weilburg.
- Wolfgang Ernest (11 August 1584 – 29 January 1588), twin of Philip Ernest, died in early childhood
- Albert (30 December 1585 – 21 October 1605)
- Dorothea Walburga (20 September 1590 – 20 September 1656), married Philip Henry of Hohenlohe-Waldenburg (3 June 1591 in Waldenburg – 22 March 1644), who was Count of Hohenlohe-Waldenburg from 1615 until his death. He was a son of George Frederick I of Hohenlohe-Waldenburg (1562–1660) and Dorothea Reuss of Plauen (1570–1631)
