= Ludwigsruhe =

Coordinates: 49.26173°N 9.8928°E

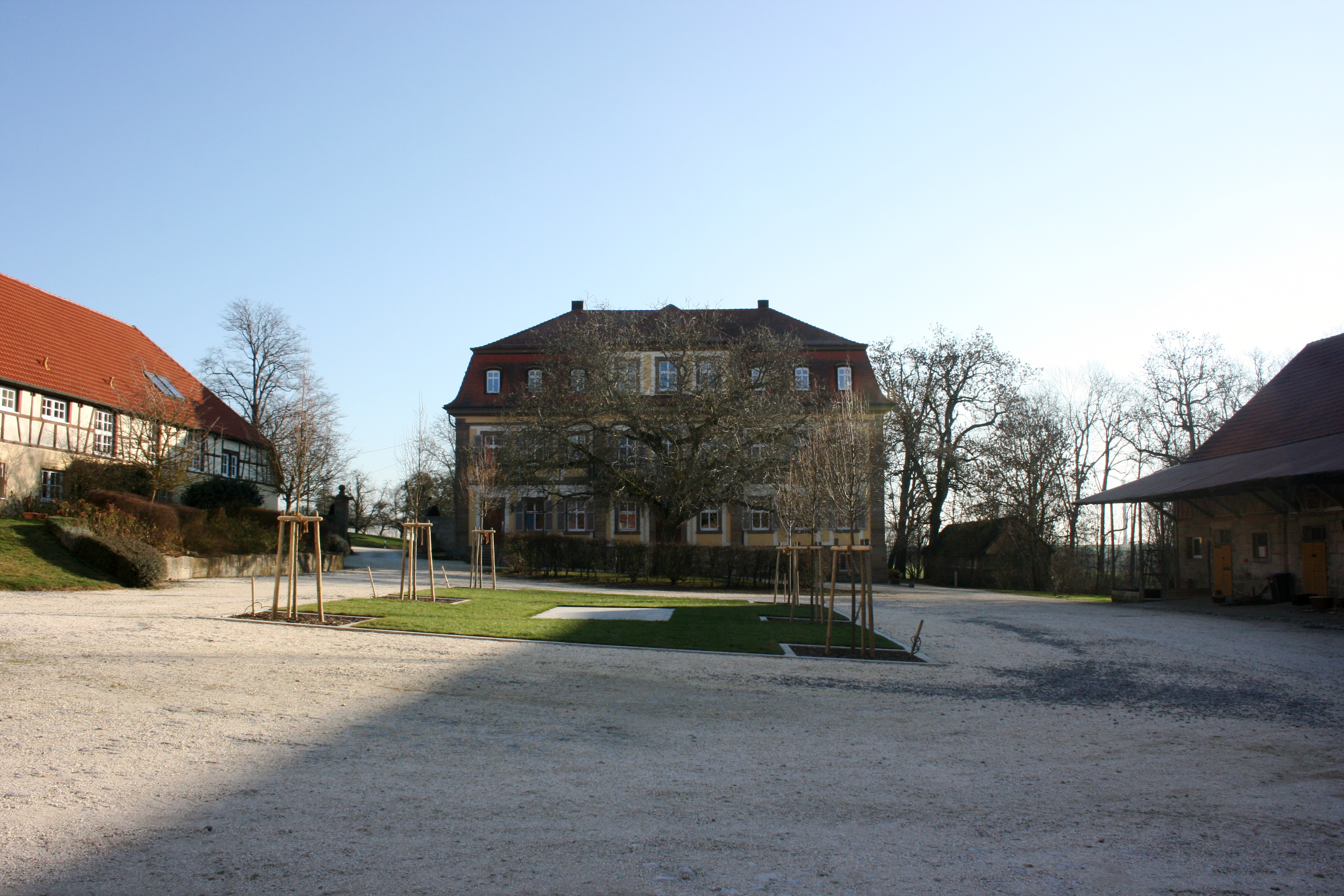
The château in Ludwigsruhe

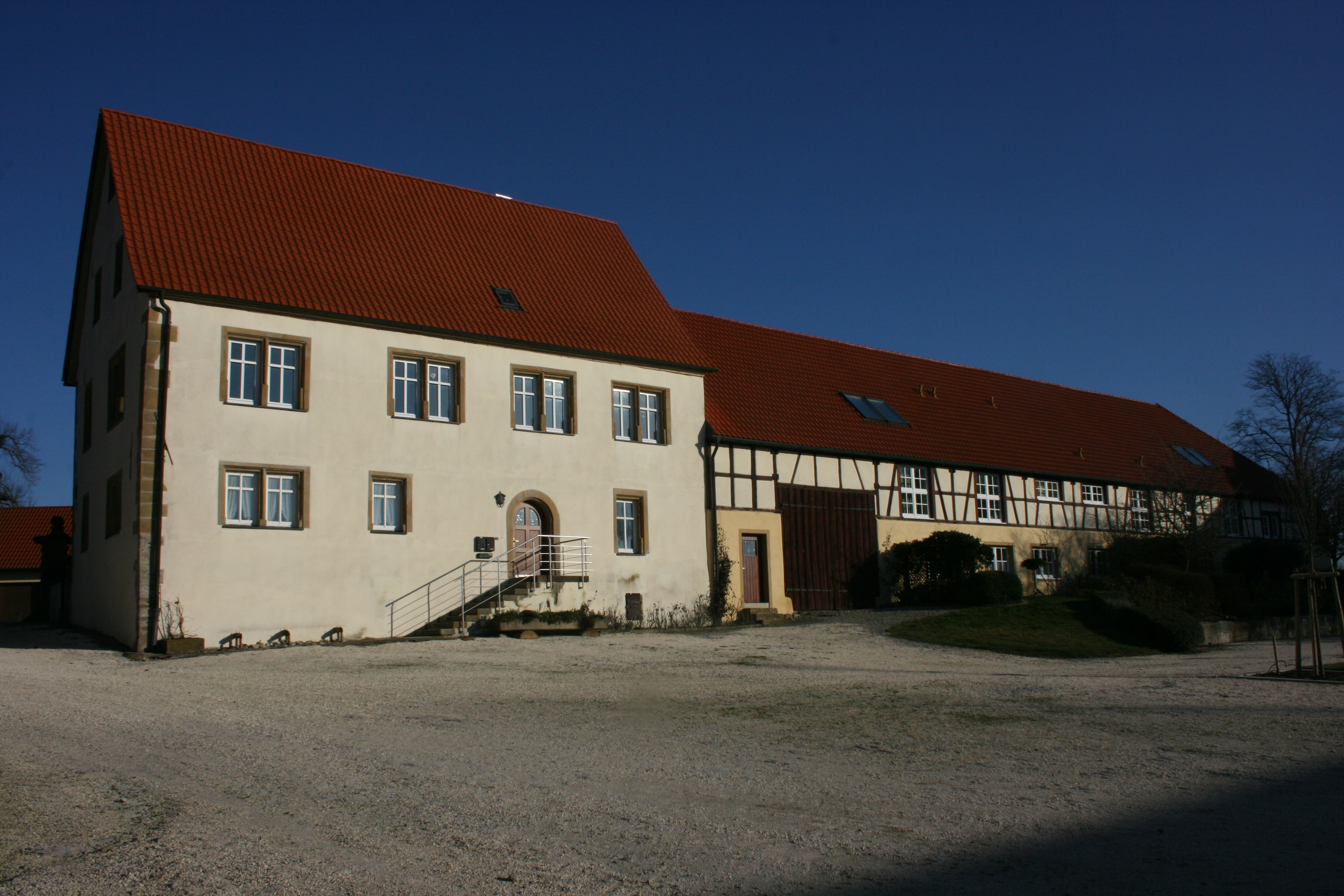
Farm buildings

Ludwigsruhe is a hamlet in Hohenlohe. It is a suburb of the town of Langenburg in the district of Schwäbisch Hall, located in Baden-Württemberg, Germany. Until 11 August 1761, the place was called Lindenbronn. Prince Louis of Hohenlohe-Langenburg then changed the name of the hamlet to match the name of the lustschloss he had built there.

== History ==
The hamlet of Lindenbronn was acquired by the Hohenlohe-Langenburg family in 1556. In the years that followed, they created a 28-acre park to hunt. In 1750, the park was surrounded by a wall.

In 1736, Prince Louis began building a summer residence in the park. It was designed by Leopoldo Retti, and Retti's original design was based on early 18th century Parisian city architecture. Prince Louis only built a simplified version of the original design.

On the ground floor were some utility rooms, a garden room and a dining room. The first floor contained a large hall and three residential apartments. This is typical for a lustschloss, a type of château which was also invented in France. In the façade of the Ludwigsruhe château, we see a mix of architecture from the court at Ansbach, windows arranged like the palace in Ludwigsburg and "eared" window frames of unknown origin. Construction of the château was completed in 1743.

In the 19th century, a dairy farm was attached to the manor. The park and the château have been privately owned since 1980, and they can be rented for events.
