= Georg Friedrich of Hohenlohe-Neuenstein-Weikersheim =

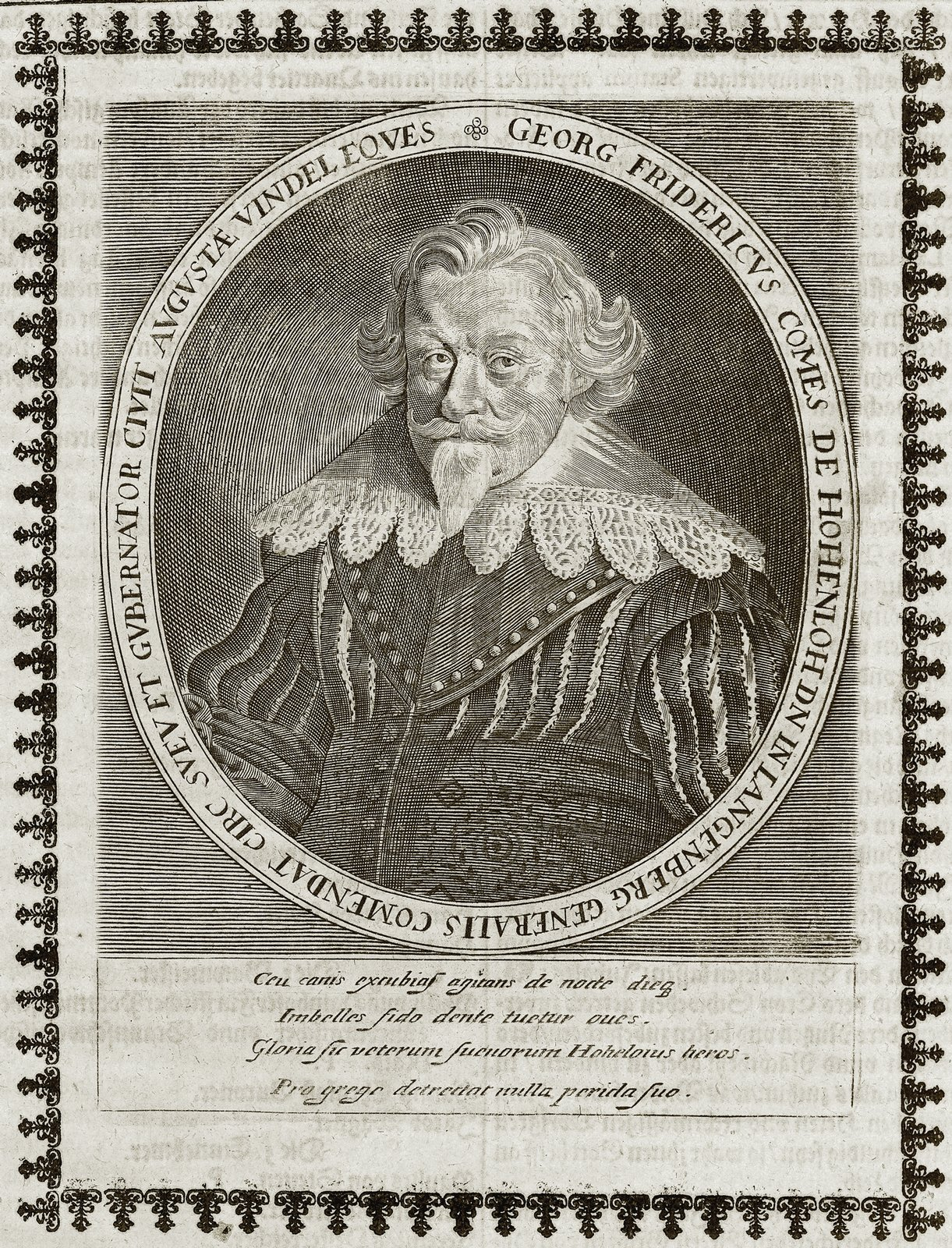
Georg Friedrich of Hohenlohe-Neuenstein-Weikersheim.

Count Georg Friedrich von Hohenlohe-Neuenstein-Weikersheim (September 5, 1569 – July 7, 1645) was an officer and an amateur poet.

== Biography ==
Born in Neuenstein, Georg Friedrich was the son of Wolfgang, Count of Hohenlohe-Weikersheim and his wife Magdalena of Nassau-Dillenburg.

At the age of 17, in 1586 Count Georg Friedrich went to the University of Geneva and studied there until 1588. He was probably the last student of Professor François Hotman. Subsequently, for the purpose of study, Count Georg Friedrich went to France and later to Italy, where he enrolled at the universities of Siena and Padua.

After finishing his studies, in 1591 he fought under Henry IV of France against the Catholic League. In the war against the Turks in 1595, he was promoted to colonel. In 1605, as imperial field commander, he put down an uprising in Hungary.

On June 18, 1607, Friedrich married Eva von Waldstein. Through this marriage he became a member of the Bohemian Estates and thereby also became involved in the resistance against King (Holy Roman Emperor) Ferdinand II. As General commander of the Estates, he was responsible for organization and in the Battle of White Mountain he commanded a cavalry unit.

On January 22, 1621, he was accepted as a member of the Fruchtbringende Gesellschaft by Prince Ludwig I of Anhalt-Köthen.

In 1621, Emperor Ferdinand II proclaimed Frederick V of the Palatinate and others to be traitors. The others included Georg Friedrich of Hohenlohe-Neuenstein-Weikersheim.

In spite of having fallen under the proclamation of imperial banishment in 1621, Count Georg Friedrich was able to achieve peace with the emperor and with imperial approval was even able to exercise his lordship in Weikersheim, which had fallen to him at the death of his father in 1610.

His wife Eva died May 24, 1631. On August 17, 1633, he married Maria Magdalena von Oettingen-Oettingen, who however died on May 29, 1636, after a barely three-year-long marriage.

In 1632, Count Georg Friedrich was installed as the Swedish regent of the Swabian Circle. When he accepted this post, he infuriated the emperor to the point that he immediately outlawed him again. Additionally, the Teutonic Order immediately, by imperial decree, received the lordship of Weikersheim. This was only returned to the House of Hohenlohe after the Peace of Westphalia in 1648.

Due to his outlawry, Georg Friedrich was excluded from the Peace of Prague [1635]. Nevertheless, during a personal conversation in 1637, the emperor forgave him. Count Georg Friedrich settled in Langenburg and avoided every form of political activity. Here in Langenburg he was also active in literature. He wrote primarily prayers and poems.

Count Georg Friedrich of Hohenlohe-Neuenstein-Weikersheim died on August 7, 1645, at the age of 76 years, in Langenburg.

== Works ==
- Geistliche Psalmen und Kirchengesänge ("Spiritual Psalms and Church Songs", 1648)
