= Pfedelbach =

- Municipality
- Coat of arms

- Location of Pfedelbach within Hohenlohekreis district
- Interactive map of Pfedelbach
- Location within Germany Location within Baden-Württemberg
- Coordinates: 49°11′N 9°30′E
- Country: Germany
- State: Baden-Württemberg
- Admin. region: Stuttgart
- District: Hohenlohekreis
- Subdivisions: 6

Government
  - Mayor (2018–26): Torsten Kunkel (CDU)

Area
  - Total: 41.29 km^{2} (15.94 sq mi)
- Elevation: 240 m (790 ft)

Population (2025-12-31)
  - Total: 9,300
  - Density: 230/km^{2} (580/sq mi)
- Time zone: UTC+01:00 (CET)
  - Summer (DST): UTC+02:00 (CEST)
- Postal codes: 74629
- Dialling codes: 07941
- Vehicle registration: KÜN, ÖHR
- Website: www.pfedelbach.de

Pfedelbach (German pronunciation: [ˈpfeːdl̩bax]) is a municipality in the district of Hohenlohe in Baden-Württemberg in Germany.

In 1472 the town and castle were bought by the counts of Hohenlohe. The present castle was built from 1568 to 1572 by the count of Hohenlohe-Waldenburg. Being regionally most popular for its Fürstenfass (Prince's barrel), Pfedelbach's history dates back to the 11th century.

Nowadays most of the surrounding smaller townships have been suburbanized to Pfedelbach, including Oberohrn, Heuberg/Buchhorn/Gleichen (three small villages counting as one), Harsberg, Untersteinbach and Windischenbach to name but a few.

A special aspect about the early culture of Pfedelbach is the affiliation to the Yenish language.

== Local council (Gemeinderat) ==
Elections were held in May 2014:

FWV	56,2 %	13 Seats
CDU/FW	43,8 %	10 Seats
