= Mediatization =

Mediatization or mediatisation may refer to:

- German mediatisation, German historical territorial restructuring
- Mediatization (media), the influence and interaction of mass media with other sectors of society
