= Brauneck =

Coordinates: 47°40′N 11°31′E

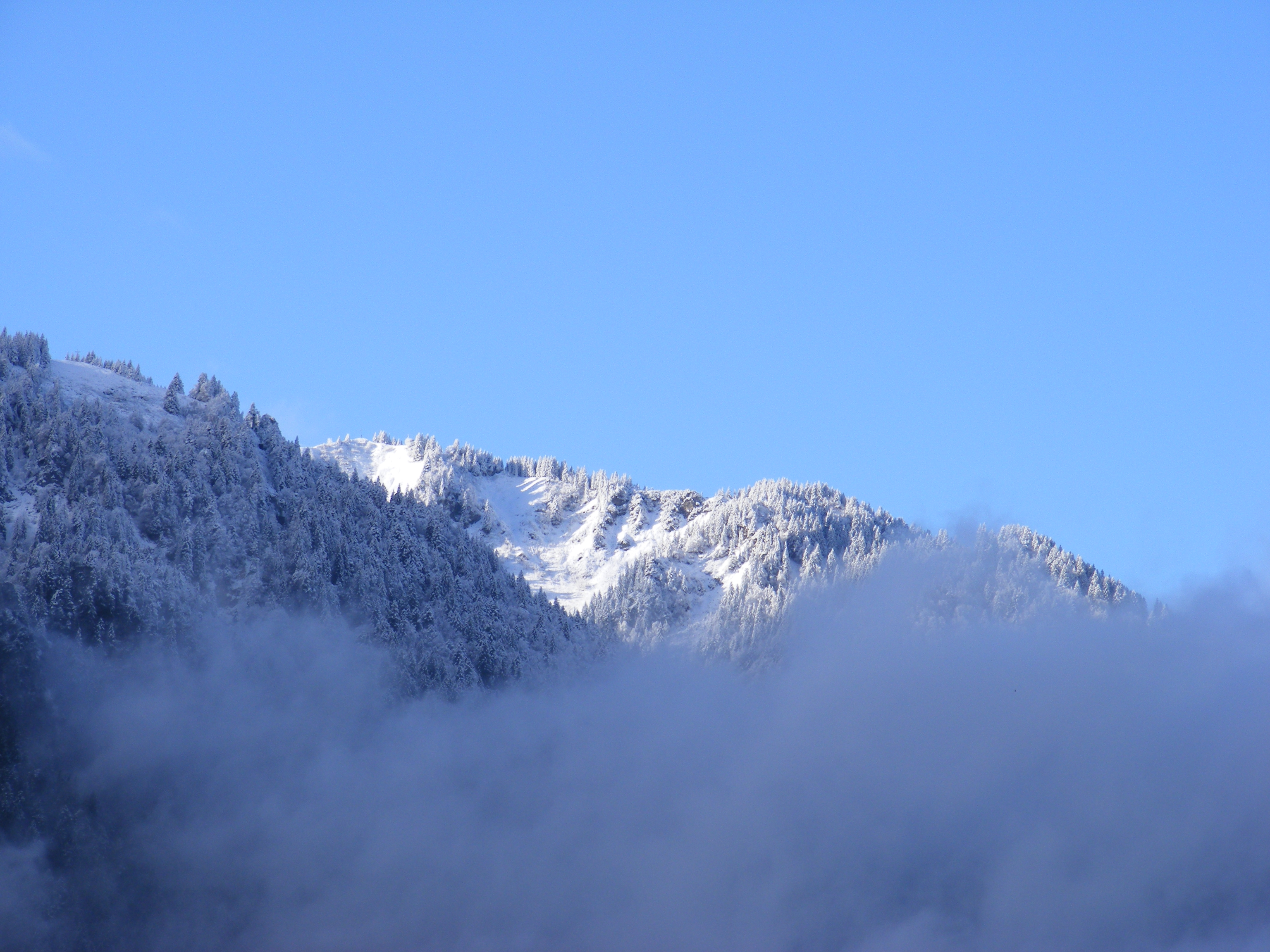

Highest point
- Elevation: 1,555 m (5,102 ft)

Geography
- Location: Bavaria, Germany

Brauneck is a mountain in Bavaria, Germany. It is the 'house mountain' of Lenggries.

The mountain is a popular local skiing destination.
