= Albert Wolfgang, Count of Hohenlohe-Langenburg =

- Born: 6 July 1659; Langenburg
- Died: 17 April 1715 (aged 55); Langenburg
- Noble family: House of Hohenlohe
- Spouse: Countess Sophia Amalia of Nassau-Saarbrücken
- Father: Henry Frederick, Count of Hohenlohe-Langenburg
- Mother: Countess Juliana Dorothea of Castell-Remlingen

Albert Wolfgang, Count of Hohenlohe-Langenburg (6 July 1659 in Langenburg – 17 April 1715 in Langenburg) was the ruling Count of Hohenlohe-Langenburg.

== Early life and ancestry ==
Born into the House of Hohenlohe, he was the oldest child of Count Henry Frederick of Hohenlohe-Langenburg (1625–1699) and his second wife, Countess Juliana Dorothea of Castell-Remlingen (1640–1706).

== Biography ==
He was head of the House of Hohenlohe-Langenburg and introduced primogeniture in Langenburg in 1699. This meant the oldest son would inherit the entire county, and younger sons would only inherit if the oldest were to die childless. From then on, younger sons would mostly embark on military careers, for example, in the imperial army, or in friendly nations.

== Marriage and issue ==
On 22 August 1686 he married Countess Sophia Amalia of Nassau-Saarbrücken (1666–1736), the daughter of Count Gustav Adolf of Nassau-Saarbrücken. They had the following children:

- Eleonora Juliana (1687–1701)
- Frederick Louis (1688-1688)
- Sophie Charlotte (1690–1691)
- Philip (1692–1699)
- Christiana (1693–1695)
- Louis (1696–1765), married Countess Eleonore of Nassau-Saarbrücken (1707–1769)
- Charlotte (1697–1743)
- Christian (1699–1719)
- Albertina (1701–1773), married Prince Philip Henry of Hohenlohe-Ingelfingen (1702–1781)
- Sophie Friederike (1702–1734)
- Henrietta (1704–1709)
- Charles Frederick (1706–1718)

Albert Wolfgang, Count of Hohenlohe-Langenburg House of Hohenlohe Born: 6 July 1659 Died: 17 April 1715
Preceded by Henry Frederick	Count of Hohenlohe-Langenburg; 1699-1715	Succeeded by Louis as Prince of Hohenlohe-Langenburg
