= Anna Maria of Solms-Sonnewalde =

- Born: 24 January 1585; Sonnewalde
- Died: 20 November 1634 (aged 49); Ottweiler
- Buried: Langenburg
- Noble family: Solms-Sonnewalde
- Spouse: Philip Ernest, Count of Hohenlohe-Langenburg
- Father: Otto of Solms-Sonnewalde
- Mother: Anna Amalia of Nassau-Weilburg

Anna Maria, Countess of Solms-Sonnewalde (24 January 1585 in Sonnewalde – 20 November 1634 in Ottweiler) was Countess of Solms-Sonnewalde by birth and by marriage Countess of Hohenlohe-Langenburg.

== Life ==
Anna Maria was born as the third daughter of Count Otto of Solms-Sonnewalde (1550-1612), and his wife, Countess Anna of Nassau-Weilburg, (1560-1635), the eldest daughter of Albert, Count of Nassau-Weilburg.

On 15 January 1609, she married Count Philip Ernest of Hohenlohe-Langenburg (1584-1628), the son of Count Wolfgang of Hohenlohe-Neuenstein. When they renovated Langenburg Castle in 1618, Anna Maria's coat of arms was placed beside her husband's in the great hall.

Amid the turmoil of the Thirty Years' War, the widow Anna Maria and took over the reins of government. In September 1634, she fled just in time with her mother and her children and an escort of 200 cavalry provided by the Count Palatine of the Rhine. She fled to Saarbrücken and then to Ottweiler, her mother's home town.

She died in Ottweiler on 20 November 1634 and was buried next to her husband in the city church of Langenburg. A stone monument commemorating the couple still stands behind the altar.

== Issue ==
From her marriage to Count Philip Ernest, she had the following children:

- Wolfgang Otto (1611-1632)
- Philip Ernest (1612-1612)
- Louis Crato (1613-1632)
- Philip Maurice (1614-1635)
- George Frederick (1615-1616)
- Anna Magdalena (1617-1671), married George Louis, Burgrave of Kirchberg, Count of Hachenbach (d. 1686)
- Dorothea (b. 1618)
- Joachim Albert (1619-1675), Count of Hohenlohe-Kirchberg
- Eva Christine (1621-1681), married Count Wolfgang of Hohenlohe-Waldenburg (1617-1658)
- Maria Juliana (1623-1695), married:
  1. in 1647 to John William, Arch-Cupbearer and Count of Limpurg (d. 1655)
  2. in 1663 to Francis, Arch-Cupbearer and Count of Limpurg (d. 1673)
- Henry Frederick (1625-1699), married:
  1. in 1652 to with Countess Eleonore Magdalene of Hohenlohe-Weikersheim (1635-1657)
  2. in 1658 to Countess Juliana Dorothea of Castell-Remlingen (1640-1706)

== Sources ==
- Strack, Doris (2008). "Die Kalkschneidearbeiten der Brüder Kuhn in Schloss Langenburg (1618 und 1627)". Württembergische Franken (in German). 92: 143–180. doi:10.53458/wfr.v92i.4546.
