= Johann Friedrich II of Hohenlohe-Öhringen =

German noble

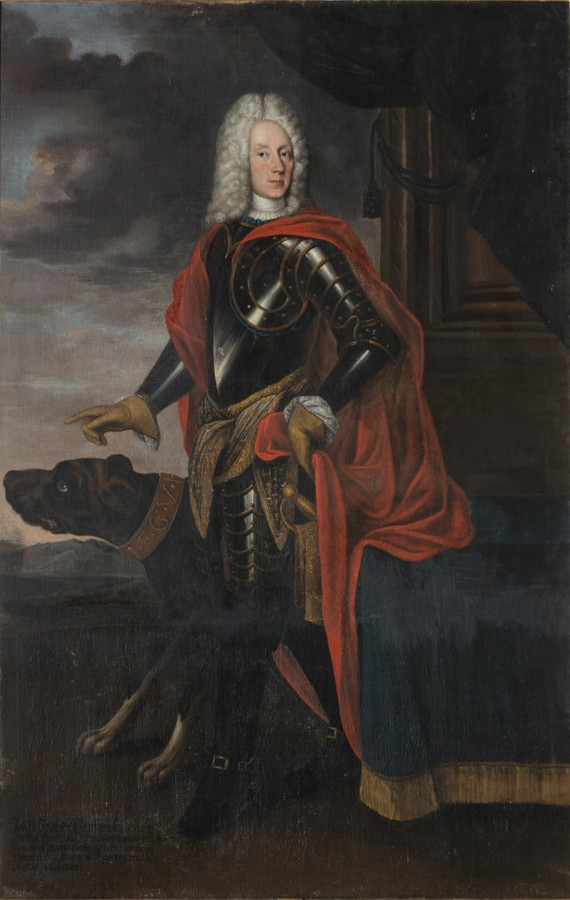
Count Johann Friedrich II of Hohenlohe-Neuenstein-Öhringen, prince since 1764, painting by Peter Franz Tassaert in the knight's hall of the castle in Weikersheim.

Johann Friedrich II (1683–1764) was a ruler of the principality of Hohenlohe-Öhringen from 1708 to 1764 and prince from 1764.

== Life ==
Johann Friedrich II was the fourth son of Count Johann Friedrich I of Hohenlohe-Öhringen (born July 31, 1617, in Neuenstein; † October 17, 1702, in Öhringen), and his wife Luise Amöne, née Princess of Schleswig-Holstein-Norburg (* January 15, 1642, at Norburg Castle; † June 11, 1685, in Öhringen), daughter of Duke Friedrich of Schleswig-Holstein-Sonderburg-Norburg. [3] As a descendant of the Neuenstein line of his house (grandson of Kraft zu Hohenlohe-Neuenstein and great-grandson of Wolfgang II von Hohenlohe ), He traditionally belonged to the Protestant denomination.

At the age of 19 he attended the Knights' Academy in Copenhagen.

The older brother Friedrich Kraft (1667–1709) was deemed unfit to rule by his father due to mental and physical disabilities. The ruling counts of the Hohenlohe-Langenburg and Waldenburg lines insisted that the sick Count Friedrich Kraft should not be excluded from the succession from the outset, but that a decision on the division had to be made for five years to determine whether Count Friedrich Kraft's health would improve to such an extent that a division of the Neuenstein-Öhringer line into three territories would be possible.

Since the older brother Friedrich Kraft was unable to govern even after a five-year wait, the inheritance was divided between Count Carl Ludwig and his younger brother Johann Friedrich II by drawing lots on May 30, 1708. Count Johann Friedrich II received the rule of Öhringen with Neuenstein.

== Marriage and life ==
On February 13 1710, Count Johann Friedrich II married Landgravine Dorothea Sophia of Hesse-Darmstadt, daughter of Landgrave Ernst Ludwig (1667–1739), in Darmstadt. The couple had seven children:

1. Ludwig Wilhelm Friedrich (*/† 1712)

2. Charlotte Luise Friederike (* June 10, 1713; † October 30, 1785)

3. Karoline Sophie (* January 8, 1715; † August 21, 1770)

4. Wilhelmine Eleonore (* February 20, 1717; † June 30, 1794)

5. Leopoldine Antoinette (* March 16, 1718; † October 4, 1779)

6. Eleonore Christiane (* March 1, 1720 – † February 17, 1746)

7. Ludwig Friedrich Karl (1723–1805), Prince of Hohenlohe-Neuenstein-Ohringen.

When his brother, Count Carl Ludwig, died in 1756, the Weikersheim residence and its territory reverted to him, the younger and only remaining brother. In 1764, Count Johann Friedrich II was elevated to the rank of prince.
