= Langenburg =

- Town
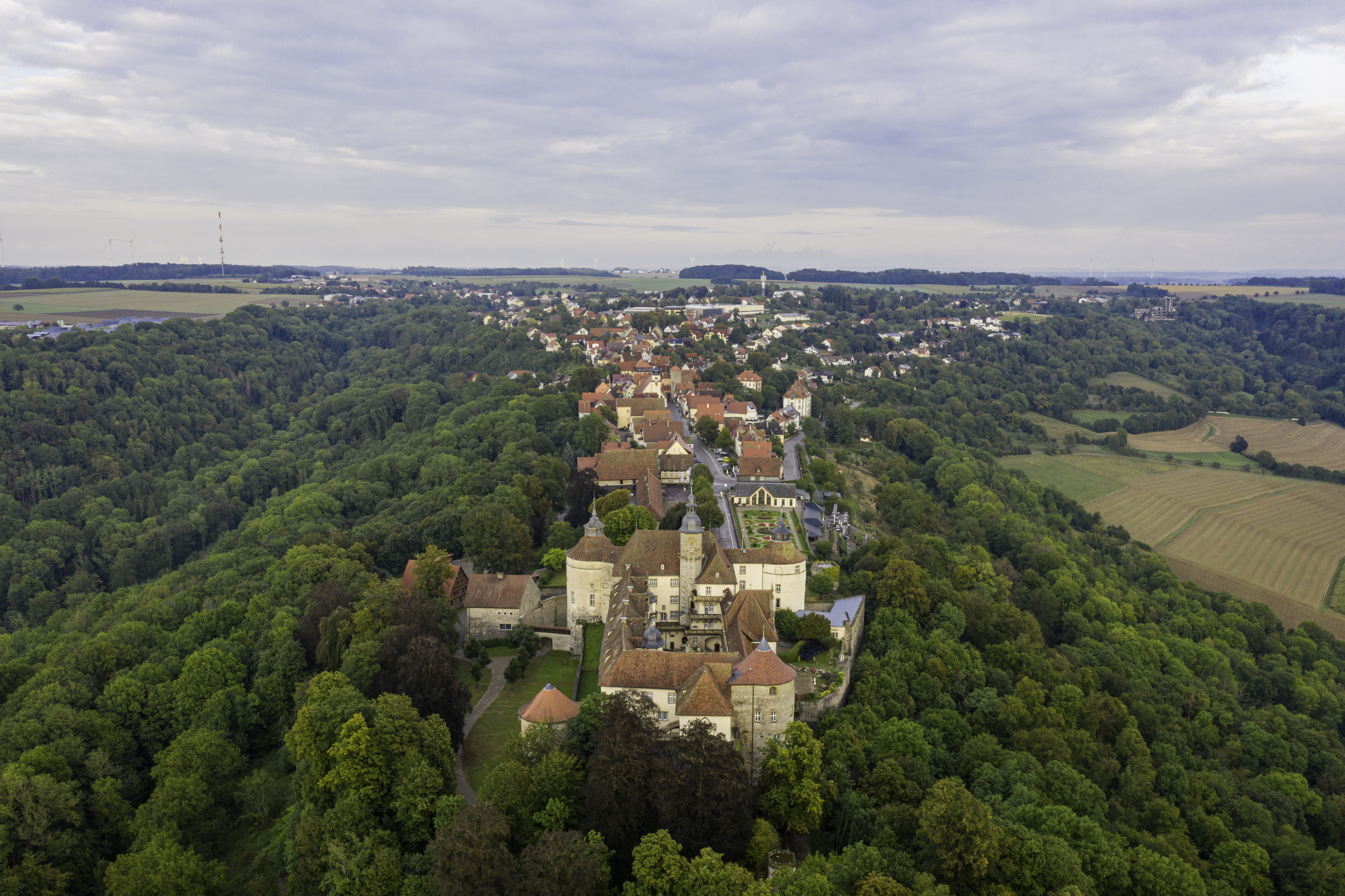
- Langenburg with the Langenburg Castle in the foreground

- Coat of arms

- Location of Langenburg within Schwäbisch Hall district
- Interactive map of Langenburg
- Location within Germany Location within Baden-Württemberg
- Coordinates: 49°15′12″N 09°50′55″E
- Country: Germany
- State: Baden-Württemberg
- Admin. region: Stuttgart
- District: Schwäbisch Hall

Government
  - Mayor (2023–31): Petra Weber

Area
  - Total: 31.4 km^{2} (12.1 sq mi)
- Elevation: 439 m (1,440 ft)

Population (2025-12-31)
  - Total: 1,751
  - Density: 55.8/km^{2} (144/sq mi)
- Time zone: UTC+01:00 (CET)
  - Summer (DST): UTC+02:00 (CEST)
- Postal codes: 74595
- Dialling codes: 07905
- Vehicle registration: SHA
- Website: www.langenburg.de

Langenburg (German pronunciation: [ˈlaŋənˌbʊʁk]) is a town in the district of Schwäbisch Hall, in Baden-Württemberg, Germany. It is located on a hill above the river Jagst, 18 km northeast of Schwäbisch Hall. It is also the place where Wibele - small, sweet, biscuit-like pastries - were invented and are still baked today.

== History ==
=== Early history ===
A prehistoric settlement on the ridge on which Langenburg is situated is considered likely, but has not been proven. From 500 BC onwards, Celts moved into the region and constructed Viereckschanzen, including a site two kilometres east of the present-day urban area. Based on finds of fragments from bowls with inward-curving rims, pots with comb-stroke decoration, and remains of a graphite-clay vessel, this enclosure is dated to the Late Celtic La Tène period. It is presumed that it may have been a manorial estate with central functions of power, worship, and justice. In the present-day district of Unterregenbach, located three kilometres to the north in the Jagst valley, the remains of a noble residence with a residential tower can be seen.

The history of the town of Langenburg begins with the establishment of a hill castle on a westward-projecting mountain spur known as the Langenberg. It is presumed that a family of free nobles moved its seat from Unterregenbach to the more strategically advantageous location even before 1200. Subsequently, the family took its name from its seat. Langenburg Castle and town were first mentioned in 1226 as Langenberg Castrum et oppidum in a document issued by the Bishop of Würzburg. At this time, there were probably only a few houses outside the castle, whose inhabitants had settled there to supply the lord of the castle. There was no church in the settlement, and until 1556 Langenburg belonged to the parish of Bächlingen. The settlement was fortified by a Haag (garden fence, hedge), consisting of sturdy tree branches, bundles of brushwood, and poles.

The free lords of Langenburg, who entered recorded history in 1201 but became extinct as early as 1253, had a close, probably familial relationship with the Lords of Hohenlohe. Following the extinction of the Langenburg line, the Hohenlohe family inherited their possessions. Thus, the settlement came under Hohenlohe rule and shared the fate of the principality in the following centuries. As in other Hohenlohe administrative centres, a limited form of municipal self-government also developed here. Between 1499 and 1502, Count Kraft VI of Hohenlohe had the master builder Hanns Schramm construct the first house of worship in Langenburg, the Chapel of the Holy Blood, which formed the nucleus of the present-day church. However, Bächlingen remained the seat of the parish.

In December 1507, shootings in Langenburg were reported, which have been associated with Konrad Schott von Schottenstein.

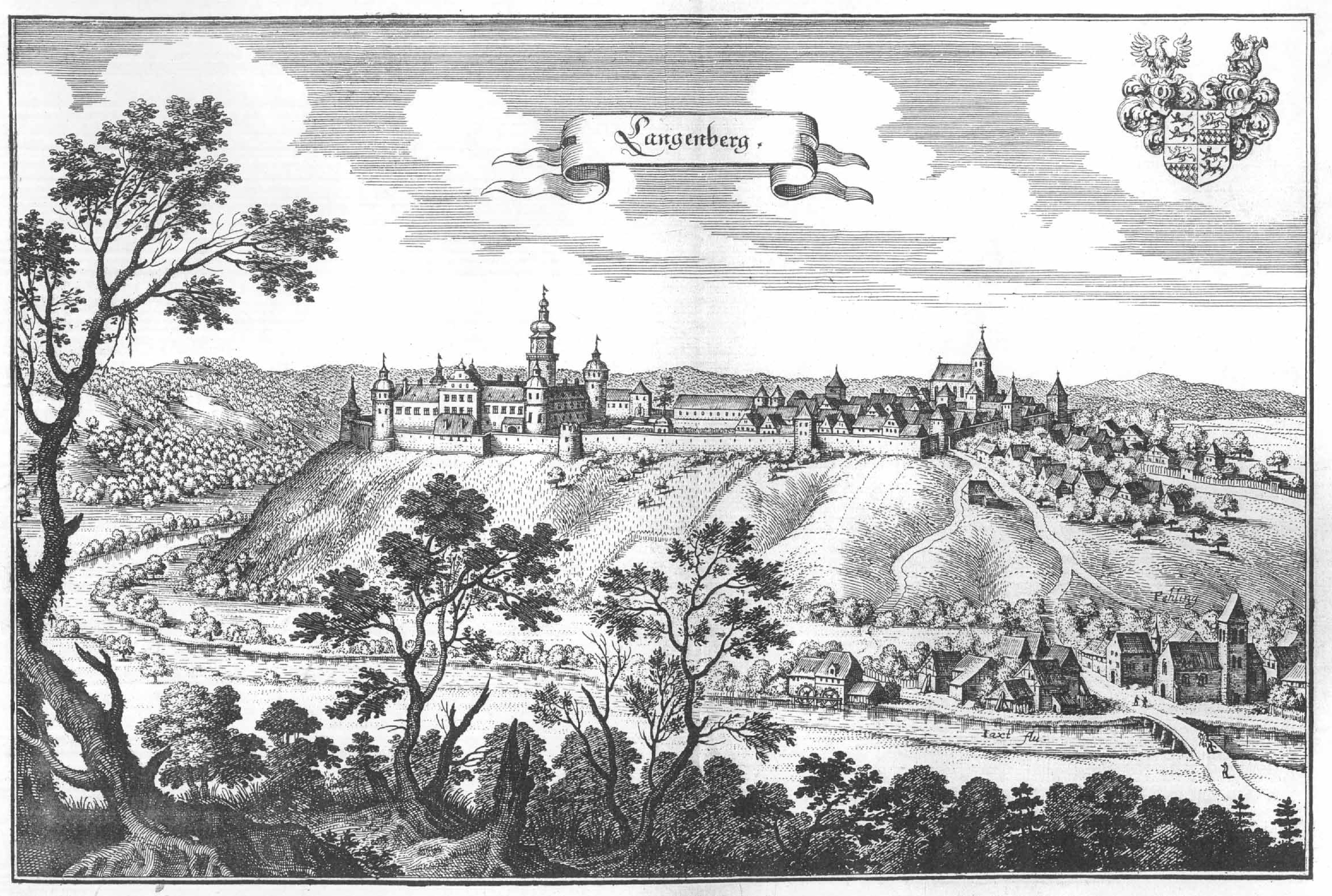
Langenburg, copper engraving by Matthäus Merian around 1650

In 1568, Langenburg became the residence town of the County and later Principality of Hohenlohe-Langenburg when Count Wolfgang (1546–1610) moved his court to the castle, which had previously served only as the seat of a Vogt (reeve). Under his successor, Count Philipp Ernst of Hohenlohe (1584–1628), extensive construction activity began in the town. The town wall, gate, and gate tower—almost completely preserved to this day—as well as administrative and burgher houses were built. Although the ruling House of Hohenlohe was divided into several branches, the Reformation was introduced throughout the entire historical region of Hohenlohe by its territorial rulers by 1556. From 1576 until the Mediatisation of the County of Hohenlohe in 1806, Langenburg had a court preacher, a position combined with that of town pastor and, from 1579 onwards, also with the office of superintendent. Even before the Thirty Years' War, the 12th-century castle was rebuilt under Count Philipp Ernst into Langenburg Castle in the Renaissance style. During the Thirty Years' War, Langenburg was heavily devastated by imperial troops.

In 1672, two women, Elisabeth Schmieg of Hürden and Barbara Schleicher of Atzenrod, were convicted by the Centgericht in Langenburg, with the significant involvement of the local councillor and chancellery director Tobias Ulrich von Gülchen, among other things for witchcraft and murder by poisoning, and on 8 November were strangled and burned at the stake on the Galgenberg near Langenburg.

Like the rest of Hohenlohe, the town belonged to the Franconian Circle between 1500 and 1806.

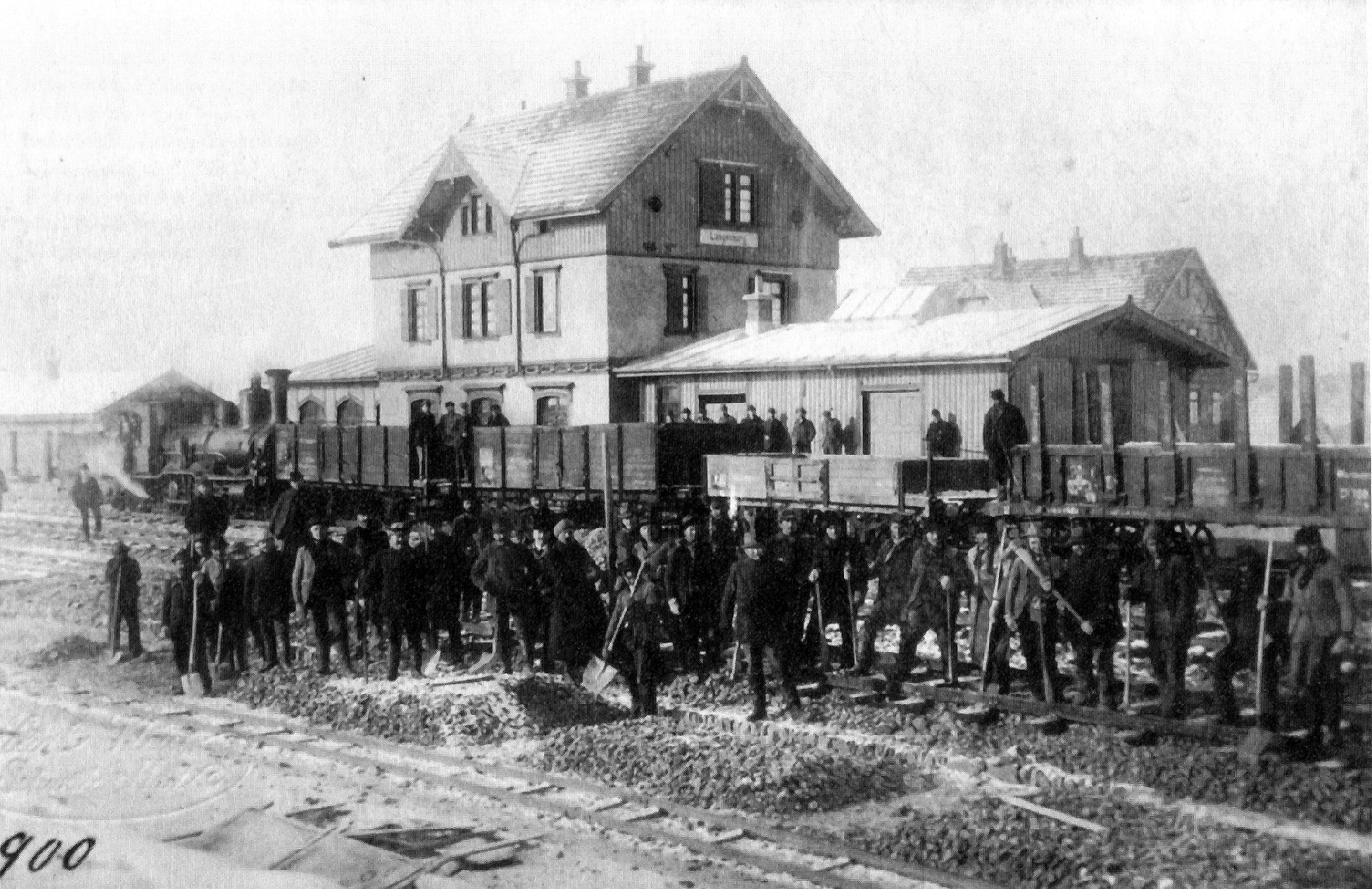
Langenburg railway station, around 1900

=== Württemberg period ===
In 1806, Langenburg fell to the Kingdom of Württemberg and from 1811 belonged to the Oberamt Gerabronn.

As early as the middle of the 19th century, the town sought a railway connection. Several attempts to connect it to the main railway network of the Württemberg State Railways, for example as part of the planning for the Heilbronn–Nuremberg railway line or the Bad Mergentheim–Aalen Tauber Valley Railway, failed. In 1892, planning began for a 12 km-long branch line running from Langenburg to Blaufelden. The necessary funds were approved on 30 June 1898, allowing construction work to begin in May 1899. The station buildings at Langenburg and Ludwigsruhe were built as standard Württemberg railway stations of types IIIa and IIa respectively. Nine months later, on Monday, 22 January 1900, the line was finally opened. Until the line's final closure in 1996, the town was connected to the railway network by the Blaufelden–Langenburg railway. Passenger services on the line had already ceased in 1963.

The administrative reform during the Nazi era resulted in Langenburg becoming part of the Crailsheim district in 1938.

During the Second World War, unlike the surrounding localities, Langenburg was spared from combat operations. The fact that a military hospital was established in the castle a few weeks before the end of the war is thought to have contributed significantly to this.

=== Postwar period ===
In 1945, Langenburg became part of the American occupation zone and thus belonged to the newly founded state of Württemberg-Baden. With the creation of Baden-Württemberg in 1952, Langenburg became part of the present-day federal state.

In 1963, the castle was severely damaged by a fire. On 1 February 1972, the previously independent municipality of Bächlingen was incorporated into Langenburg. As a result of the 1973 Baden-Württemberg district reform, on 1 January 1973 Langenburg was transferred from the dissolved Crailsheim district to the Schwäbisch Hall district.

=== Population development ===
Population figures according to the respective territorial boundaries. The figures up to 1961 are estimates; thereafter they are official updates by the respective statistical offices (main residences only). With an average of 57 inhabitants per square kilometre, Langenburg is well below the Baden-Württemberg state average of 301 inhabitants per km^{2} given by the State Statistical Office. Langenburg (including Atzenrod, Ludwigsruhe and Neuhof) has 1,307 inhabitants; Ober- and Unterregenbach have 134, Bächlingen (including Hürden) has 200, and Nesselbach has 110.

Year	1933	1939	1961	1971	1981	1991	2001	2011
Population	1174	1088	2084	2100	1833	1922	1848	1739

== Sights ==
Langenburg has a vintage car museum and the large Langenburg Castle, the seat of the family of Hohenlohe-Langenburg. The current owner of the castle and estate is Philipp, Prince of Hohenlohe-Langenburg.

== People ==
- Philip Ernest, Count of Hohenlohe-Langenburg (1584-1628), landowner, Count of Hohenlohe-Langenburg
- Henry Frederick, Count of Hohenlohe-Langenburg (1625-1699), landowner, Count of Hohenlohe-Langenburg
- Albert Wolfgang, Count of Hohenlohe-Langenburg (1659-1715), landowner, Count of Hohenlohe-Langenburg
- Ludwig, Prince of Hohenlohe-Langenburg (1696-1765), landowner, 1st Prince of Hohenlohe-Langenburg
- Christian Albrecht, Prince of Hohenlohe-Langenburg (1726-1789), landowner, 2nd Prince of Hohenlohe-Langenburg
- Karl Ludwig, Prince of Hohenlohe-Langenburg (1762-1825), landowner, 3rd Prince of Hohenlohe-Langenburg
- Ernst I, Prince of Hohenlohe-Langenburg (1794-1860), landowner, 4th Prince of Hohenlohe-Langenburg
- Viktor I, Duke of Ratibor (1818-1893), landowner and politician
- Carl Ludwig II, Prince of Hohenlohe-Langenburg (1829-1907), landowner and politician, 5th Prince of Hohenlohe-Langenburg
- Hermann, Prince of Hohenlohe-Langenburg (1832-1913), landowner and politician, 6th Prince of Hohenlohe-Langenburg
- Ernst II, Prince of Hohenlohe-Langenburg (1863-1950), landowner and politician, 7th Prince of Hohenlohe-Langenburg
- Gottfried, Prince of Hohenlohe-Langenburg (1897-1960), landowner, 8th Prince of Hohenlohe-Langenburg

== Gallery ==
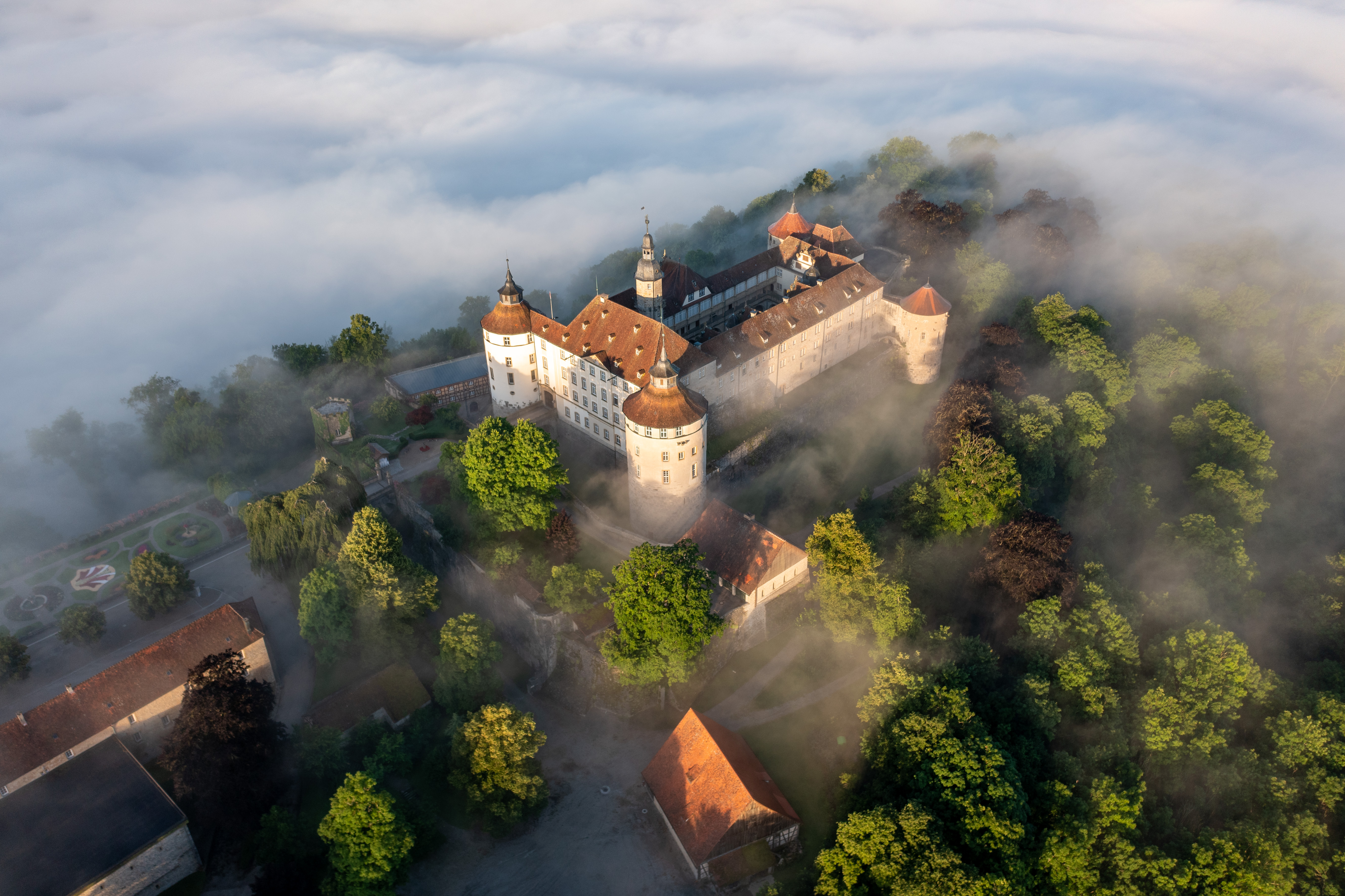
Langenburg Castle

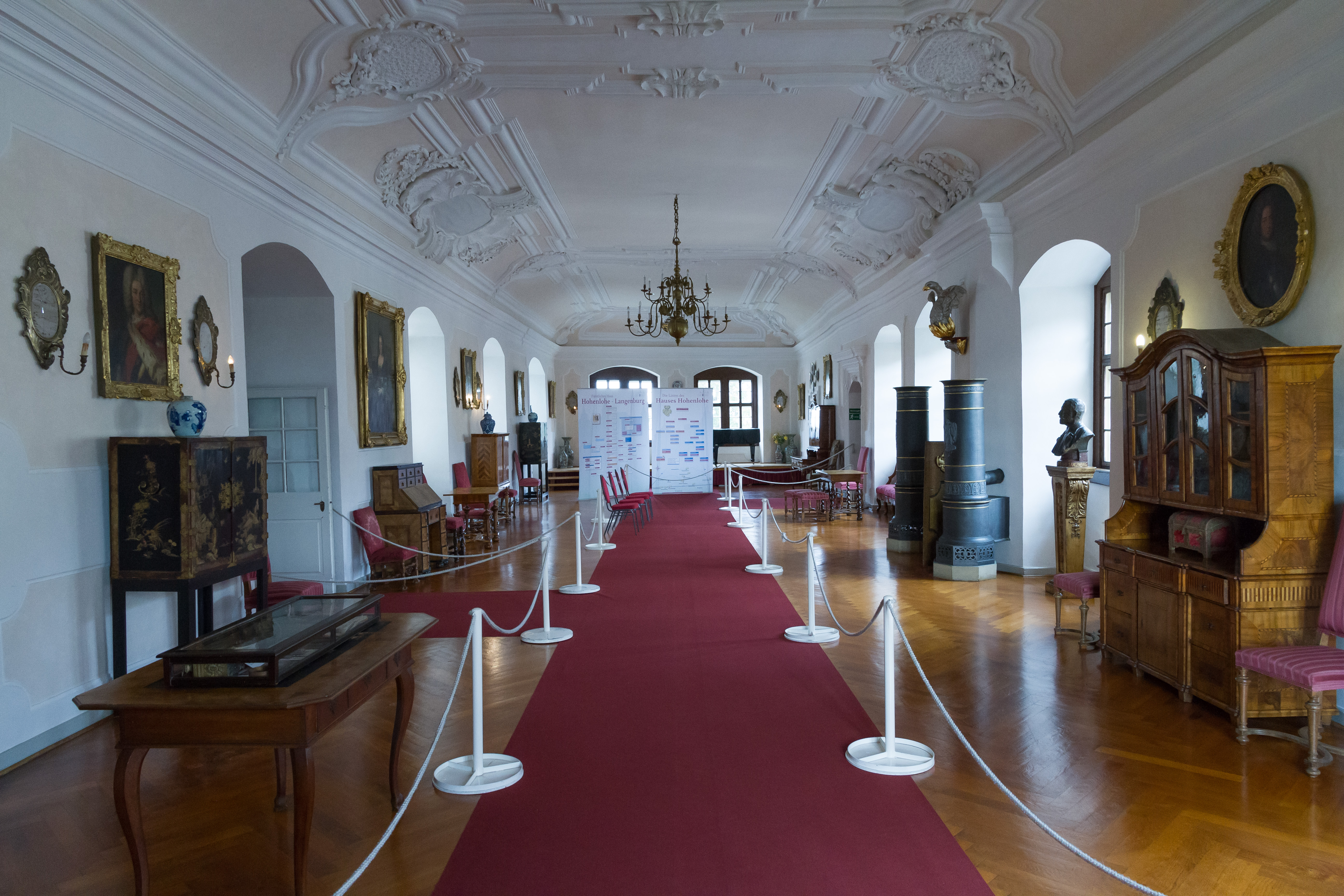
Castle museum

== Bibliography ==
- Robisheaux, Thomas (2009). The Last Witch of Langenburg: Murder in a German Village. W.W. Norton & Co. ISBN 978-0-393-06551-0.
