= Sonnewalde =

- Town
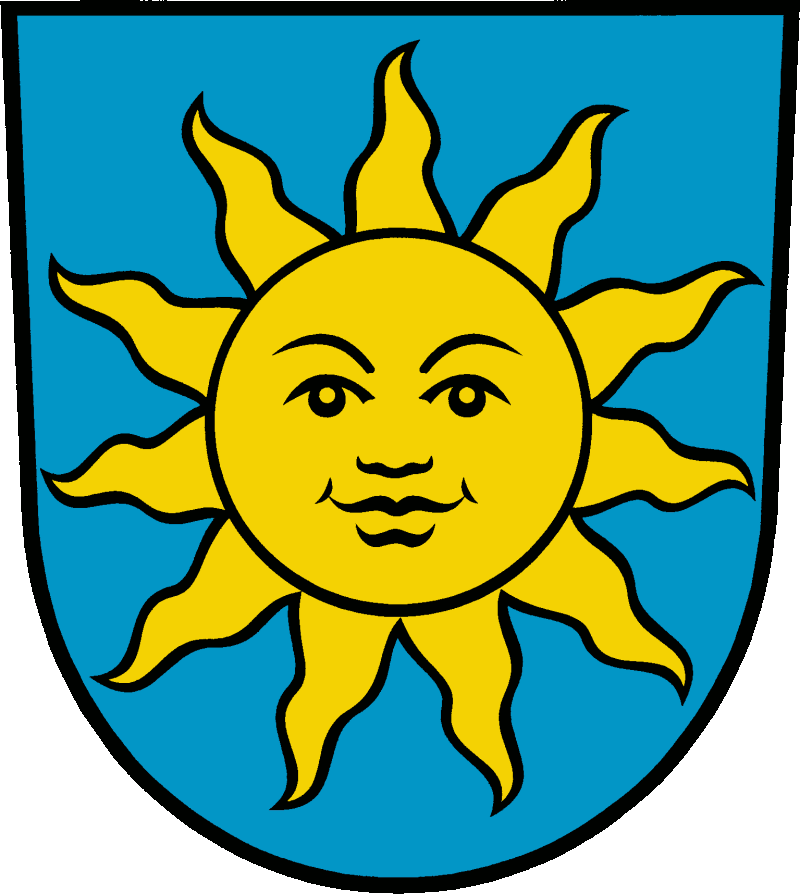
- Coat of arms

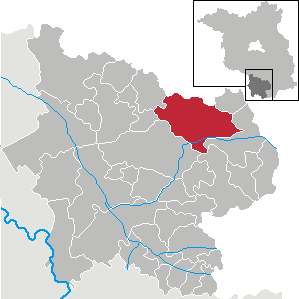
- Location of Sonnewalde within Elbe-Elster district
- Interactive map of Sonnewalde
- Location within Germany Location within Brandenburg
- Coordinates: 51°40′59″N 13°39′00″E
- Country: Germany
- State: Brandenburg
- District: Elbe-Elster
- Subdivisions: 17 Ortsteile bzw. Stadtbezirke

Government
  - Mayor (2019–27): Felix Freitag

Area
  - Total: 119.29 km^{2} (46.06 sq mi)
- Elevation: 101 m (331 ft)

Population (2025-12-31)
  - Total: 3,110
  - Density: 26.1/km^{2} (67.5/sq mi)
- Time zone: UTC+01:00 (CET)
  - Summer (DST): UTC+02:00 (CEST)
- Postal codes: 03249
- Dialling codes: 035323
- Vehicle registration: EE, FI, LIB
- Website: www.stadt-sonnewalde.de

Sonnewalde (German pronunciation: [ˈzɔnəvaldə]; Lower Sorbian: Groźišćo) is a town in the Elbe-Elster district, in Lower Lusatia, Brandenburg, Germany. It is situated 8 km northwest of Finsterwalde.

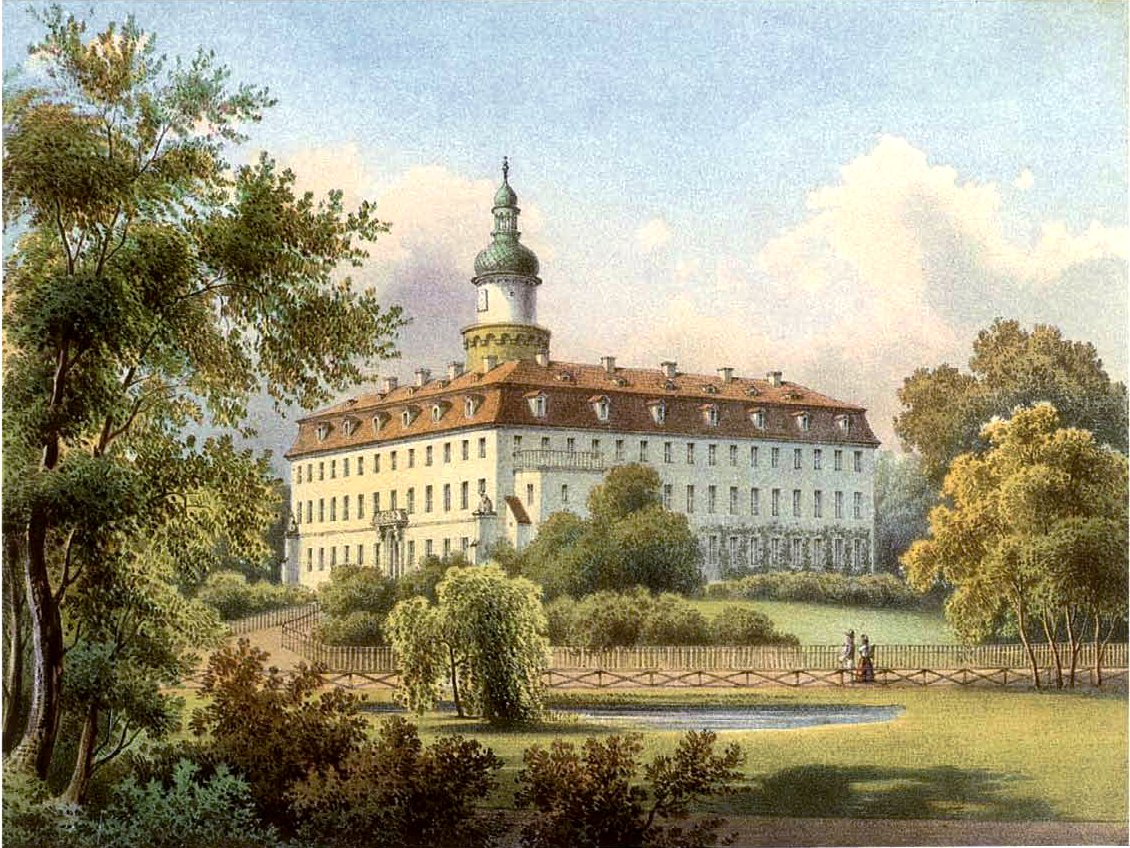
Palace Sonnewalde, around 1860, Edition by Alexander Duncker

== History ==
From 1815 to 1947, Sonnewalde was part of the Prussian Province of Brandenburg. From 1952 to 1990, it was part of the Bezirk Cottbus of East Germany.

== Demography ==
Development of Population since 1875 within the Current Boundaries (Blue Line: Population; Dotted Line: Comparison to Population Development of Brandenburg state; Grey Background: Time of Nazi rule; Red Background: Time of Communist rule)

Recent Population Development and Projections (Population Development before Census 2011 (blue line); Recent Population Development according to the Census in Germany in 2011 (blue bordered line); Official projections for 2005-2030 (yellow line); for 2017-2030 (scarlet line); for 2020-2030 (green line)

Sonnewalde: Population development
within the current boundaries (2018)

Year	Pop.	±% p.a.
1875	4,866	—
1890	4,789	−0.11%
1910	4,685	−0.11%
1925	4,489	−0.28%
1933	4,376	−0.32%
1939	4,290	−0.33%
1946	6,061	+5.06%
1950	5,793	−1.12%
1964	4,703	−1.48%
1971	4,524	−0.55%
1981	4,091	−1.00%
1985	4,010	−0.50%
1989	4,028	+0.11%
1990	3,989	−0.97%
1991	3,899	−2.26%

Year	Pop.	±% p.a.
1992	4,144	+6.28%
1993	4,114	−0.72%
1994	4,198	+2.04%
1995	4,093	−2.50%
1996	4,308	+5.25%
1997	4,025	−6.57%
1998	4,038	+0.32%
1999	4,139	+2.50%
2000	4,038	−2.44%
2001	4,010	−0.69%
2002	3,851	−3.97%
2003	3,771	−2.08%
2004	3,708	−1.67%
2005	3,673	−0.94%
2006	3,600	−1.99%

Year	Pop.	±% p.a.
2007	3,567	−0.92%
2008	3,529	−1.07%
2009	3,506	−0.65%
2010	3,452	−1.54%
2011	3,446	−0.17%
2012	3,385	−1.77%
2013	3,359	−0.77%
2014	3,343	−0.48%
2015	3,319	−0.72%
2016	3,261	−1.75%
2017	3,256	−0.15%
2018	3,231	−0.77%
2019	3,210	−0.65%
2020	3,154	−1.74%
