= Altenstein Palace =

Schloss (palace) upon a rocky hill on the south-western slope of the Thuringian Forest

Schloss Altenstein
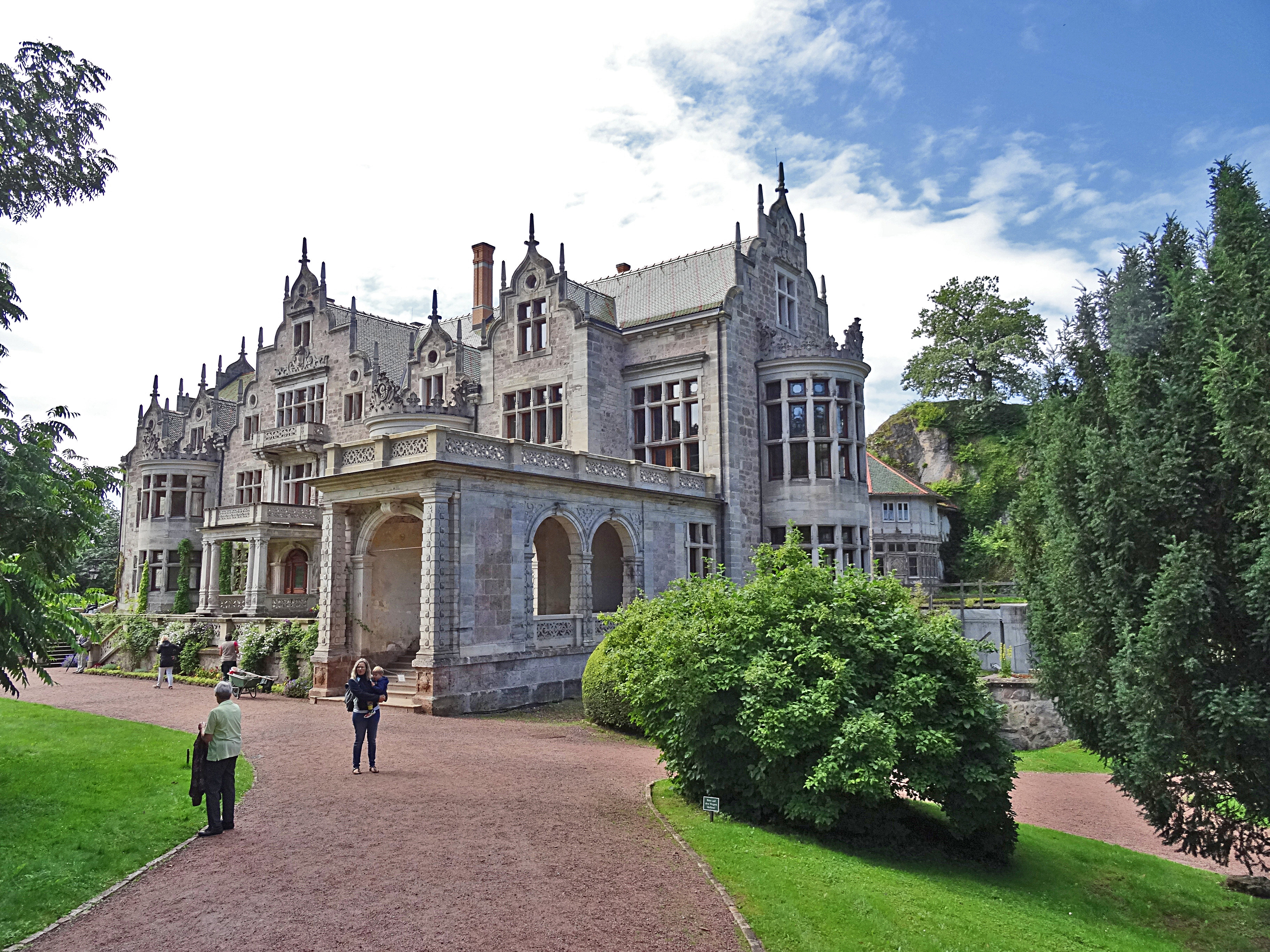
- Schloss Altenstein, 2021

- Location within Thuringia Location within Germany
- Former names: Der Stein

General information
- Architectural style: Renaissance Revival
- Location: Bad Liebenstein, Germany
- Coordinates: 50.835°N 10.352°E
- Completed: 1730s
- Renovated: 1888-90
- Client: Anton Ulrich, Duke of Saxe-Meiningen; Georg II, Duke of Saxe-Meiningen
- Owner: Stiftung Thüringer Schlösser und Gärten

Design and construction
- Architect: Albert Neumeister (last redesign)

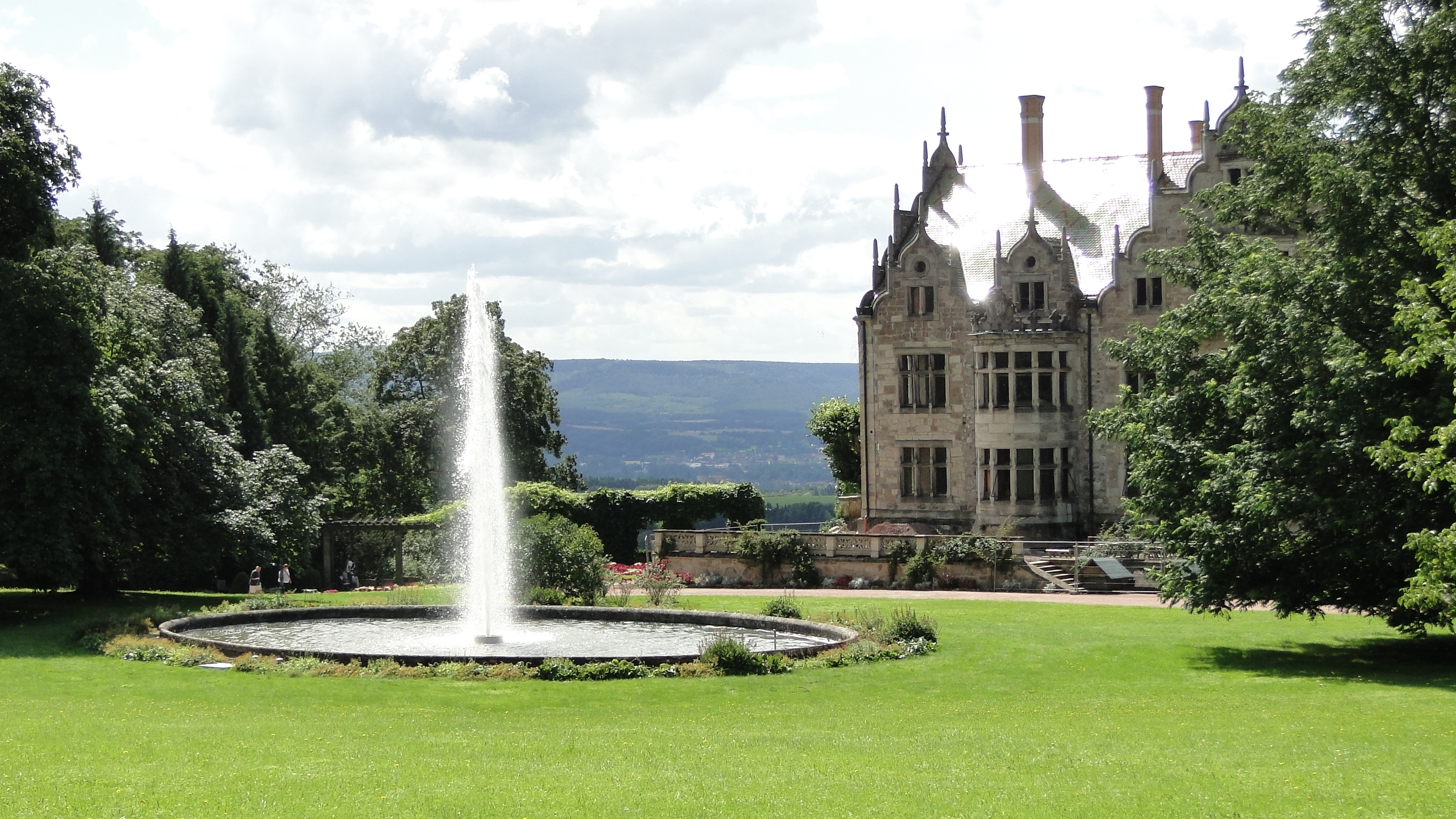
Schloss Altenstein seen from the gardens, Rhön hills in the background

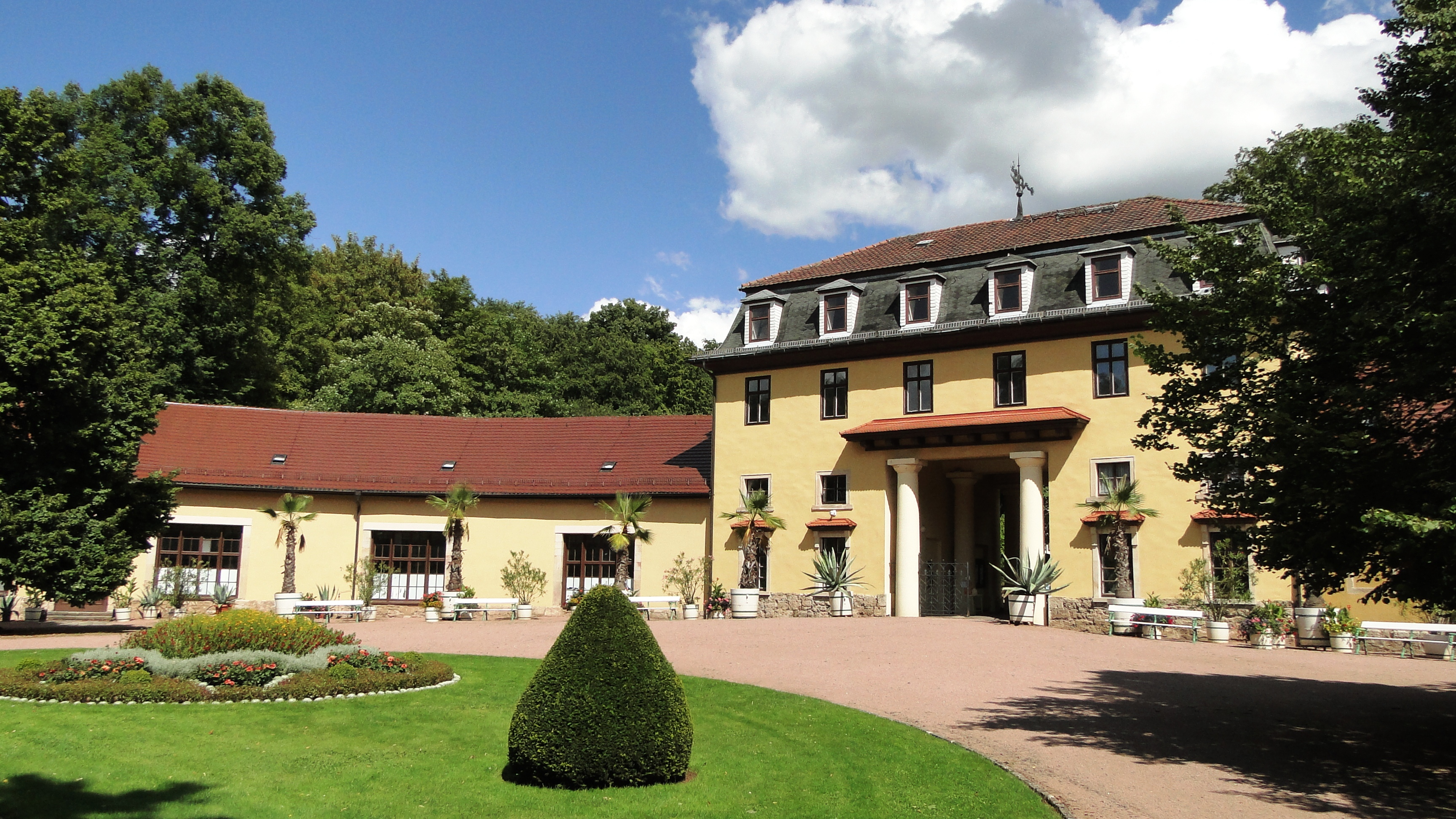
Hofmarschallamt, view from the gardens

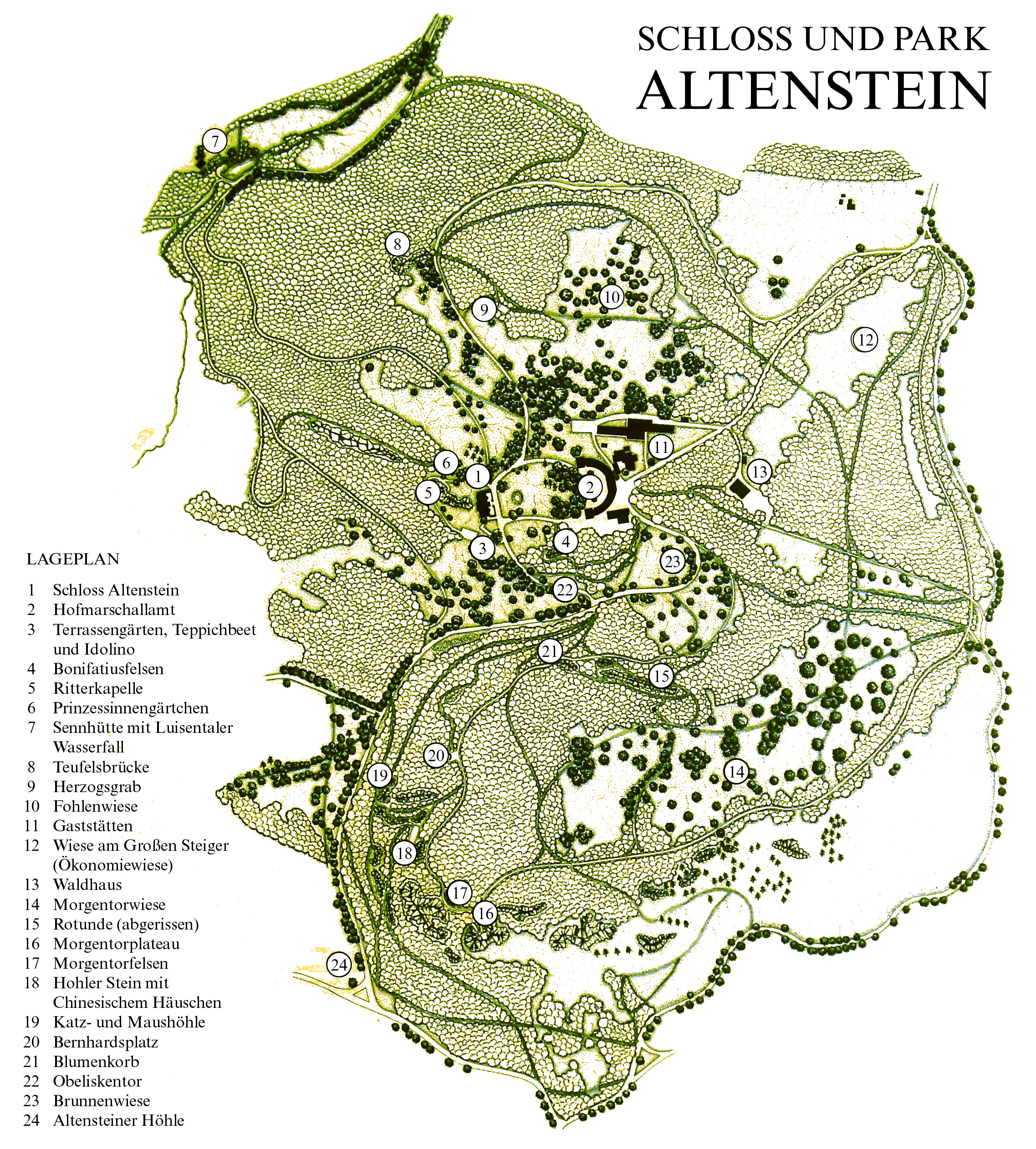
Map of the palace grounds

Schloss Altenstein is a schloss (a German term for palace) upon a rocky hill on the south-western slope of the Thuringian Forest, not far from Eisenach, Thuringia, Germany. It was the summer residence of the Dukes of Saxe-Meiningen, and is surrounded by 160 hectares (1.6 square kilometres) of English landscape garden, which contain, among other objects of interest, a cavern 300 metres long, through which flows a large and rapid stream.

== Geography ==
Altenstein is a part of the municipality of Bad Liebenstein in the Wartburgkreis near Eisenach, Thuringia, Germany. It sits on a platform with a height of around 460 metres above sea level, part of the dolomite hills at the western edge of the Thuringian Forest. It is surrounded by 160 hectares of park, which includes several pinnacles of Zechstein rock.

== History ==
=== Previous structures ===
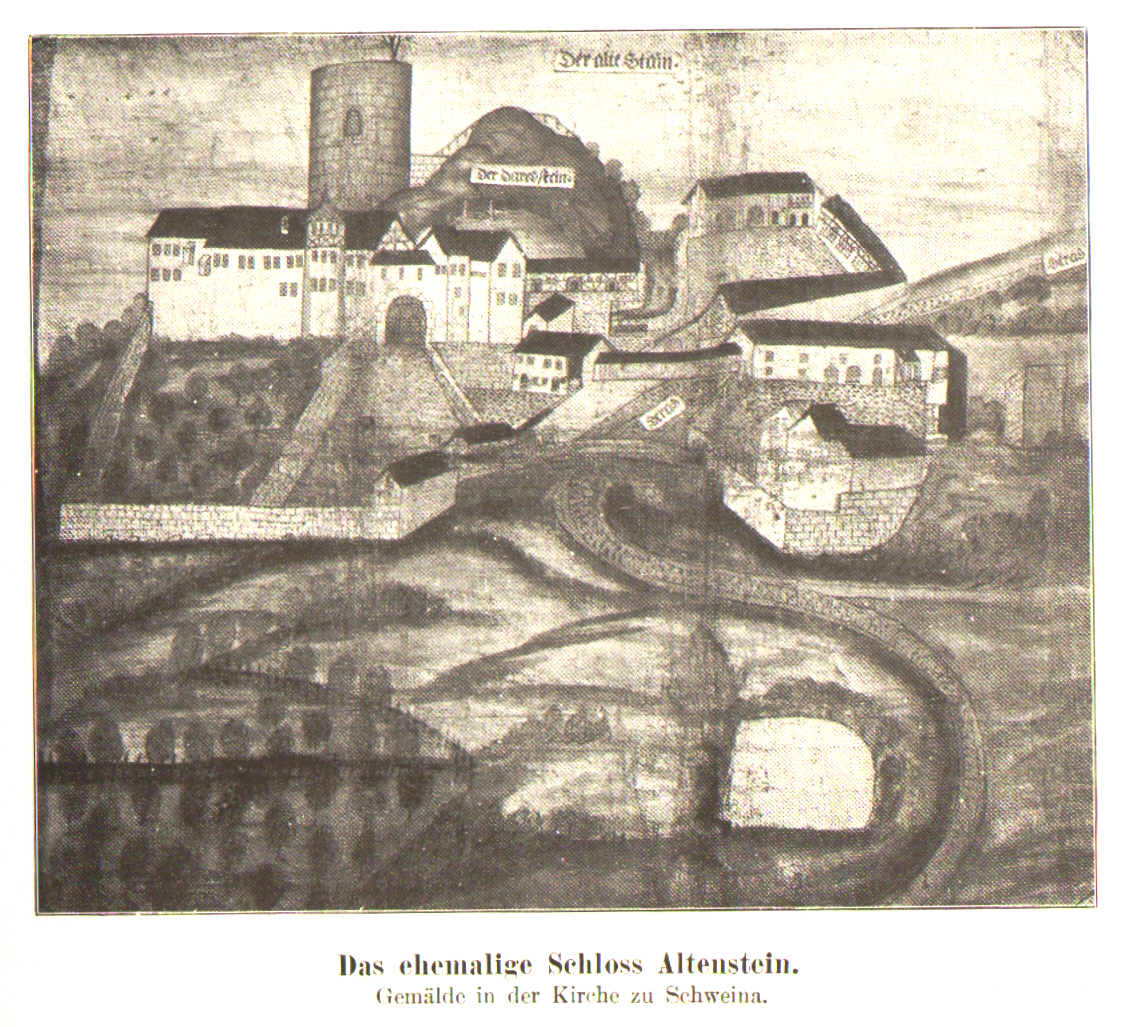
Painting of the castle destroyed in 1733

A fortified structure, possibly initially a pre-Christian holy site, may have been roughly in the same location as the current house by the 6th century. The structure at this original site was later referred to as Alter Steyn. Saint Boniface, the apostle of the Germans, reportedly lived and preached at Altenstein in 724 and built a chapel on the so-called Bonifatiusfelsen. A new castle (Neuenburg) was later built at this site by the Kloster Fulda. In 1116, a knight "Dudo von Steyn" (later known as von Frankenstein) was mentioned as holding a castle here. Neuenburg itself was first mentioned in an extant document in 1150. In 1225, the older castle was first referred to as de antique lapide ("Old Stone").

From the mid-14th century, the castle was in the possession of the Landgraves of Thuringia. According to a 1330 document, in that year the von Frankenstein family sold the Neuenburg to Berthold VIII von Henneberg. In 1346, Friedrich der Ernsthafte, Landgraf von Thüringen bought the Altenstein, but not the Neuenburg (which remained with the Henneberg family until 1495), from Heinrich von Salza, steward of the Prince-Bishop of Würzburg at Meiningen. In 1347, Friedrich der Strenge married Katharina von Henneberg, the local estates of Steinbach and Schweina were given to her as dowry. In 1353, after the death of Katharina's mother, Friedrich united these lands with Altenstein, Gumpelstadt and Waldfisch to create the Vogtei Altenstein.

Around 1370, Altenstein was in the hand of Raubritter, calling themselves "Sterner". In 1379, they sacked Meiningen. In 1402, Landgraf Balthasar, residing on Wartburg Castle, stopped their activities.

In the late 15th century, the Altenstein passed to the Ernestine branch of the House of Wettin (in 1485) who gave it as a fief to the Franconian family of Hans Hund von Wenkheim (died 1505) in 1492. In 1495, Hans Hund also bought the Neuenburg.

Not far from the Altenstein is the place where, in 1521, Martin Luther was "seized" by the order of the elector Frederick the Wise in a staged kidnapping, to be carried off to the Wartburg. An old beech called "Luther's Tree", which tradition connected with the reformer, was blown down in 1841, and a small monument now stands in its place.

The Neuenburg was destroyed and the Altenstein damaged in 1554. The subsequent reconstruction work caused strife between the Hund family and the local communities about the use of socage. This lasted for 70 years and resulted in the Reichsacht being placed on several members of the family in 1622. In 1640, during the Thirty Years' War Imperial troops sacked Altenstein Castle.

In 1699, Erhard Friedrich Hund ended witchhunts in his possessions. Between 1485 and 1699, 18 people had been killed in the Amt Altenstein as a result of persecution for witchcraft. Erhard also founded a hospital and an orphanage at Schweina.

In 1722, the family Hund von Wenkheim died out and the fief passed back to the Ernestines, the Dukes of Saxe-Meiningen.

=== Current structure ===
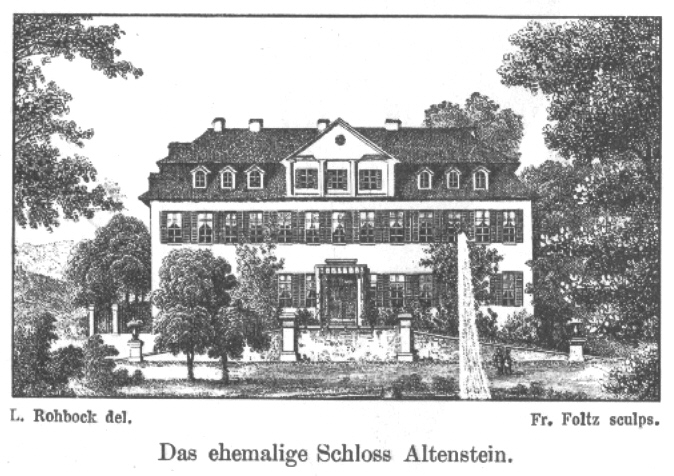
The Baroque Schloss, c. 1750

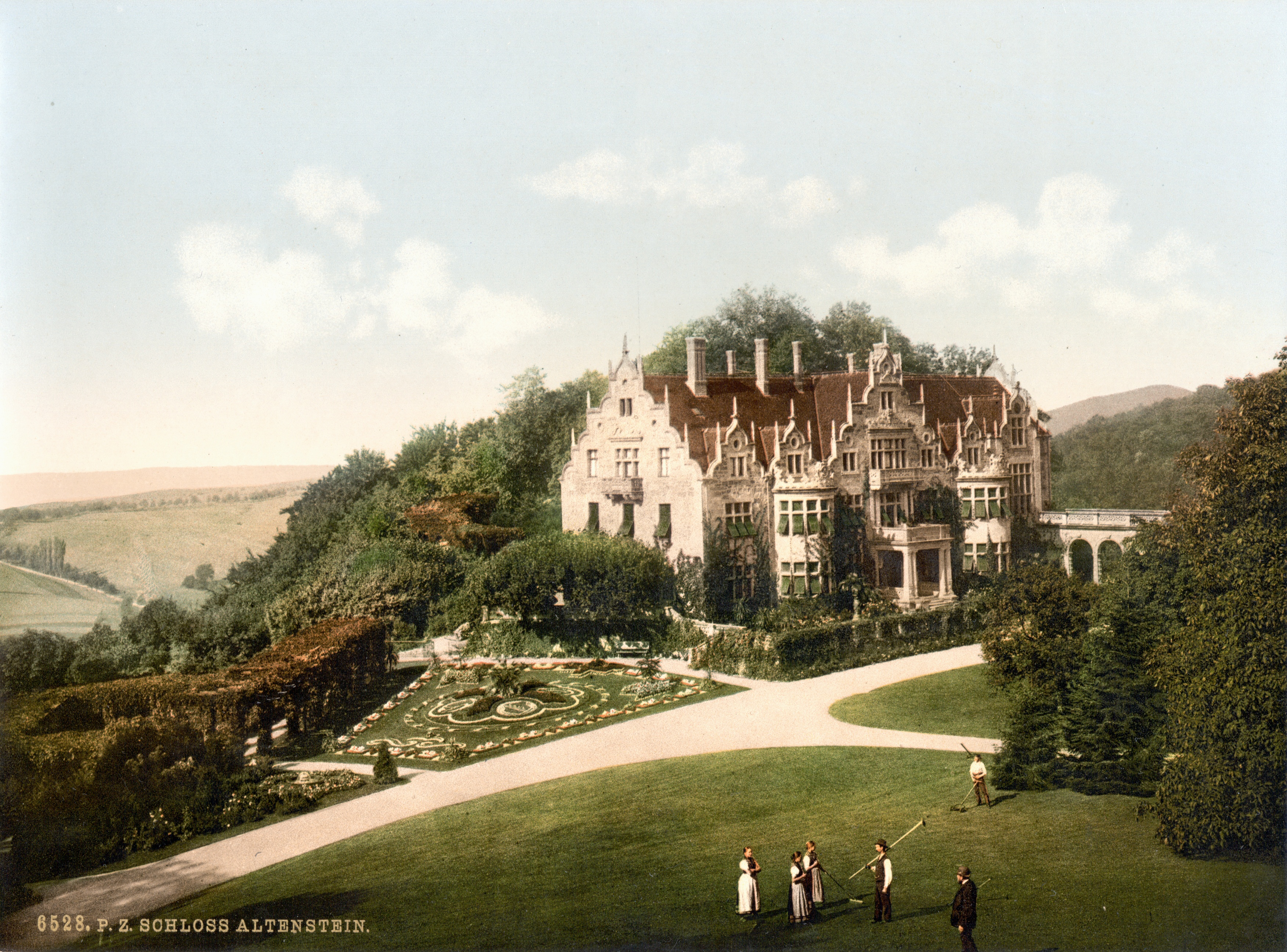
Schloss Altenstein, c. 1900

In the night of 27/28 April 1733, an arsonist set fire to Steinbach, destroying 106 houses. Sparks and burning debris were carried all the way to the Altenstein, setting it alight. The old castle was completely destroyed. In 1736, a new palace in the Baroque style was erected by order of Anton Ulrich, Duke of Saxe-Meiningen. The architect was Alessandro Rossini. However, the client was not pleased with the result since he expected the palace to face south and not as constructed towards the east. Reportedly, the Duke never used the palace. Yet his son, Duke Georg I began to use the palace from 1798 as the summer residence for himself and his family. He had some improvements made at the Schloss and the Hofmarschallamt (a simple three-storied building with Doric columns flanking the entry) was constructed. Georg I also had some changes made to the park. In 1799, the Altenstein cave was discovered during road works.

Duke Bernhard II repeatedly asked architects – including the British court architect Jeffry Wyattville, to whom Bernhard had connections through his sister Adelheid (wife of William IV) – to devise new plans for the palace, but none of them were implemented. In 1866, Bernhard resigned as Duke as a result of the Austro-Prussian War. However, he retained the Altenstein and lived there until his death in 1882. His wife Marie died in 1887. Only under their son Georg II did work at the house and park recommence. In 1888, he asked his court architect, Albert Neumeister, to come up with proposals and suggested as examples Hatfield House and Knole House. Neumeister and Georg II eventually settled on a compromise design. Whilst the architect had argued for a completely new palace, Georg II insisted on adding or changing the existing structure. The result was a palace that used the basic Baroque structure, but was designed in the English Renaissance Revival style, featuring two-storied oriels, bow windows, numerous chimneys, and obelisk ornaments. This style, unique in Thuringia, was inspired by the relationships of the Meiningen dynasty to Great Britain and the taste of Georg II (also known as the "Theatre-Duke"), who liked the plays of William Shakespeare.

The gardens had been redesigned beginning in the 1840s, after a visit by Hermann, Fürst von Pückler-Muskau in 1845. He was impressed by the park but gave the owner detailed advice on how to improve it. Actual design work was done by Weimar court gardener Carl Eduard Petzold. Ten years after Pückler-Muskau, Peter Joseph Lenné also offered some advice.

Altenstein was the summer residence of the Dukes of Saxe-Meiningen until the end of the monarchy in 1918. Although the upkeep of palace and park was subsequently neglected (in 1918 vandals destroyed the Teufelsbrücke and in 1923 the "Chinese Pavilion" had to be torn down), the ducal family retained use of the Altenstein. When Princess Charlotte of Prussia, the wife of the last reigning Duke of Saxe-Meiningen, Bernhard III, and a granddaughter of Queen Victoria and sister of the last German Emperor, Wilhelm II, died in 1919, the Duke had a burial site created in the park; she was buried there in 1920. He himself died in 1928 and was buried next to his wife.

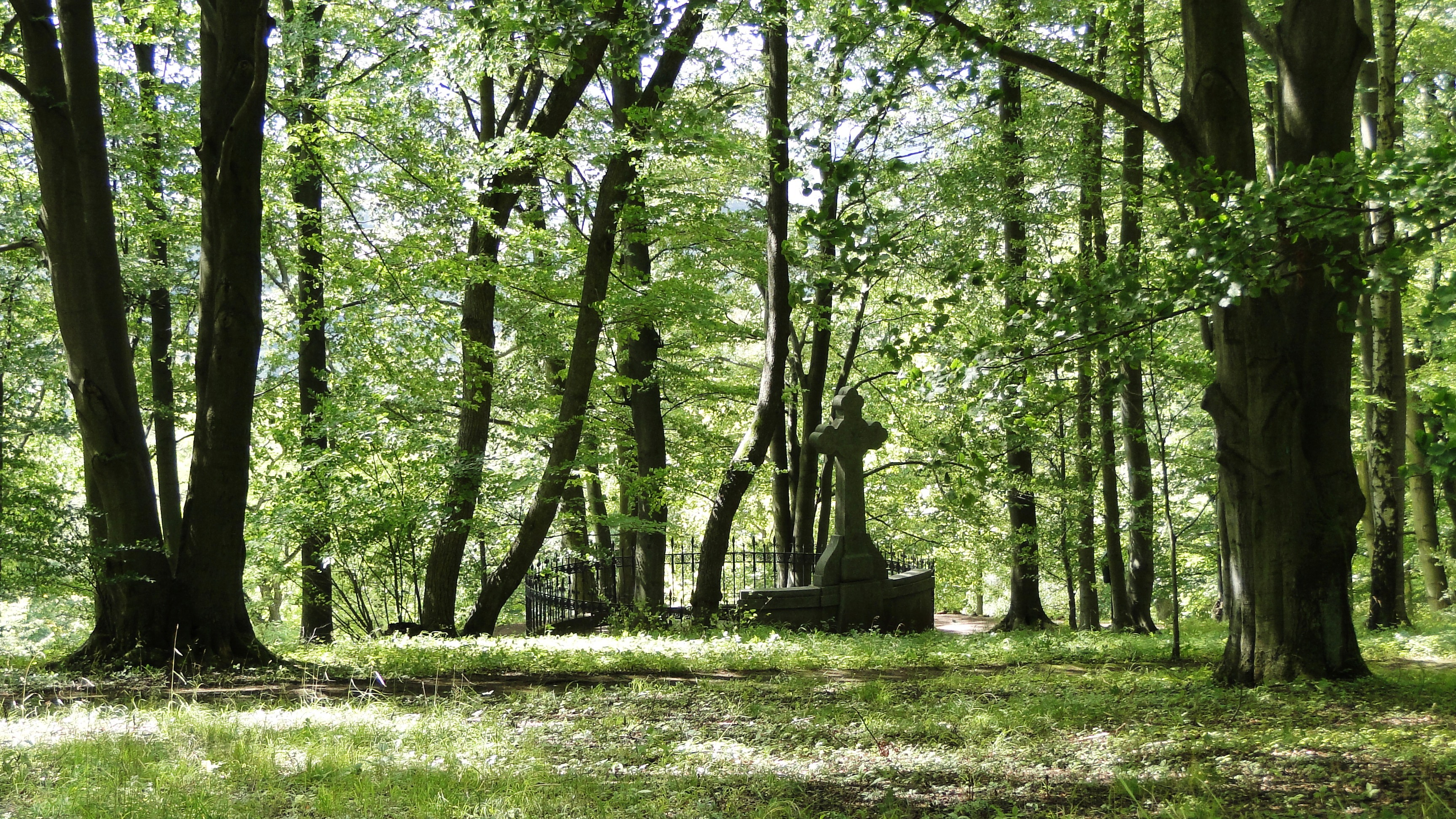
Park Altenstein: Burial site of the last Duke and Duchess of Saxe-Meiningen

The Altenstein remained the property of the family until Ernst, Prince of Saxe-Meiningen, died in 1941. His widow, Käthe Baroness von Saalfeld (née Katharina Jensen, daughter of poet Wilhelm Jensen), decided to sell the property to the state of Thuringia in 1942. Although negotiations with the company running the Liebenstein spa (which had also rented the property) were well advanced, once the state declared an interest, these agreements were revoked. On 5 August 1942, Ralf Baron von Saalfeld (as executor of the will) sold the Altenstein estate to Thuringia for 521,000 Reichsmark (equivalent to 2 million 2021 euros). During World War II it served as a recreation home for the Oberkommando der Wehrmacht from 1943 to 1945. It served briefly as barracks for American and then for Soviet troops. After the Soviet occupation in 1945, the palace became a recreation home for the Handwerkskammer Thüringen (Thuringian chamber of skilled crafts) in 1946. From 1951 to 1958, the Hofmarschallamt housed a Forstfachschule (a school for forestry workers), and then a school for Agraringenieure (through 1990). In place of the ruined nursery, a boarding school was built in 1972. The park became part of the public forestry business run from Bad Salzungen.

In 1981, palace and park were declared a listed monument by the district authorities (at the time the Suhl district). However, on 4 February 1982, the palace was destroyed by a fire resulting from an electrical defect, causing a total loss of all the interior designs. The roof collapsed and only the outer walls survived. Since 1984, it has been in the process of being rebuilt; but after delays related to the German reunification, so far only the roof and some windows have been fixed. In 2013, reconstruction of the Festssal was completed. This was supported by Federal funds from the program Investitionen für nationale Kultureinrichtungen in Ostdeutschland.

In 1994, the State of Thuringia confirmed the listed status of the Altenstein and since 1995, the palace has been part of the portfolio of the properties of Stiftung Thüringer Schlösser und Gärten. According to them, around 8.5 million euro will be required to complete the restoration.

== Today ==
The Schloss and park are open to the public. The outbuildings house a restaurant, a technical academy run by the TÜV Thüringen and a nature information centre. The former boarding school had been turned into a hotel, but is now closed.

The palace is now deemed a Kulturdenkmal von nationaler Bedeutung (cultural monument of national importance). The Federal government financially supported the creation of a memorial commemorating the presence of composer Johannes Brahms, who visited the palace twice. This small museum opened in May 2017, allowing the general public access to the palace itself for the first time. The annual number of visitors to the park is around 130,000. As of May 2017, construction work on the palace is expected to be completed by 2021.

The cave in the park is accessible to visitors for around 300 metres. There are occasional concerts inside a 12-metre-high domed cavern.
