= Steinbach, Wartburgkreis =

Steinbach
- Ortsteil of Bad Liebenstein
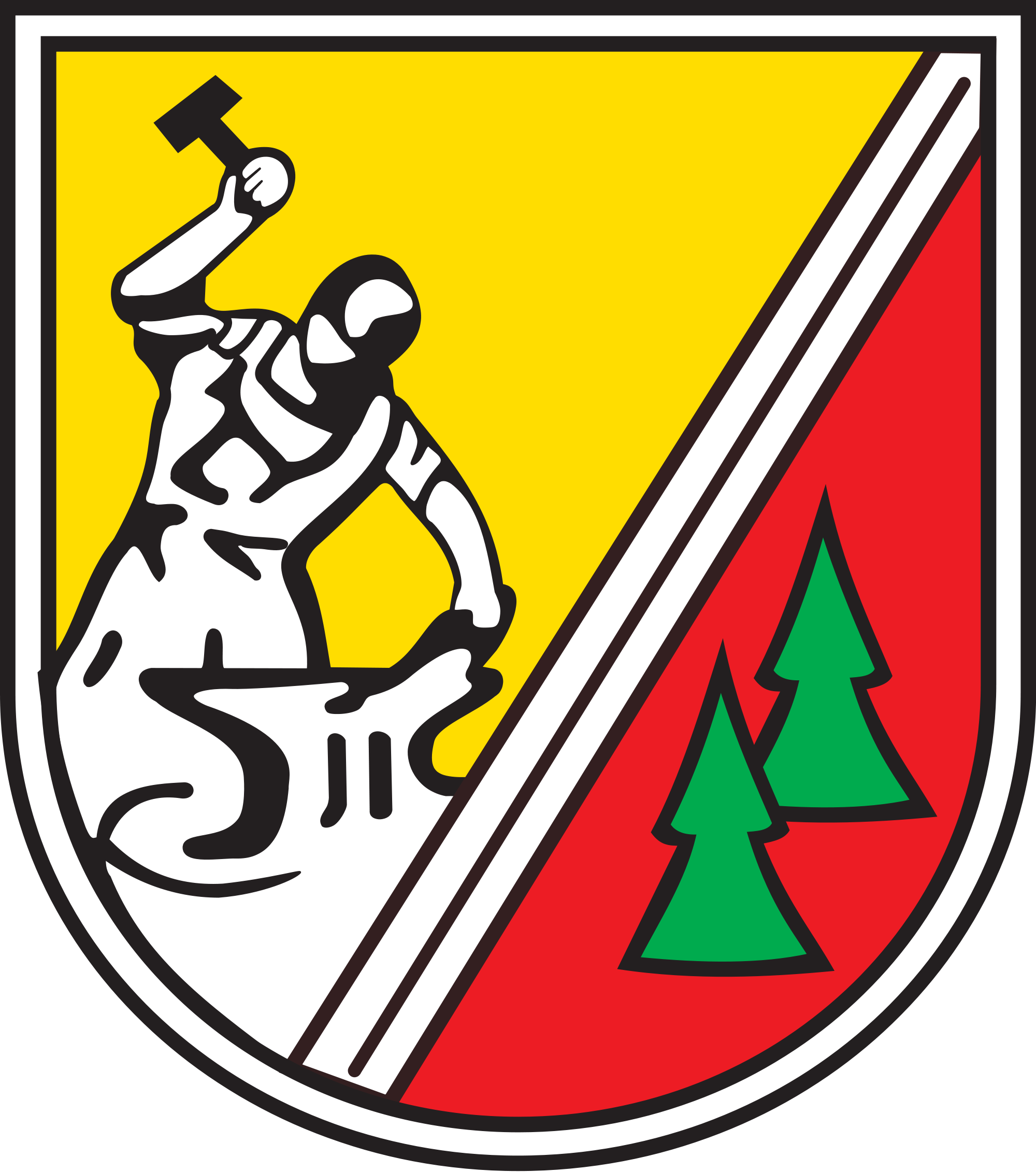
- Coat of arms
- Interactive map of Steinbach
- Location within Germany Location within Thuringia
- Coordinates: 50°50′N 10°22′E
- Country: Germany
- State: Thuringia
- District: Wartburgkreis
- Town: Bad Liebenstein

Area
  - Total: 15.06 km^{2} (5.81 sq mi)
- Elevation: 390 m (1,280 ft)

Population (2011-12-31)
  - Total: 1,185
  - Density: 78.69/km^{2} (203.8/sq mi)
- Time zone: UTC+01:00 (CET)
  - Summer (DST): UTC+02:00 (CEST)
- Postal codes: 36448
- Dialling codes: 036961
- Vehicle registration: WAK
- Website: www.bergdorf-steinbach.de

Steinbach (German pronunciation: [ˈʃtaɪnbax]) is a village and former municipality in the Wartburgkreis district of Thuringia, Germany. Since 31 December 2012, it is part of Bad Liebenstein.
