= Jeffry Wyatville =

English architect (1766–1840)

Sir Jeffry Wyatville
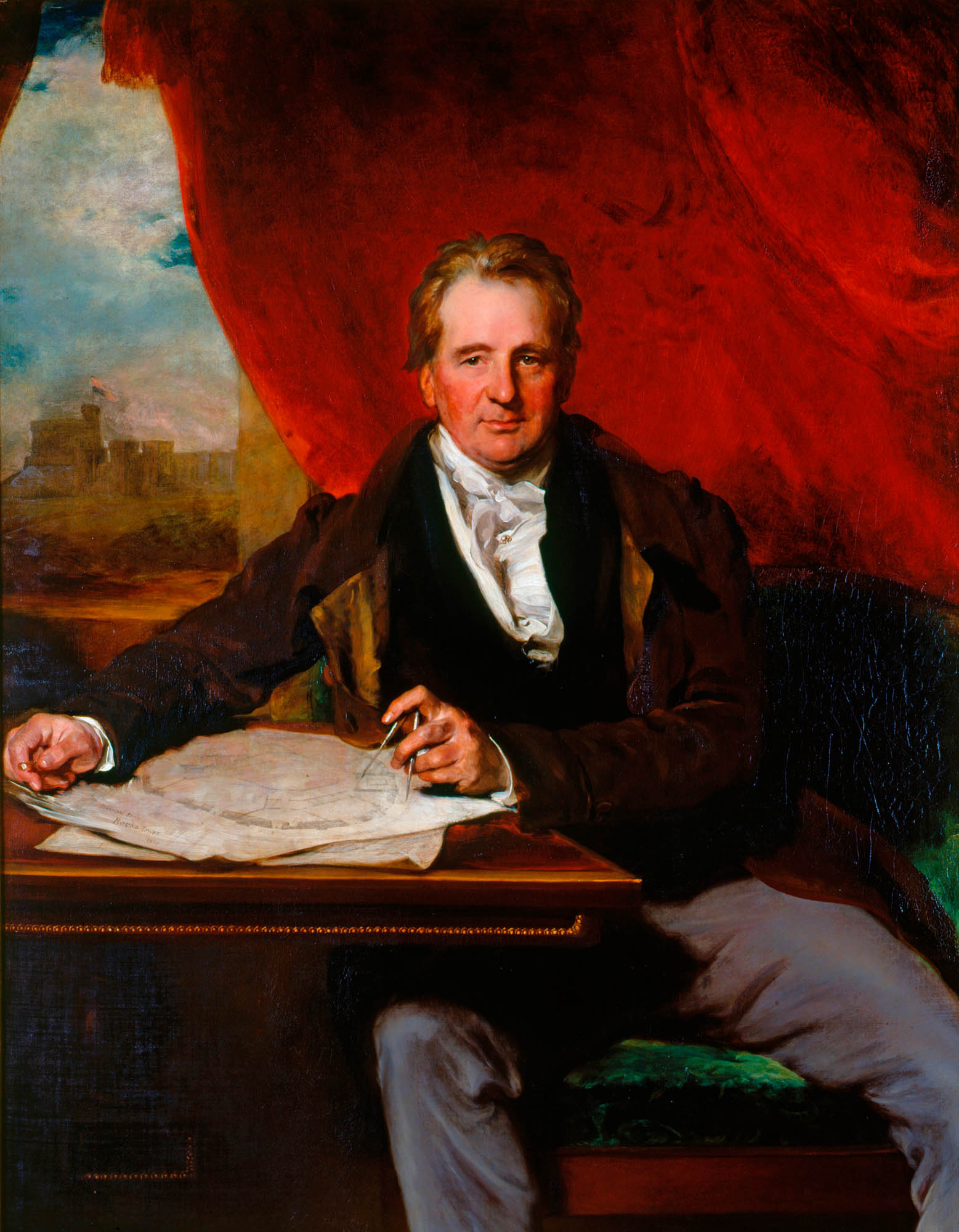
- Portrait of Jeffry Wyatville by Sir Thomas Lawrence c.1828
- Born: Jeffry Wyatt; 3 August 1766; Burton upon Trent, England
- Died: 18 February 1840 (aged 73); London, England
- Occupation: Architect
- Buildings: Windsor Castle

Drawing showing Wyatville's Gothic transformation to the buildings of the upper ward of Windsor Castle

Drawing showing the intended changes to the Prince of Wales Tower at Windsor Castle

Sir Jeffry Wyatville RA (3 August 1766 – 18 February 1840) was an English architect and garden designer. Born Jeffry Wyatt into an established dynasty of architects, in 1824 he was allowed by King George IV to change his surname to Wyatville (frequently misspelled Wyattville). He is mainly remembered for making alterations and extensions to Chatsworth House and Windsor Castle.

== Life ==
Jeffry Wyatt was born on 3 August 1766 in Burton upon Trent, the first surviving child of Joseph (1739–1785) and Myrtilla Wyatt, who died shortly after Jeffry's birth. He was educated at the grammar school in Burton upon Trent. Shortly after the death of his father, Wyatville began his architectural training in his uncle Samuel Wyatt's office. He remained with Samuel until 1792 when he moved from the Midlands to his uncle James Wyatt's office in Queen Anne Street, London. He later completed the gothic Ashridge in Hertfordshire after his uncle James's death in 1813. Wyatville sent designs to the Royal Academy every year from 1786 to 1822 and less frequently thereafter. There is no evidence that Wyatville ever undertook foreign travel as part of his education, probably because of the Napoleonic Wars. Wyatville was elected Associate of the Royal Academy on 4 November 1822. On 10 February 1824, he was elected a Royal Academician of the Royal Academy, his diploma work being a drawing of the unexecuted design for Brocklesby Hall.

His largest commission, the remodelling of Windsor Castle begun in 1824, when Parliament voted £300,000 for the purpose. The eventual cost was over £1,000,000 (a quarter of which covered furnishing). A competition was held between four invited architects, Wyatville, Robert Smirke, John Nash and John Soane, the architects (with the exception of Soane who withdrew from the competition) submitted their designs, in June Wyatville was announced as the winner. The foundation stone was laid on 12 August 1824 by King George IV at what would become the George IV gateway. Wyatville took up residence in the Winchester Tower in the castle in 1824 and would use it for the rest of his life. Eventually the Upper Ward of the Castle would be reconstructed. It was while at Windsor that he designed Golden Grove at Llandeilo in Carmarthenshire for the 1st Earl Cawdor, completed 1834, and its 'sister house', Lilleshall Hall in Shropshire, for the 1st Duke of Sutherland, completed 1829.

He was knighted by George IV in 1828. He was buried in St. George's Chapel, Windsor Castle on 25 February 1840 following his death on 18 February. His memorial stone is in the north-east corner behind the high altar, and bears this inscription:

In the vault beneath are deposited the remains of Sir Jeffry Wyatville R.A. under whose direction the new construction and restoration of the ancient and royal castle of Windsor were carried out during the reigns of George the 4th William the 4th and of Her Majesty Queen Victoria he died February 18th A.D. 1840 in the 74th year of his age.

== List of architectural work ==
His designs include:

- Gresford Lodge, Denbighshire, attributed, new house (c.1790)
- Sydney, attributed, prefabricated hospital (1790) demolished
- Wherstead Lodge, Wherstead, Suffolk, attributed, new house (1792)
- Hyde Park, London, proposal for entrance lodges (1794)
- Bladon Castle, Staffordshire (c.1799)
- Cottage, Brixton, Devon (c.1799)
- Hilfield Castle, Hertfordshire, new house (c.1799)
- Woolley Park, Berkshire, alterations (c.1799)
- Corsham Court, Wiltshire, unspecified work (c.1800)
- Slane, County Meath, Ireland, design for a market house (c.1800)
- Wynnstay, Denbighshire, Cenotaph (c.1800–12)
- Longleat, Wiltshire, new stables, orangery, Horningsham Lodge and interior alterations (1800–1811), designs for upper dining room and saloon (1829–30) of the interiors only the Grand Staircase, Green Library and several white marble chimneypieces survived the remodelling of the state rooms by John Dibblee Crace in the 1870s and 1880s
- Wollaton Hall, Nottingham, house interiors (c.1801) and (1823) new lodges (1823) and (1832)
- Burley-on-the-Hill, House, Rutland, design of terrace (1801)
- 24 Hertford Street, Mayfair, London, alterations (1802) demolished
- 49 (now 39) Lower Brook Street, Mayfair, London, remodelling (1802), (1821) & (1823), this was Wyatville's home and office
- Nonsuch Park, Surrey, new house and lodge (1802)
- Greatham Hospital, County Durham, new building (1803)
- Hyde Hall, Hertfordshire, remodelling and extension of house and new gate lodges (1803)
- Holland House, London, proposed alterations (1804)
- Browsholme Hall, Lancashire, decoration of new gallery (1806)
- Roche Court, Hampshire, new lodge (1808)
- Rood Ashton House, Wiltshire, additions and remodelling (1808) demolished
- Thurland Castle, Lancashire (c.1809) restoration and additions (c.1809)
- Badminton House, Gloucestershire, alterations, including the library, drawing room, staircase and conservatory (1809–13)
- Belton House, Lincolnshire, alterations, new dairy, orangery, brewhouse and cottages (1809–20)
- St George's Church, Everton, Liverpool, consulted about problems with tower (1809)
- 29 Grosvenor Square, London, alterations (1809) demolished
- Hayne Manor, Devon, attributed, alterations (c.1810)
- Design for school house, Milton Abbot, Devon (c.1810)
- Tollgate House, Mitchel Troy (c.1810)
- Endsleigh Cottage, Devon, a cottage orné, furniture and estate buildings (1810)
- Lypiatt Park, Gloucestershire, attributed, alterations (1810)
- Bretby Hall, Derbyshire (c.1812)
- Bulstrode Park, Buckinghamshire, design for completing the building, not executed (1812)
- Dinton Park, Wiltshire, new house (1812–17) renamed Philipps House in 1916
- Towneley Park, Lancashire, alterations to house (1812)
- Stubton Hall, Stubton, Lincolnshire, remodelled house and new conservatory (1813)
- Ashridge, Hertfordshire, designed by his uncle James Wyatt who died in 1813, he then completed the building including the Bridgewater Monument (c.1814–1839)
- Cassiobury House, Hertfordshire alterations to house (c.1814) demolished
- Hinton House, Yeovil, Somerset, additions to house (c.1814)
- Church of St John the Baptist, Frome, Somerset, forecourt screen (1814)
- Langold Park, Yorkshire, new house (1814) demolished
- Teddesley Hall, Staffordshire, alterations and additions (1814)
- Thoresby Hall, Nottinghamshire, alterations and additions (1814), rebuilt by Anthony Salvin
- Allendale House, Wimborne Minster, Dorset, new house (c.1815)
- Bretton Hall, West Yorkshire, additions, camellia house and estate buildings (c.1815)
- Denford Park, Berkshire, new house (c.1815)
- Trebartha House, Cornwall, additions and alterations (1815)
- Mortuary Chapel, Church of St Peter and St Paul, Belton, Lincolnshire (1816)
- 6 Grosvenor Square, London, alterations (1816) demolished
- Woburn Abbey, Bedfordshire, alterations to the sculpture gallery (1816), botanical house (1836)
- Brancepeth Castle. County Durham, attributed, alterations (c.1817)
- Hampton Court, Herefordshire, attributed, alterations to house (c.1817)
- Banner Cross Hall, Sheffield, Yorkshire, new house (1817–21)
- Layout of St Ann's Cliff, Buxton, Derbyshire (c.1818)
- Chatsworth House, Derbyshire, alterations to the house including the library, and addition of north wing with Great Dining Room, Sculpture Gallery, Orangery, Theatre, bedrooms, kitchen and service areas, lodges and other estate buildings (1818–40)
- Gopsall Hall, Leicestershire, alterations to house and new entrance lodge (1819)
- Church of St. Peter and St. Paul, Little Gaddesden, Hertfordshire, additions (1819) and (1830)
- Restoration of Church of St Peter, Great Berkhamsted (c.1820)
- Bishop's Wood House, Hertfordshire, attributed (c.1820)
- Claverton Manor, nr. Bath, Somerset, new house (c.1820)
- Raglan Castle, Monmouthshire, consulted about a possible restoration (c.1820)
- Firbeck Hall, Yorkshire, Attributed to the new design of the house (c.1820)
- Brocklesby Hall, Lincolnshire, design for a new house, not executed (1820)
- Woolley Park, Yorkshire, new lodges and gateway (1820)
- Trebursey House, Cornwall, new house (c.1821)
- Orchardleigh House, Somerset, design for remodelling the house (pre-1821)
- St Michael's Church, Marbury, Cheshire restoration (1821)
- Sidney Sussex College, Cambridge alterations and additions (1821)
- Tissington Hall, Derbyshire, design for alterations (1821)
- Tottenham House, Wiltshire, alterations and additions (1821)
- San Souci, Dorset, conservatory (c.1822)
- Whiteley Wood Hall, Yorkshire, additions (c.1822) demolished
- 1 Cavendish Square, London, proposed alterations (1823)
- Gothic House, Bad Homburg, attributed to him by Friedrich Lotz (1823)
- The White House, Charmouth Dorset
- Windsor Castle additions, Windsor, Berkshire (1823–40): Roof of grand entrance (1827), roof of St. George's Gateway (1829), King George IV gateway (1838), South Turret on South Terrace (1834), St. George's Hall (c.1827), Queen's Throne Room (1834), Brunswick Tower (1825–34), Chester Tower (1834), Clarence and Victoria Towers (1834), Cornwall Tower (1827), Dining Room Tower (1824), King George IV Tower (1832), Lancaster Tower (1825), Library Tower (1825–26), Octagon Tower (1826), South-East Tower (1829), York Tower (1826), Round Tower (1828–40), North Corridor and Front (1826), the Waterloo Chamber (1830–31), private apartments (1823–32), Royal Stable and Riding House (1839), Entrance Porch to Royal Pews, St. George's Chapel, Restoration of Garter Chapter House (now Albert Memorial Chapel), in Home Park, Windsor:
- Adelaide Cottage (1830–1), Gardener's Cottage, Gate Lodge (post 1830);
- Cumberland Lodge, additions (c.1828), Fishing Pavilion (1825);
- Fort Belvedere, Surrey, additions (1827);
- Royal Lodge, additions (1823–30);
- Royal Chapel of All Saints (1825),
- Base for the George III statue on Snow Hill (1829);
- Virginia Water Temple of Augustus, created using ancient Roman architectural fragments from Leptis Magna (1826–29), Bridge (1825);
- Chillingham Castle, Northumberland, alterations and new lodge (c.1824)
- House, Hastings, alterations (c.1824)
- Hengrave Hall, Suffolk, proposed alterations (c.1824)
- Lilleshall Hall, Shropshire, new house (c.1824)
- Bedford Lodge, Campden Hill, London, alterations and additions (c.1824)
- 74 Grosvenor Square, London, alterations (c.1824) demolished
- Renishaw Hall, Derbyshire, plans for a new service wing (c.1824)
- Somerhill, Kent, alterations (c.1824)
- Yester House, Haddingtonshire, gamekeeper's lodge (c.1824)
- Oakley Park, Duffolk, design for rebuilding the house (c.1825), demolished 1922-23
- 2 Cavendish Square, London, proposed alterations (1825)
- Golden Grove, Carmarthenshire, new house (1826–31)
- Holly Grove Lodge, Highgate, London, proposed alterations (1826)
- Welbeck Abbey, Nottinghamshire, consulted about alterations (1826)
- Wilton House, Wiltshire, proposed alterations (1826)
- Eastbury House, Surrey, additions (pre-1830)
- Palace of Westminster, London consulted about improvements (1831) & (1833)
- Designs for Altenstein Palace near Bad Liebenstein in Thuringia, Germany Bernhard II, Duke of Saxe-Meiningen(1833–34)
- St. James's Palace, London, various plans for alterations none executed (1831–35)
- Kensington Palace, London, alterations (1832) & (1839)
- Stackpole Court, Pembrokeshire, new bridge (1835)
- Cobham Hall, Kent, attributed, alterations to house (c.1835)
- Shobdon Court, Shobdon, Herefordshire, alterations (1835) demolished
- Lexham Hall, Norfolk, additions (c.1836)
- Cadland House, Hampshire, remodelling (1836)
- Royal Botanic Gardens, Kew, King William's Temple (1836) also proposals to build a palm house and alterations to Kew Palace
- House, Bushy Park for Queen Adelaide, (c.1837)
- Design for a villa at Meiningen, Germany for Bernhard II, Duke of Saxe-Meiningen (1837)
- Consulted about the building of Landsberg Castle at Meiningen in Thuringia Bernhard II, Duke of Saxe-Meiningen (1837)
- Drumlanrig Castle, Dumfries, alterations (1840)

== Gallery of architectural work ==
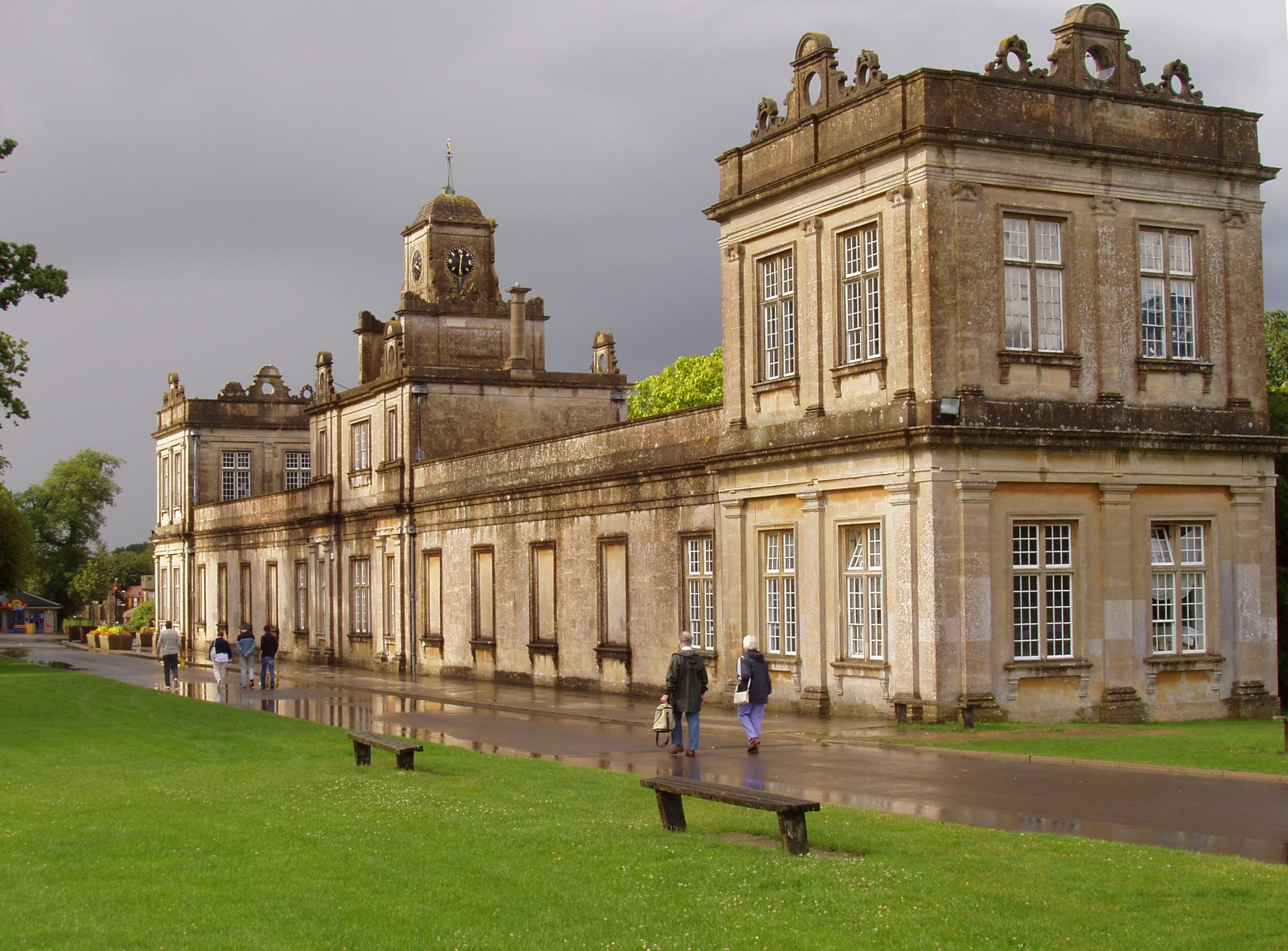
Stables, Longleat, Wiltshire (1806–13)

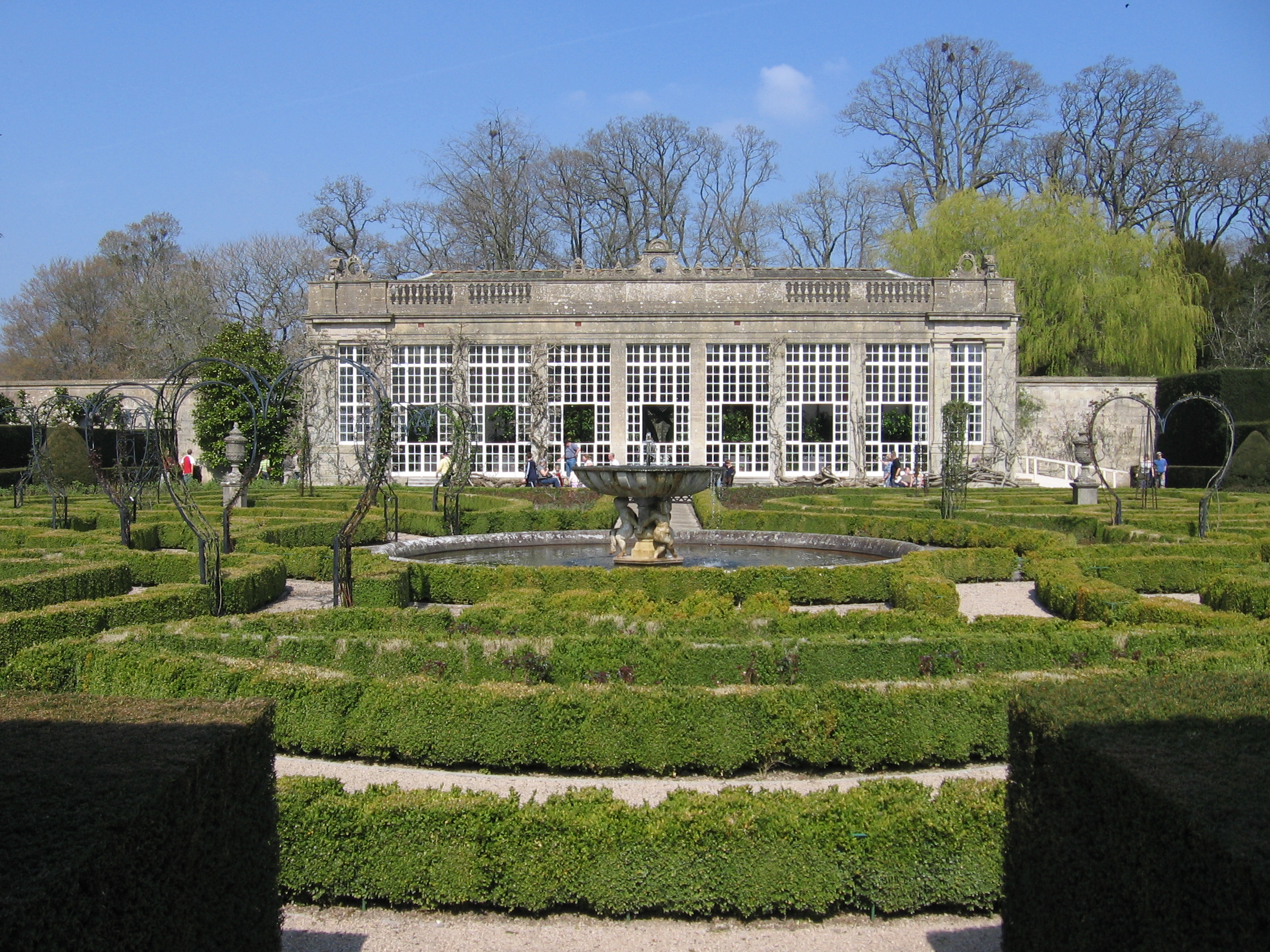
The Orangery, Longleat, Wiltshire (1806–13)

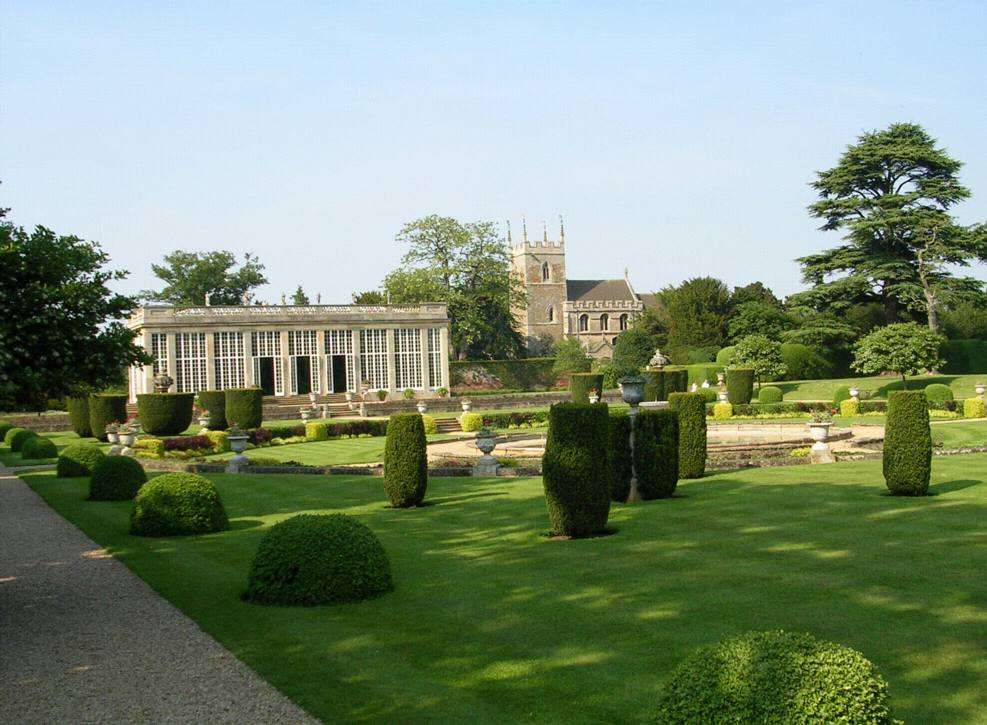
Orangery, Belton House, Lincolnshire (c.1810)

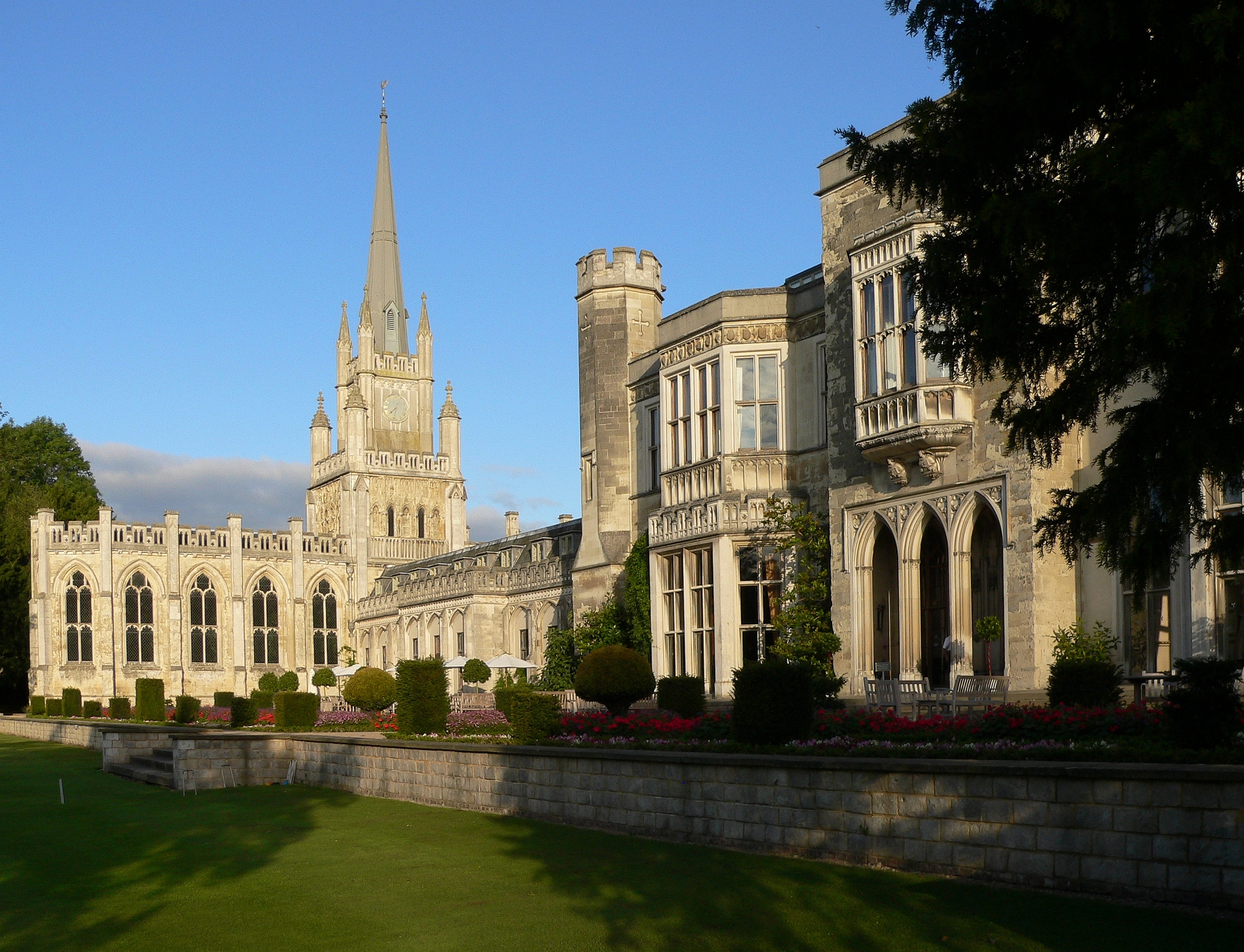
Completion of Ashridge House, Hertfordshire, after the architect, his uncle James Wyatt died, (c.1814-17)

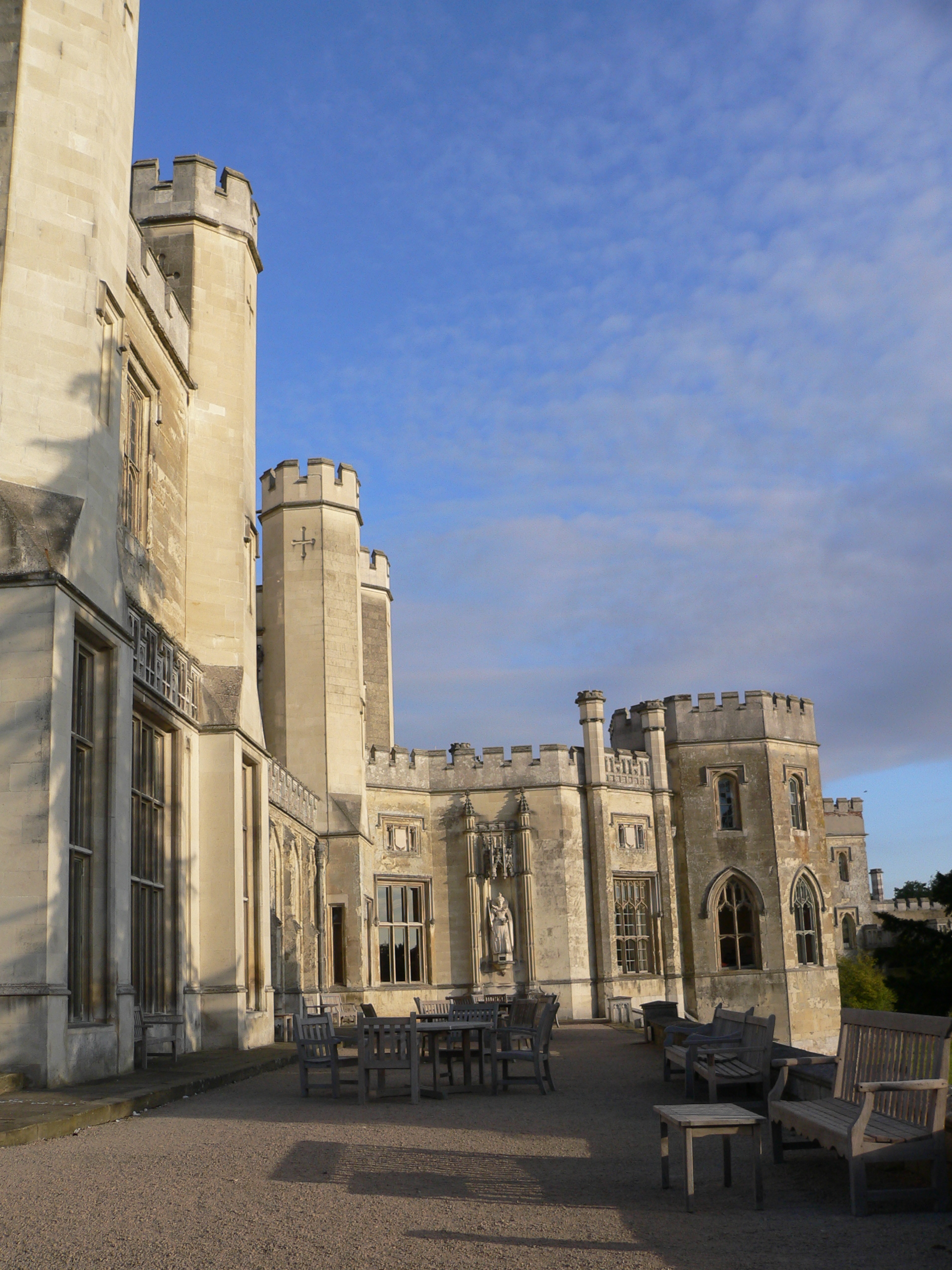
Ashridge House, Hertfordshire, wing on right by Wyatville,

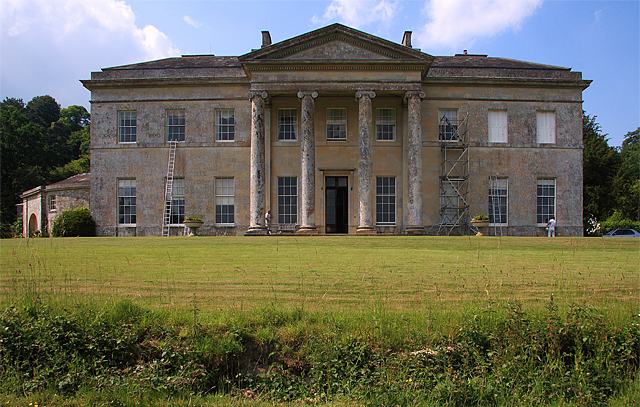
South front, Phillips House, Dinton, Wiltshire (1814–17)

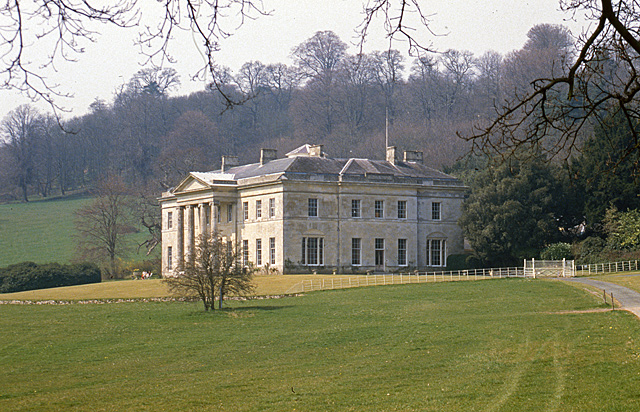
From the south-east, Phillips House, Dinton, Wiltshire (1814–17)

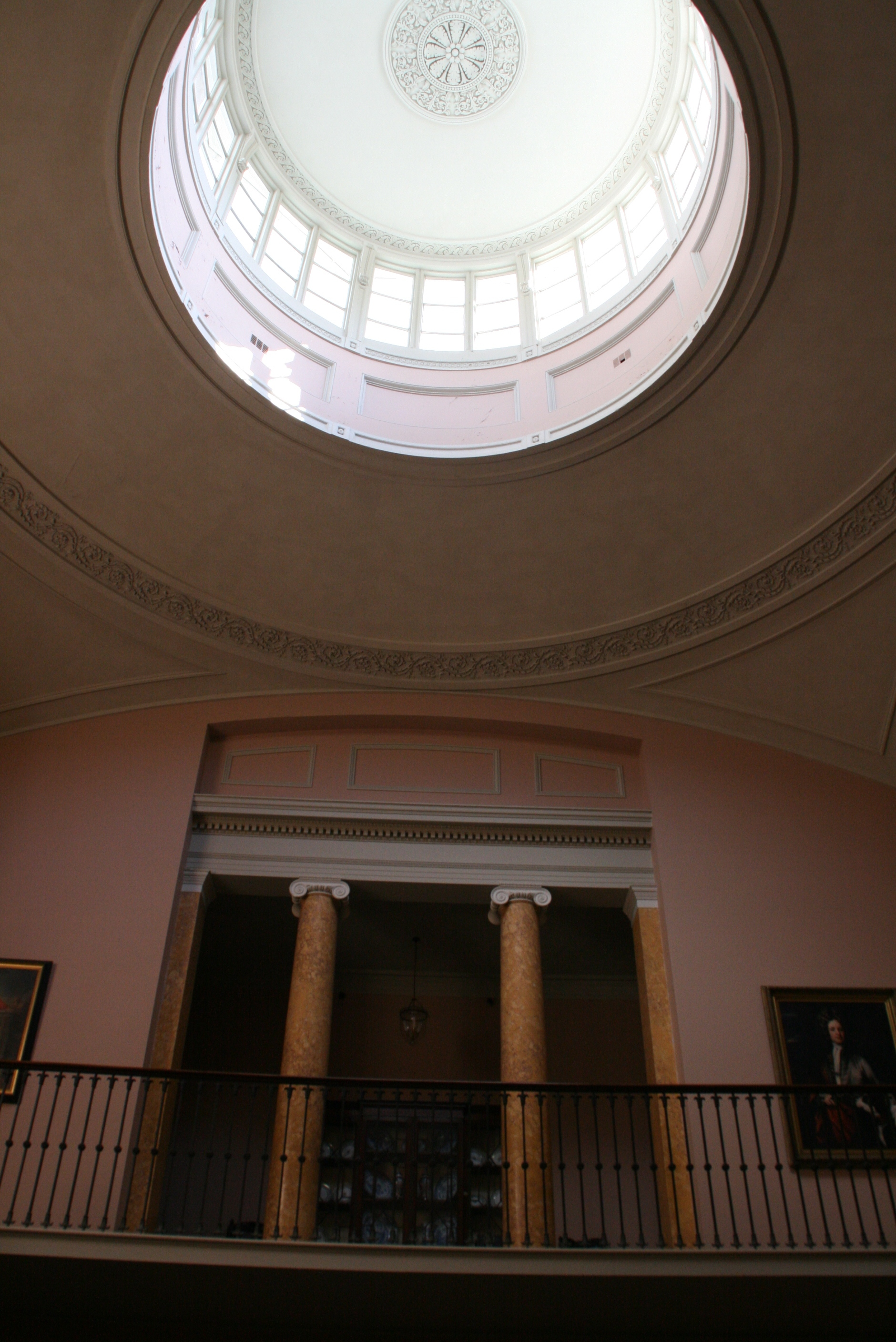
Great Hall, Phillips House, Dinton, Wiltshire (1814–17)

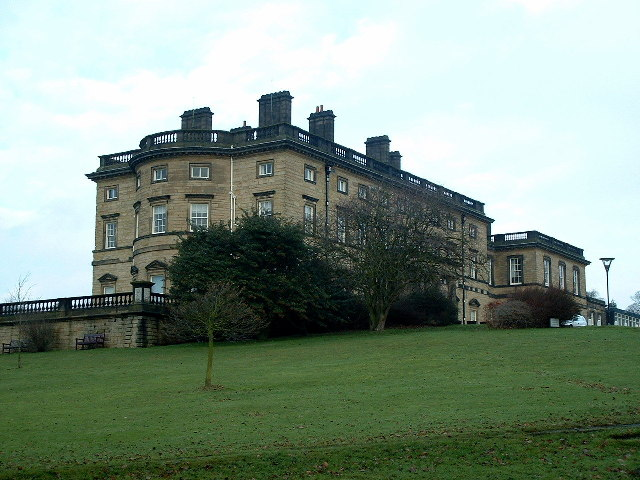
Bretton Hall, Yorkshire remodelled (c.1815)

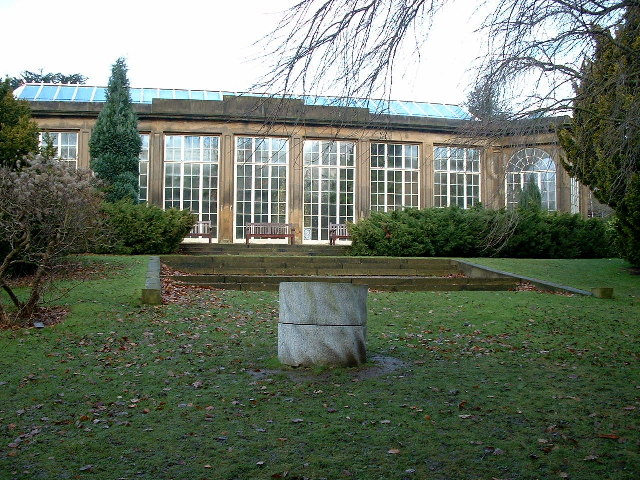
Camellia House, Bretton Hall, Yorkshire (c.1815)

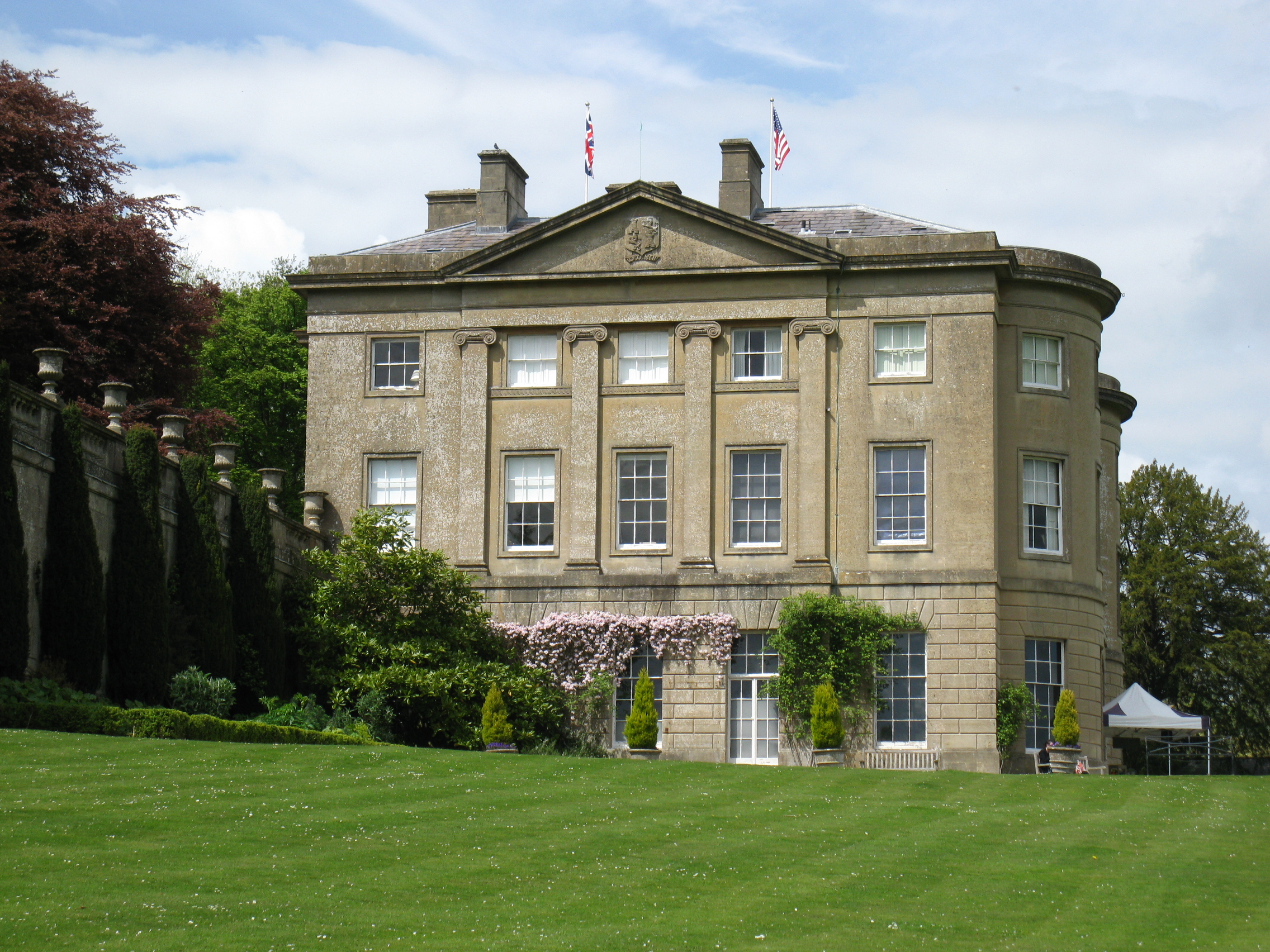
Claverton Manor, Near Bath, Somerset (1820)

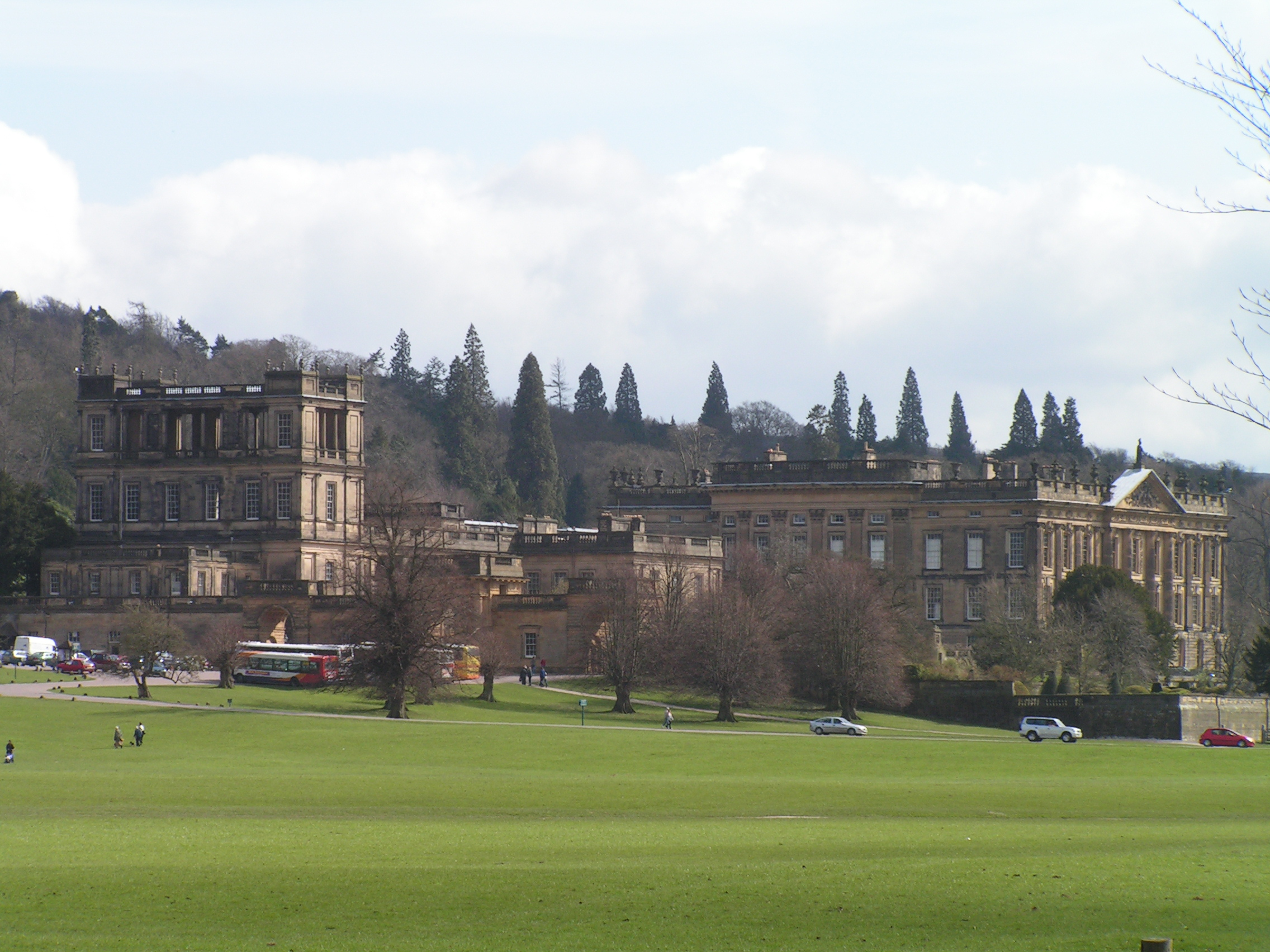
North wing (on left), Chatsworth House, Derbyshire (1820–41)

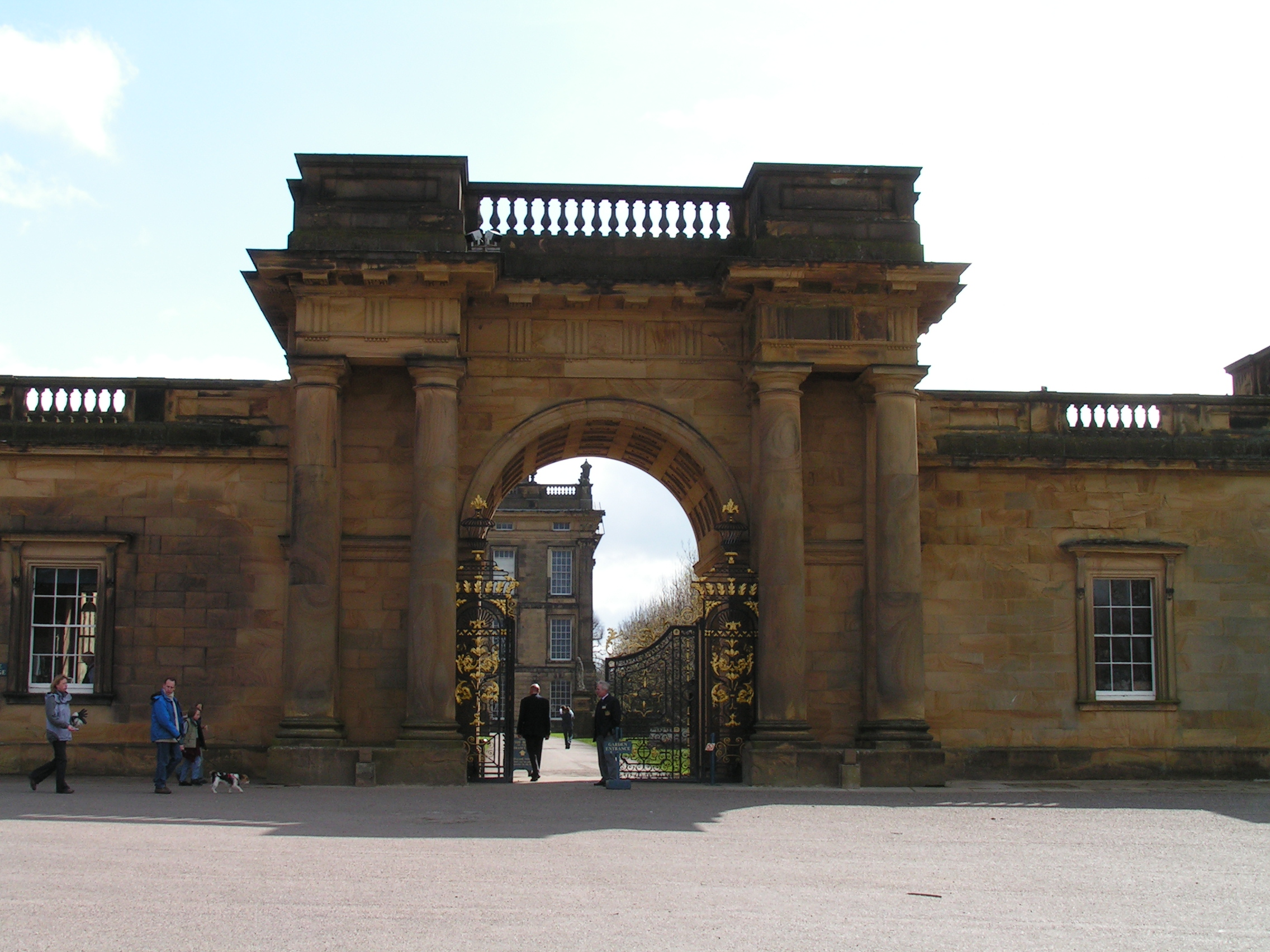
Entrance Arch, Chatsworth House, Derbyshire (1820–41)

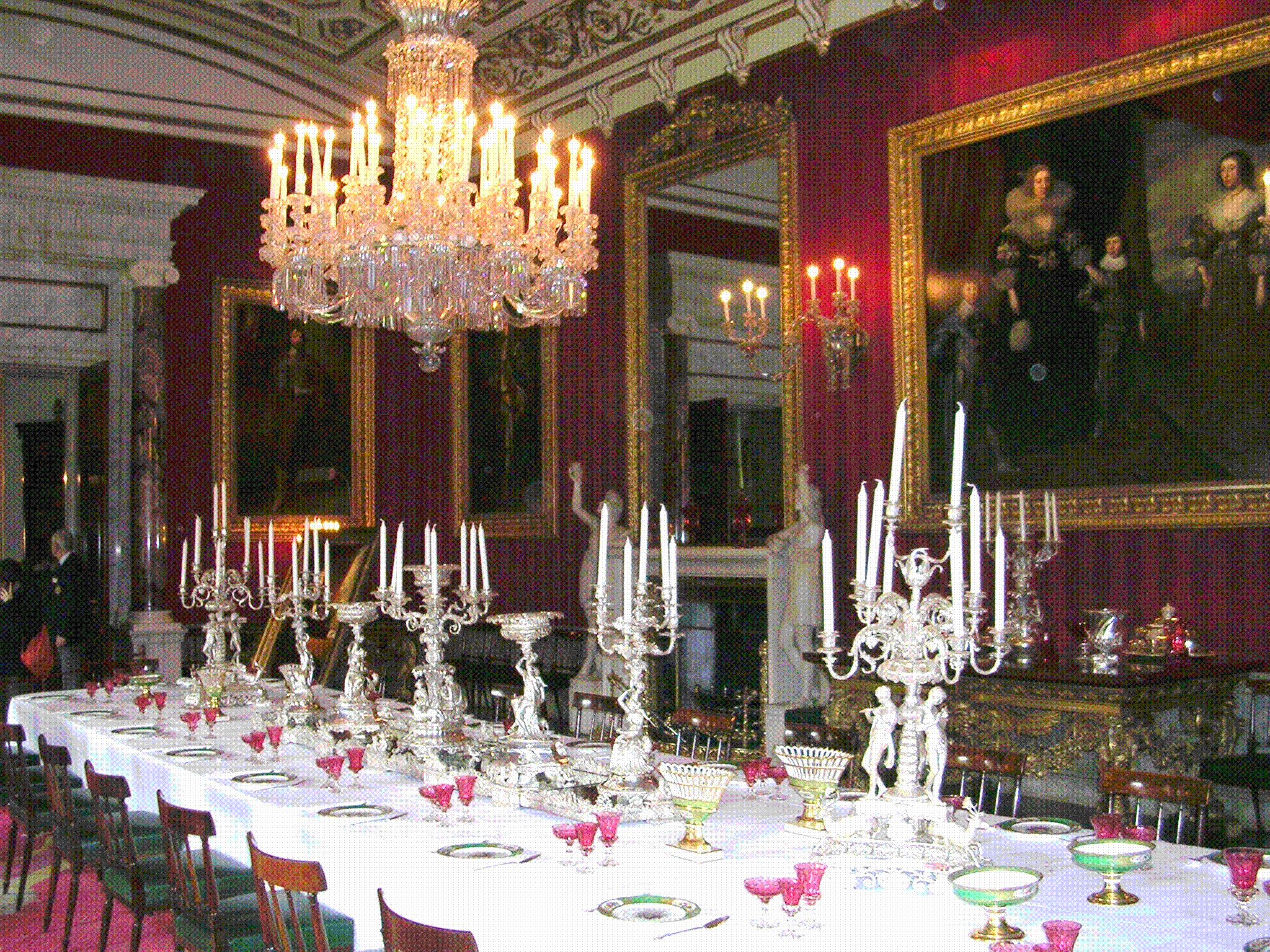
Great Dining Room, Chatsworth House, Derbyshire (1820–41)

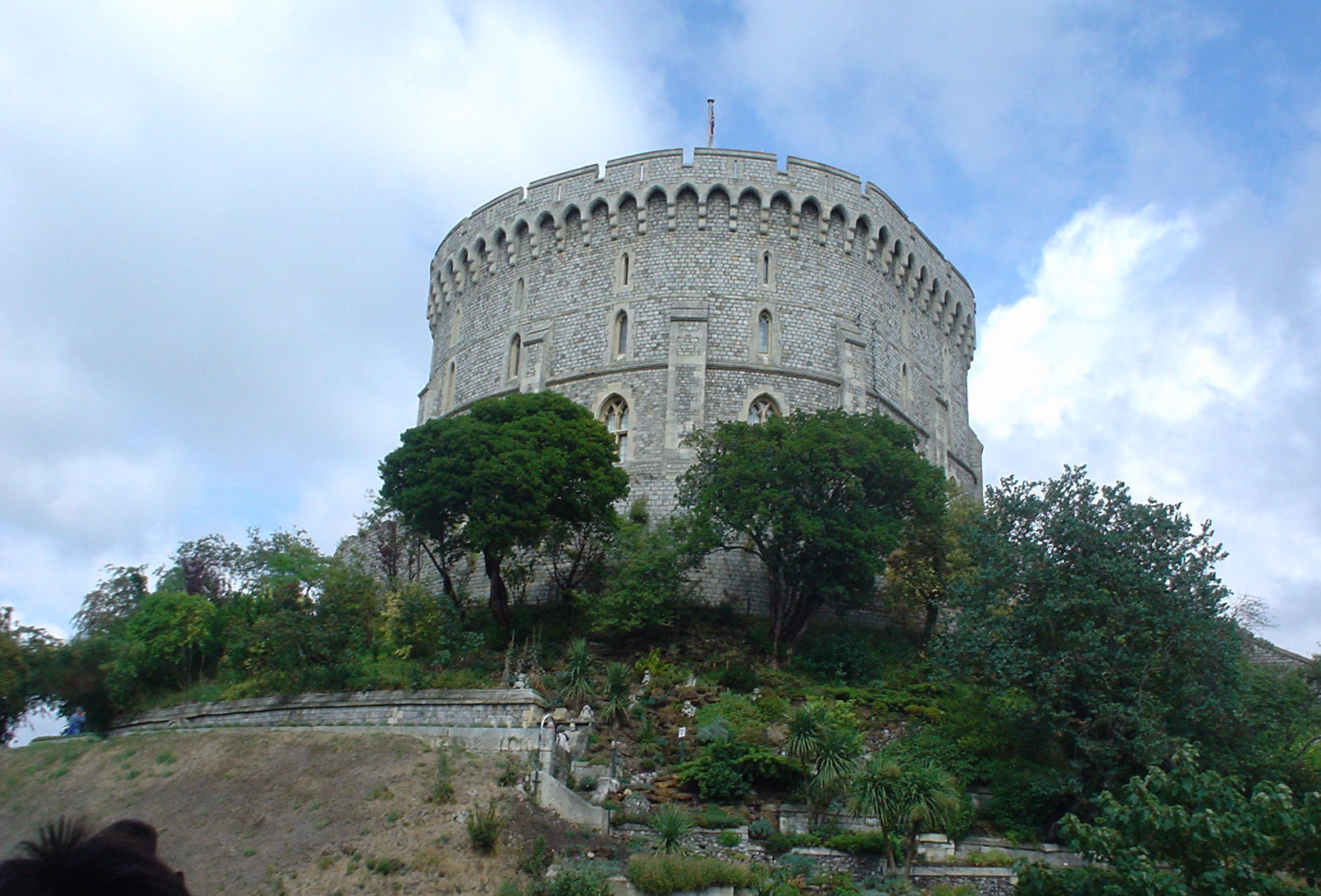
Round Tower, Windsor Castle, Berkshire, doubled in height by Wyatville, (1824-1840)

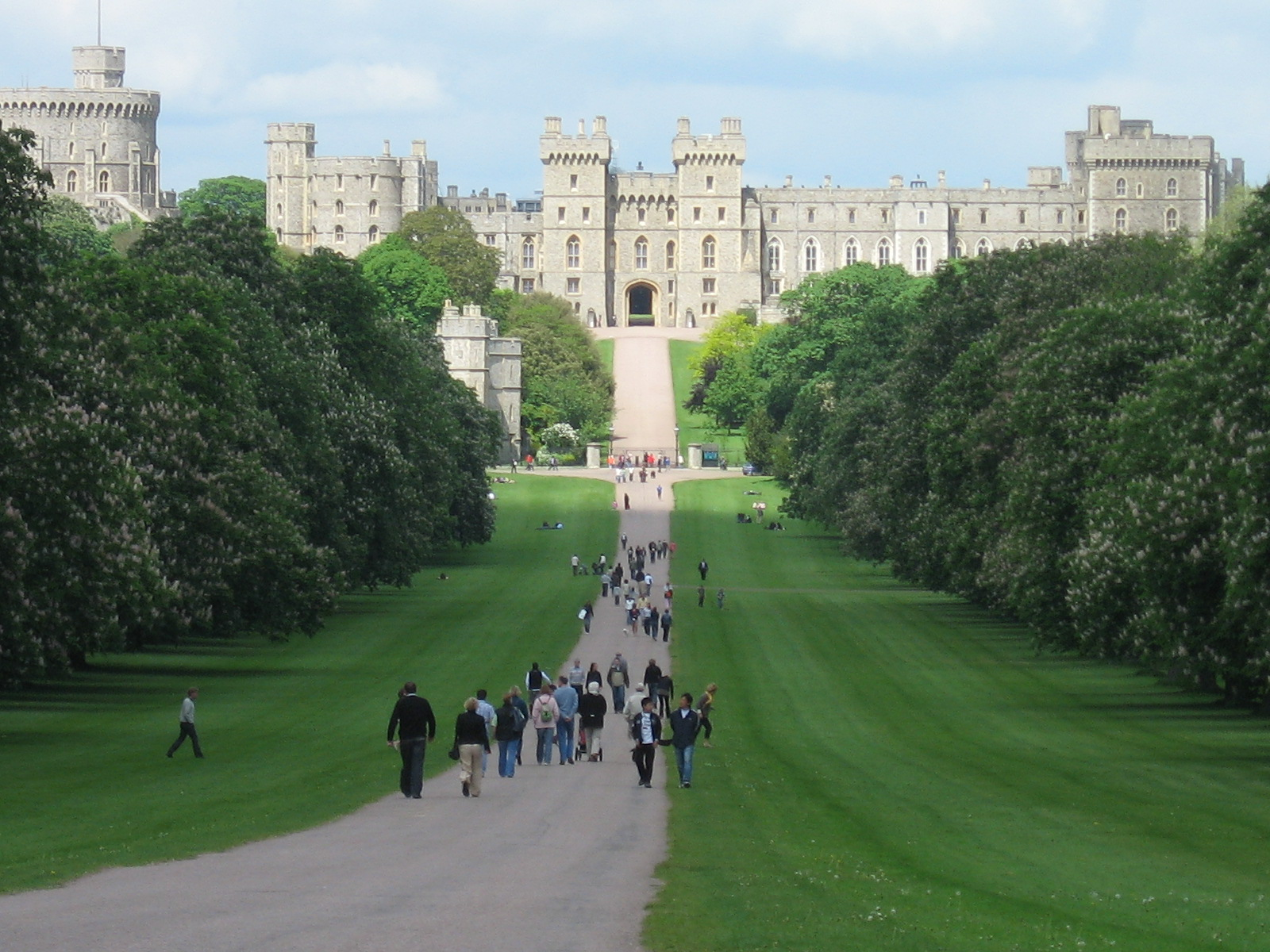
South facade including King George IV gateway, Windsor Castle, Berkshire, as rebuilt by Wyatville (1824-1840)

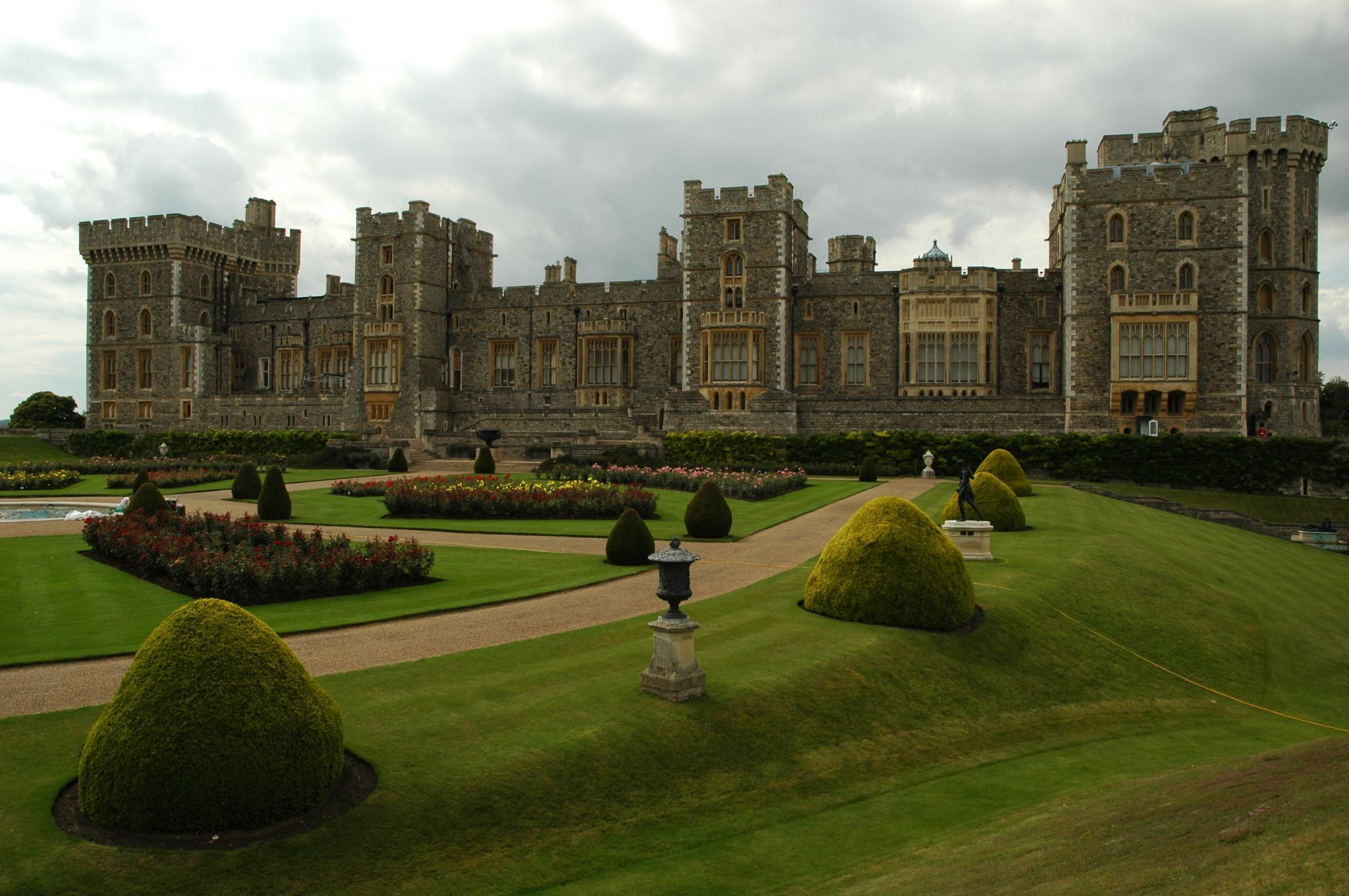
East facade, Windsor Castle, Berkshire, as rebuilt by Wyatville (1824-1840)

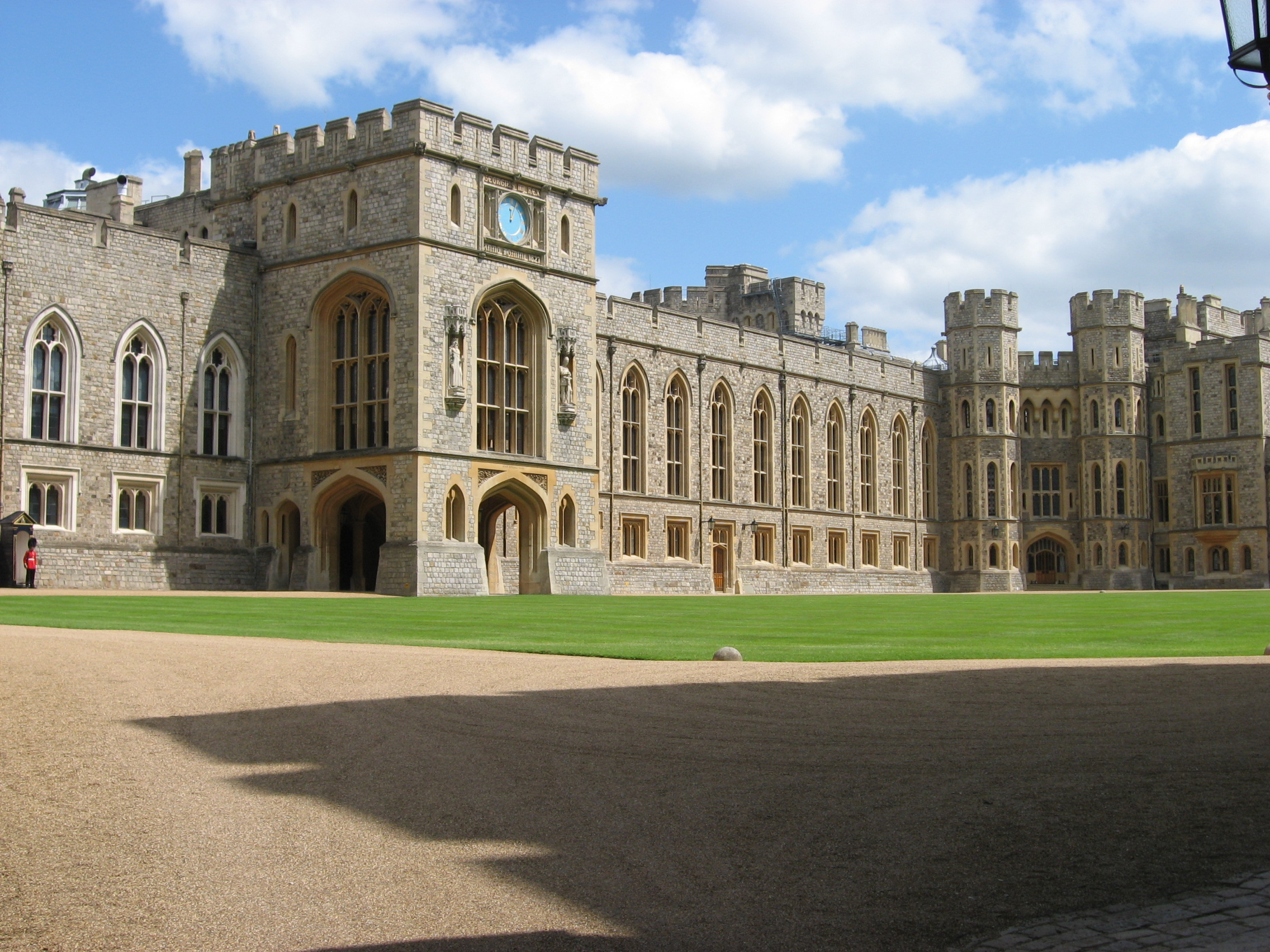
Upper Ward, Windsor Castle, Berkshire, as rebuilt by Wyatville (1824-1840)

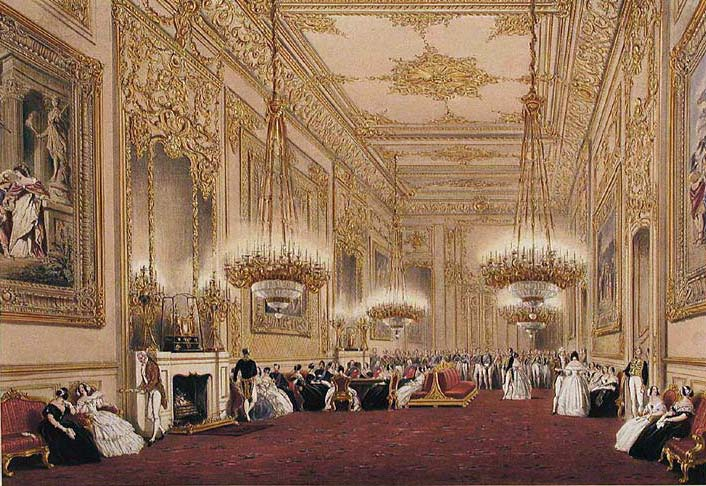
State Reception Room, Windsor Castle, as rebuilt by Wyatville (1824-1840)

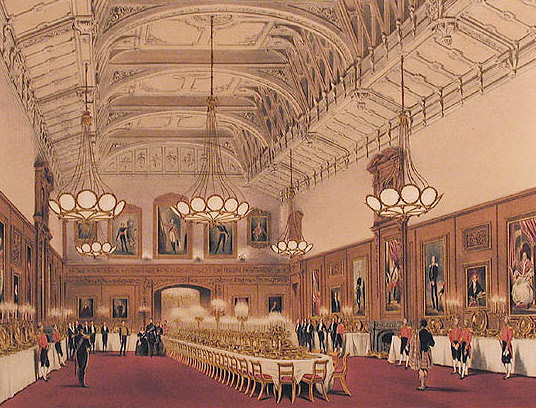
Waterloo Chamber, Windsor Castle, created by Wyatville (1824-1840)

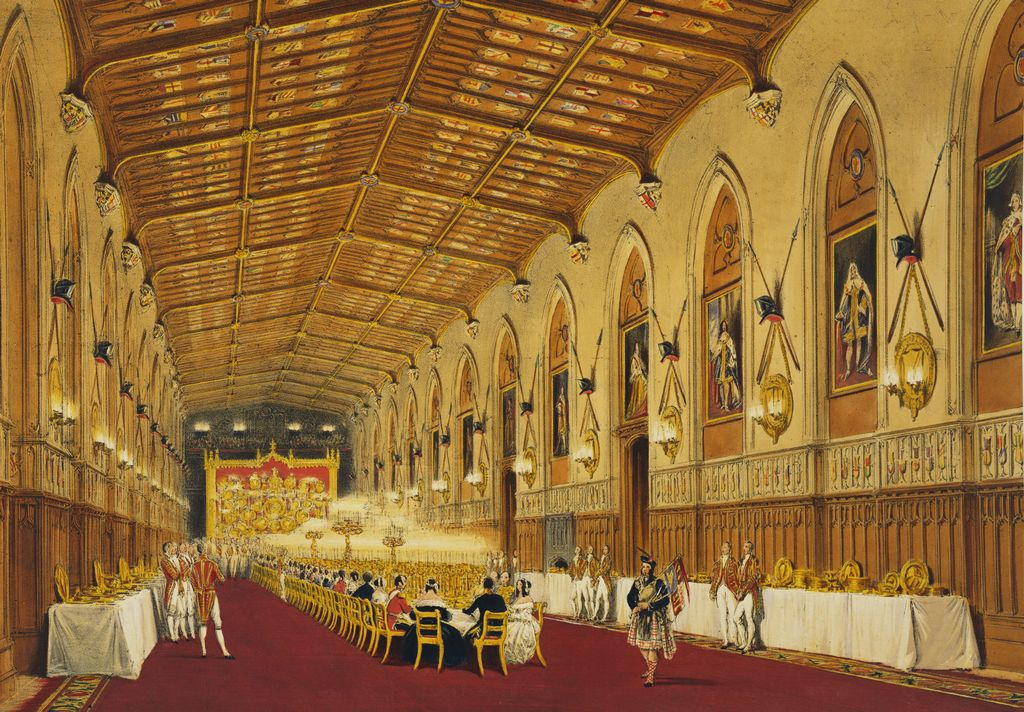
St. George's Hall, Windsor Castle, created by Wyatville (1824-1840) (damaged in 1992 fire and partially redesigned)

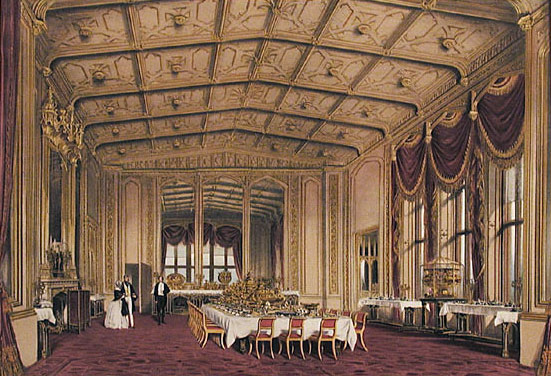
Dining Room, Windsor Castle, created by Wyatville (1824-1840)

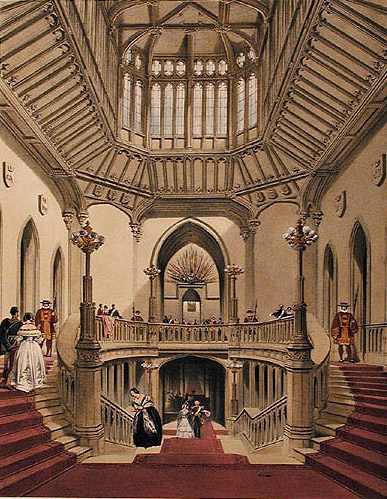
Grand Staircase, Windsor Castle, created by Wyatville (1824-1840) later rebuilt by Anthony Salvin

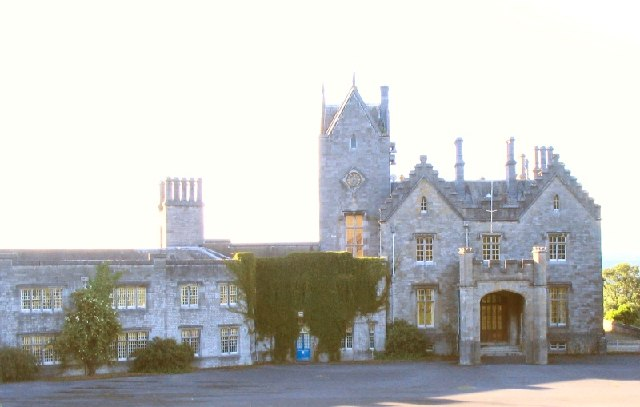
Golden Grove, (Gelli Aur) (1826–31)

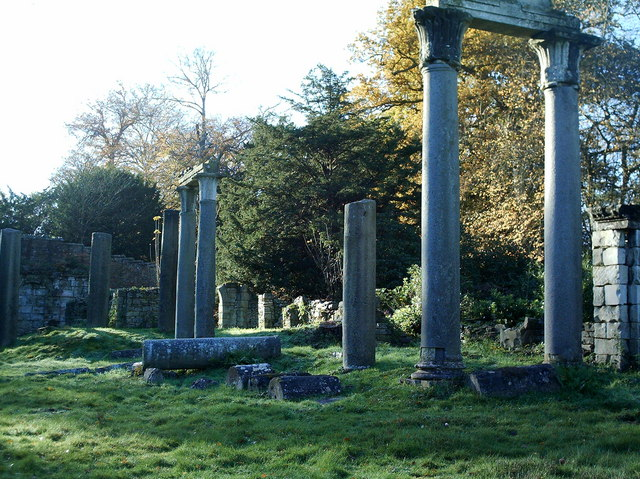
Ruins at Virginia Water, 'Temple of Augustus' (1826)

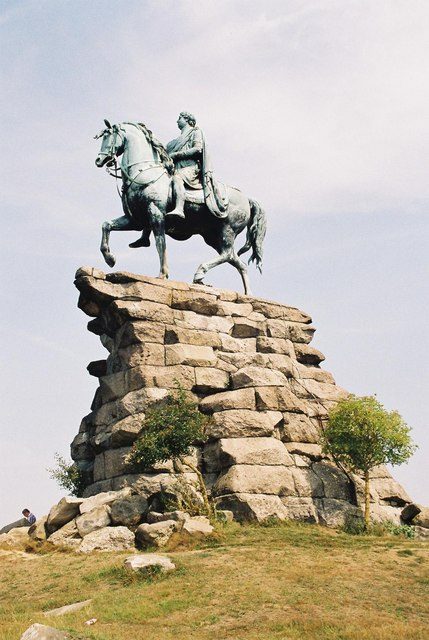
Statue Base, for the George III statue, Snow Hill, Windsor Great Park (1829)

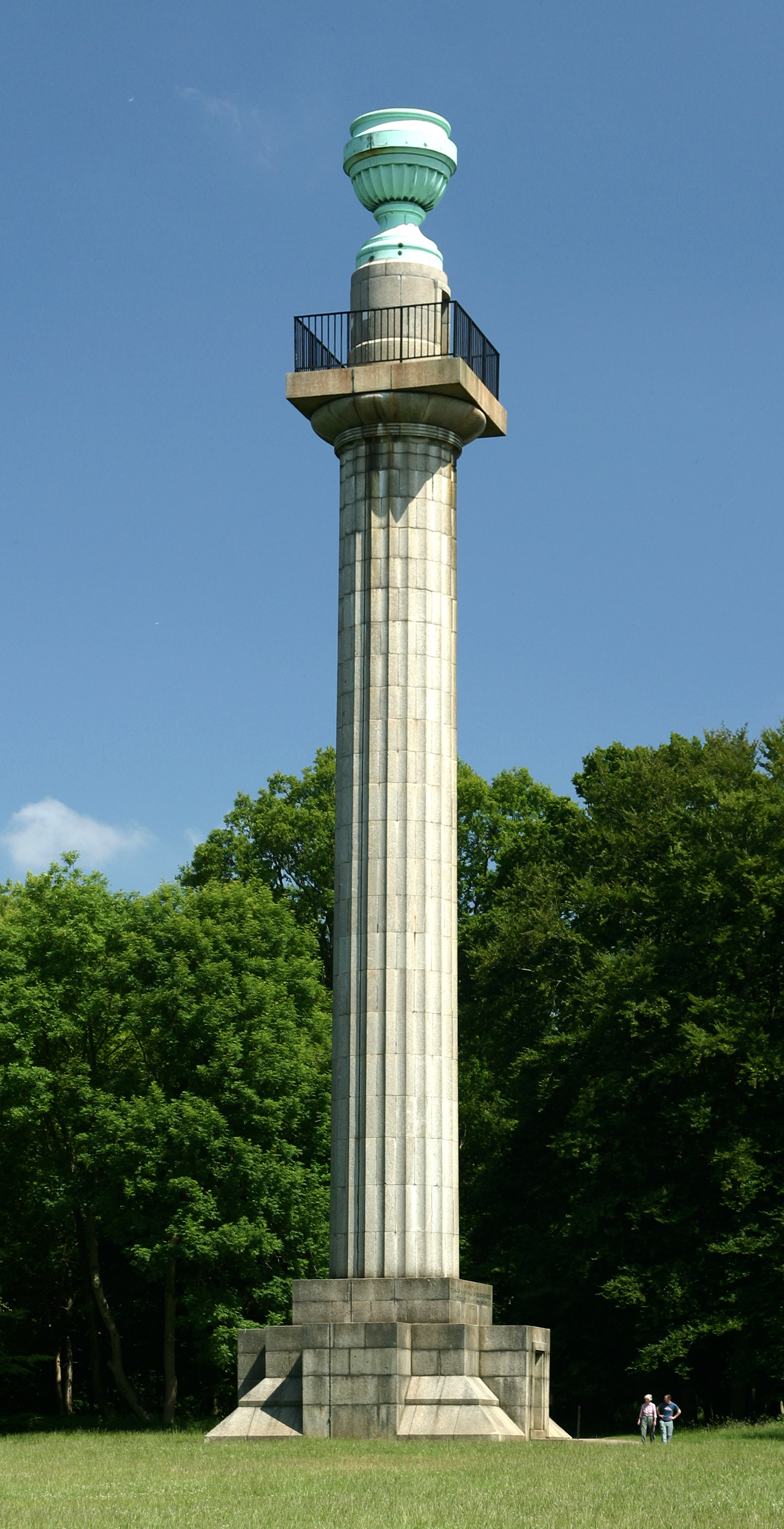
Bridgewater Monument, Ashridge, Hertfordshire (1831–32)

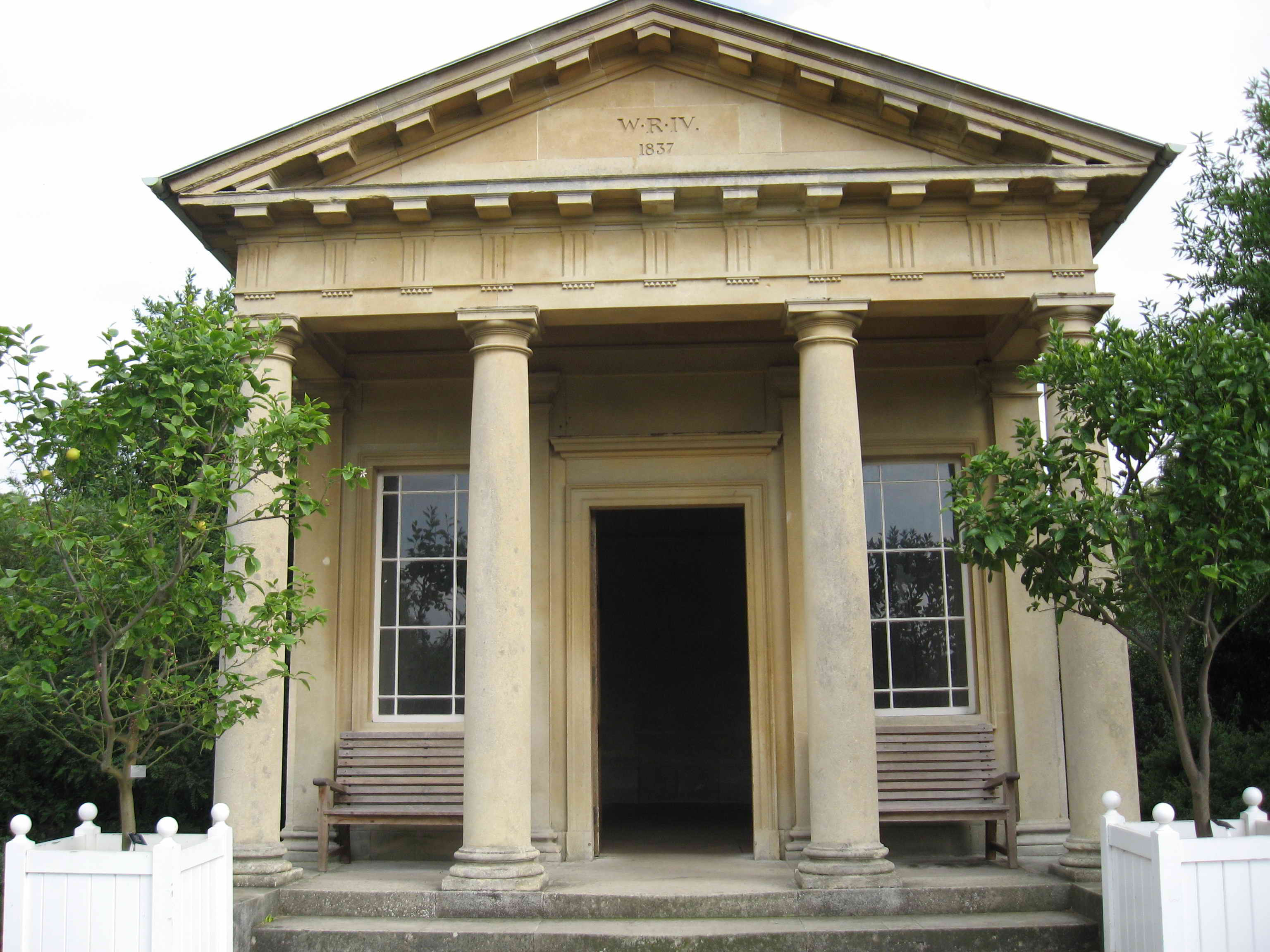
King William IV Temple, Kew Gardens, London (1837)

== See also ==
- Wyatts, an architectural dynasty
