= Schweina =

Village in Thuringia, Germany

- Ortsteil of Bad Liebenstein
- Coat of arms
- Interactive map of Schweina
- Location within Germany Location within Thuringia
- Coordinates: 50°49′40″N 10°20′19″E
- Country: Germany
- State: Thuringia
- District: Wartburgkreis
- Town: Bad Liebenstein

Area
  - Total: 16.4 km^{2} (6.3 sq mi)
- Elevation: 305 m (1,001 ft)

Population (2011-12-31)
  - Total: 2,946
  - Density: 180/km^{2} (465/sq mi)
- Time zone: UTC+01:00 (CET)
  - Summer (DST): UTC+02:00 (CEST)
- Postal codes: 36448
- Dialling codes: 036961
- Vehicle registration: WAK
- Website: www.schweina.de

Schweina (German pronunciation: [ˈʃvaɪna]) is a village and a former municipality in the Wartburgkreis district of Thuringia, Germany. Since 31 December 2012, it is part of the town Bad Liebenstein.

== Demographics ==
Historical population
Year	Pop.	±%
1996	3,181	—
2001	3,154	−0.8%
2006	3,038	−3.7%
2011	2,900	−4.5%
Source: "Thüringer Landesamt für Statistik" (in German).
