= Portrait of Jeffry Wyatville =

Painting by Thomas Lawrence

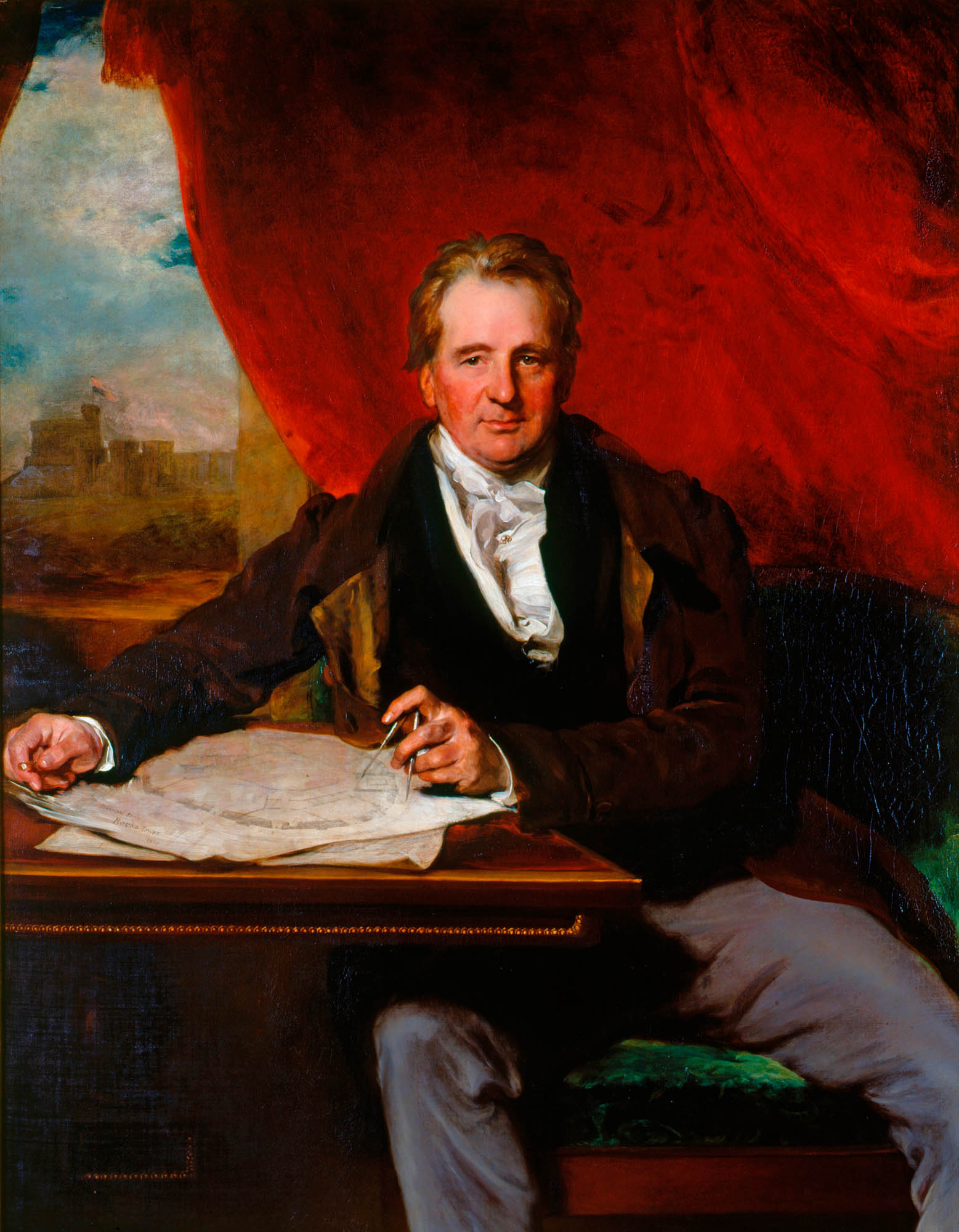
- Artist: Thomas Lawrence
- Year: c. 1829
- Medium: Oil on canvas, portrait painting
- Dimensions: 144 cm × 112.6 cm (57 in × 44.3 in)
- Location: Royal Collection, Windsor Castle
- Owner: George IV
- Collection: Royal Collection
- Accession no.: RCIN 406994

Portrait of Jeffry Wyatville is an oil on canvas portrait painting by the British artist Thomas Lawrence depicting the architect Jeffrey Wyattville. It was created c. 1829

== History and description ==
The Derbyshire-born Wyatville was responsible for the extensive refurbishment of Windsor Castle for George IV, one of the major public projects of his reign. Wyatville is shown holding design plans of the rebuilding with the castle visible in the background. Lawrence, the greatest portraitist of the Regency era, received a three hundred guinea commission from George IV in 1825 to produce the painting. Lawrence was customarily slow in producing the large number of commissions he received and the finished work wasn't completed for several years and remained in his studio at his death in January 1830. In style it resembles the work of Lawrence's predecessor as President of the Royal Academy Joshua Reynolds such as his Portrait of Joseph Banks.

The painting remains in the Royal Collection at Windsor. An engraving was produced from it in 1834 by John Henry Robinson. Wyatville was responsible for constructing the Waterloo Chamber at Windsor which features a large number of portraits produced by Lawrence of the European leaders responsible for the defeat of Napoleon.

== Bibliography ==
- Herrmann, Luke. Nineteenth Century British Painting. Charles de la Mare, 2000.
- Levey, Michael. Sir Thomas Lawrence. Yale University Press, 2005.
- Linstrum, Derek. Sir Jeffry Wyatville: Architect to the King. Clarendon Press, 1972.
