= Tollgate House, Mitchel Troy =

Tollgate House
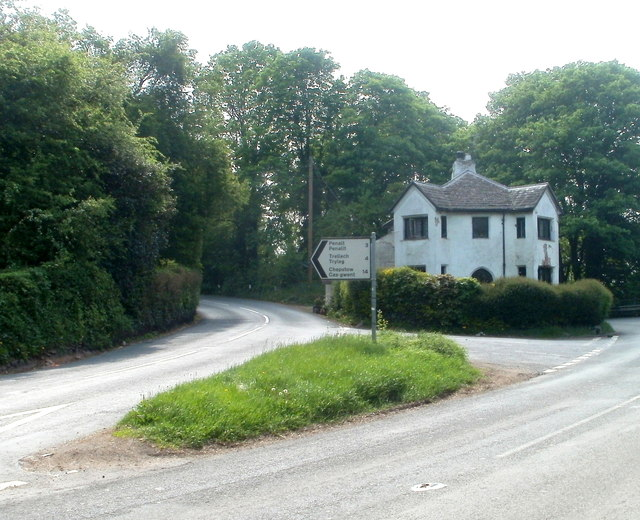
- On the road from Monmouth to Mitchel Troy

- Location within Monmouthshire
- 51.8°N 2.719°W
- Type: Tollhouse
- Location: Mitchel Troy, Monmouthshire

History
- Built: c.1810

Site notes
- Architect: Jeffry Wyatville
- Architectural style: Neoclassical
- Governing body: Privately owned

Listed Building – Grade II
- Official name: Tollgate House aka Monmouth Toll House
- Designated: 23 April 1992
- Reference no.: 2867

Tollgate House, near the village of Mitchel Troy in Monmouthshire, Wales, is a tollhouse dating from the early 19th century. Attributed to the architect Sir Jeffry Wyatville, it is a Grade II listed building.

== History and description ==
In the Early modern period, before responsibility for the construction and maintenance of roads was transferred to local government, roadbuilding was undertaken as a private commercial activity by turnpike trusts. The trusts built the roads, under agreements made with local landowners and with the sanction of private Acts of Parliament, and recouped the construction and maintenance costs by the raising of tolls. To enable the collection of the tolls, tollhouses were built, frequently at the junctions of roads, which provided accommodation for a toll-keeper and were designed to enable them to man gates placed at the junctions at which tolls were collected from users of the roads.

The 18th and 19th centuries saw a huge expansion in the construction of toll roads in Wales and elsewhere, as the demands of industry and commerce drove a need for greatly improved communication routes. South Wales experienced particularly rapid expansion, due to the burgeoning coal and iron industries. The toll road from Monmouth into South Wales was constructed in the early 19th century and Tollgate House at Mitchel Troy, the first tollhouse on the road out of the town, was built in around 1810. The design is attributed to Sir Jeffry Wyatville by Cadw, although the Royal Commission on the Ancient and Historical Monuments of Wales (RCAHMW) goes no further than to note that Wyatville did design toll houses along the route. (Note: Sir Jeffry Wyatville was one of the most successful architects of the first half of the 19th century. Much favoured by George IV, Wyatville’s most notable work was the reconstruction of Windsor Castle.)

The building is a rough rectangle, with three bays giving easy sight out to the approaching roads. Unusually, it is of two-storeys, as tollhouses were more commonly single-storey structures. It is built of local whitewashed stone. Tollgate House is a Grade II listed building.
