= Bad Liebenstein =

- Town
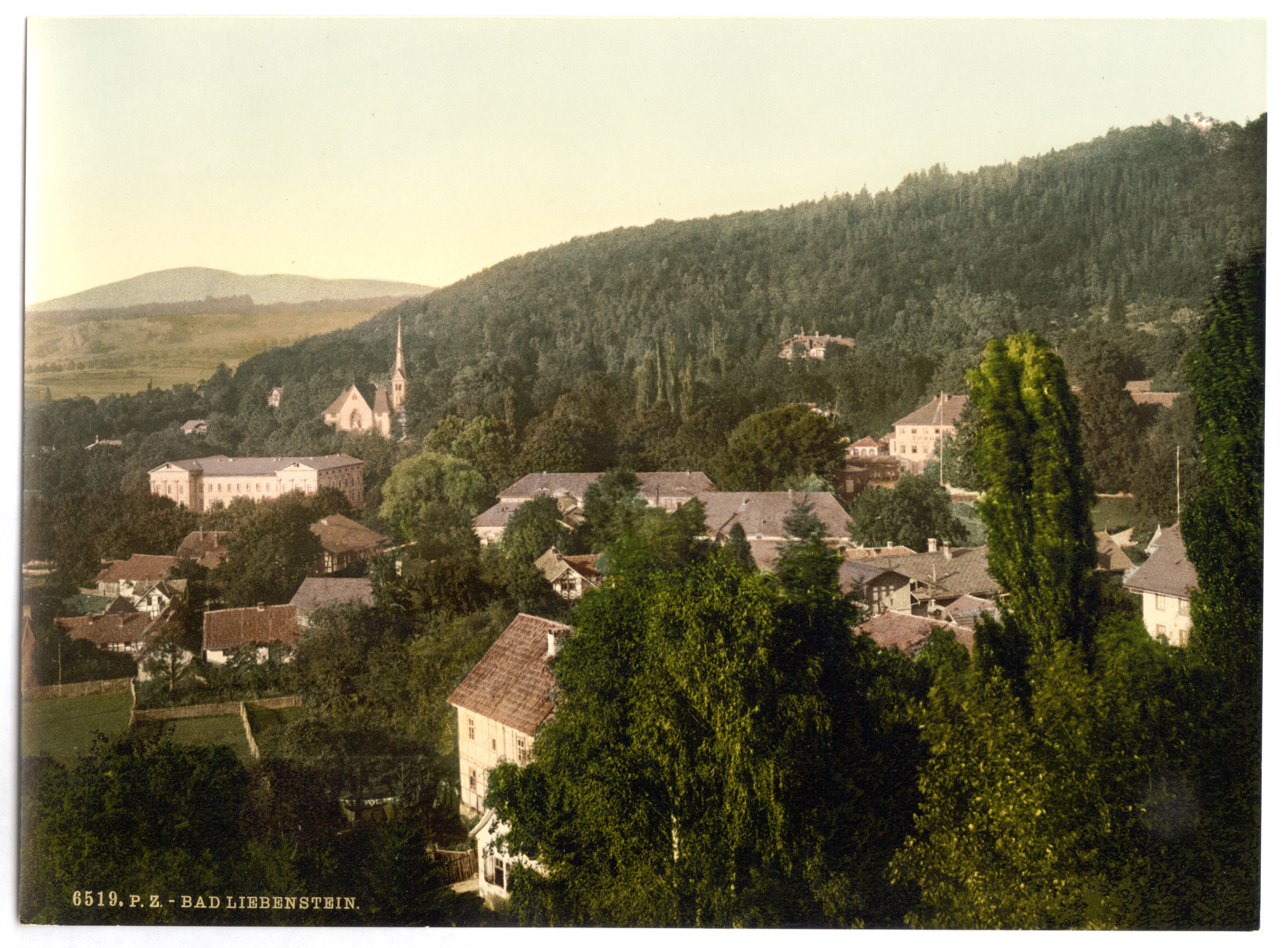
- Bad Liebenstein 1900

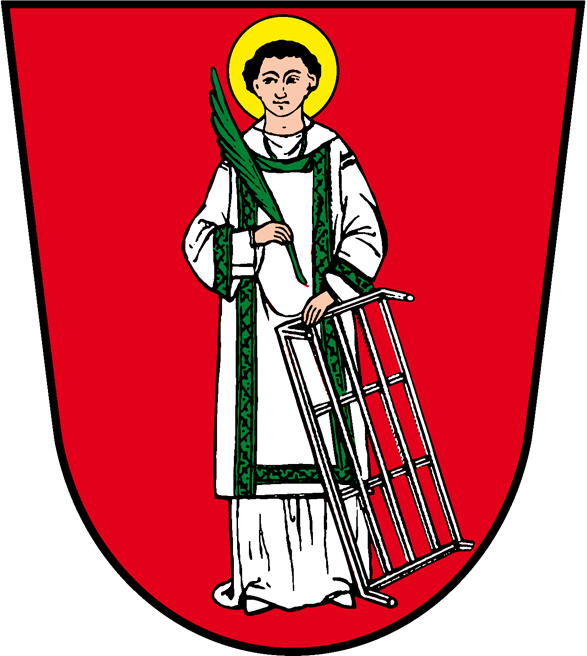
- Coat of arms

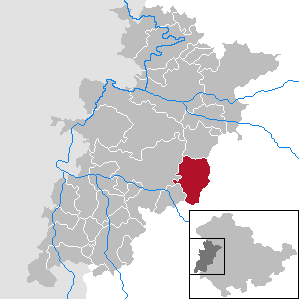
- Location of Bad Liebenstein within Wartburgkreis district
- Interactive map of Bad Liebenstein
- Location within Germany Location within Thuringia
- Coordinates: 50°48′52″N 10°21′15″E
- Country: Germany
- State: Thuringia
- District: Wartburgkreis

Government
  - Mayor (2019–25): Michael Brodführer (CDU)

Area
  - Total: 48.81 km^{2} (18.85 sq mi)
- Elevation: 344 m (1,129 ft)

Population (2025-12-31)
  - Total: 7,662
  - Density: 157.0/km^{2} (406.6/sq mi)
- Time zone: UTC+01:00 (CET)
  - Summer (DST): UTC+02:00 (CEST)
- Postal codes: 36448
- Dialling codes: 036961
- Vehicle registration: WAK
- Website: www.bad-liebenstein.de

Bad Liebenstein (German pronunciation: [baːt ˈliːbn̩ˌʃtaɪn]) is a municipality and spa town in Wartburgkreis district of Thuringia, Germany.

== Geography ==
=== Location ===
Bad Liebenstein is situated 25 km north of Meiningen, and 18 km south of Eisenach. It is located in the Mittelgebirge Thuringian Forest.

=== Neighbouring communities ===
Since the amalgamation of 1 January 2013 the town has bordered on the following communities (clockwise from the southwest): Barchfeld-Immelborn, Moorgrund and Ruhla in Wartburgkreis, Brotterode-Trusetal and Breitungen/Werra in Schmalkalden-Meiningen district.

== History ==
Schloss Altenstein, the summer residence of the Dukes of Saxe-Meiningen, is located within the municipality.

Since 1600 guests have come to recover. Famous spa guests included Queen Adelaide of Saxe-Meiningen, Albert Schweitzer, Gerhart Hauptmann, Franz Liszt and Charlotte von Stein.
