= Gustav Adolf, Cardinal Prince of Hohenlohe-Schillingsfürst =

German prince and cardinal (1823–1896)

His Eminence Gustav Adolf von Hohenlohe-Schillingsfürst
- Archpriest of the Basilica di Santa Maria Maggiore
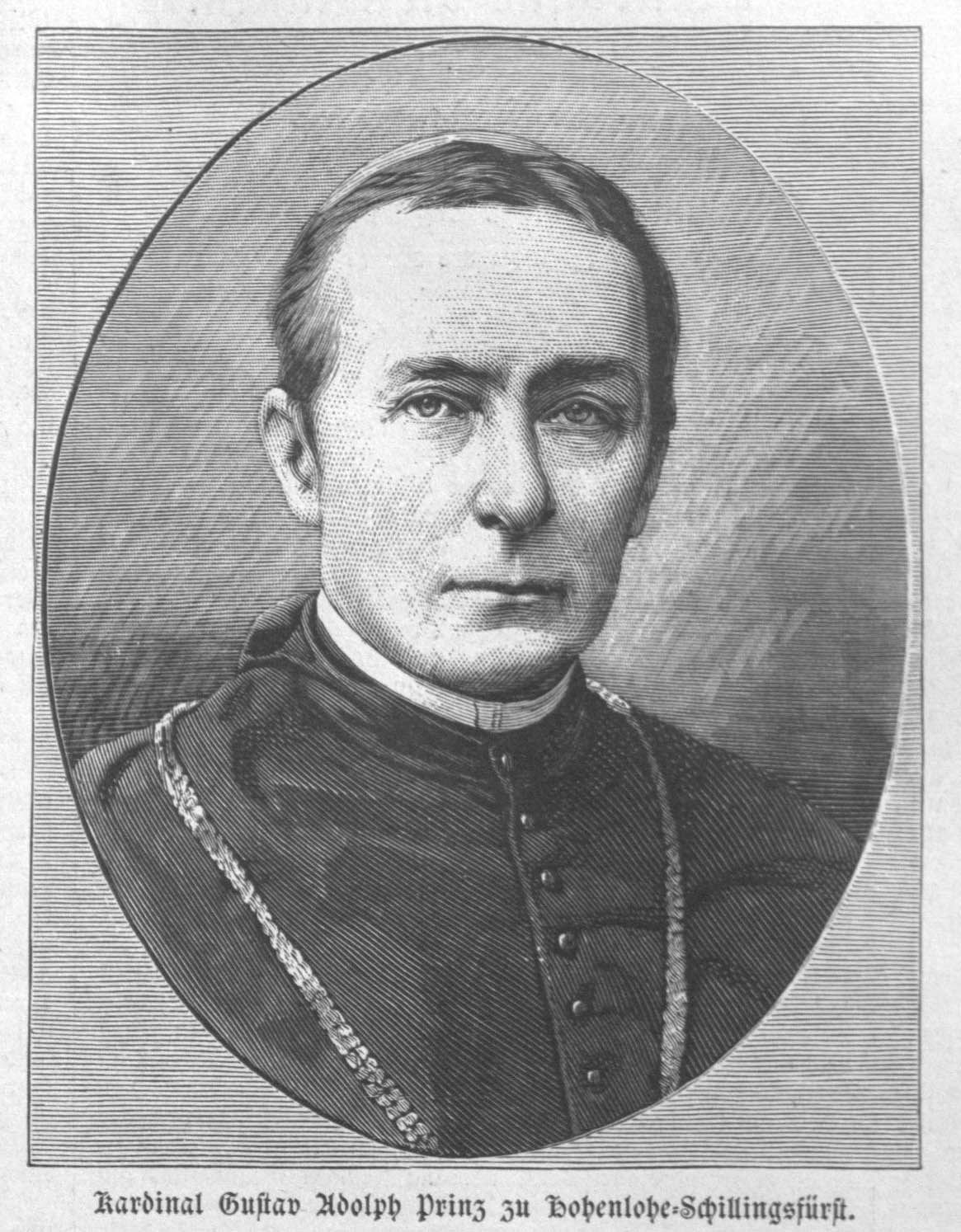
- Portrait - Adolfo Müller-Ury (1882–1884).
- Church: Roman Catholic Church
- Appointed: 15 July 1878
- Term ended: 30 October 1896
- Predecessor: Costantino Patrizi Naro
- Successor: Vincenzo Vannutelli
- Other post: Cardinal-Priest of San Lorenzo in Lucina (1895–96)
- Previous posts: Titular Archbishop of Edessa (1857–66); Cardinal-Priest of Santa Maria in Traspontina (1866–79); Cardinal-Bishop of Albano (1879–83); Cardinal-Priest of San Callisto (1884–95)

Orders
- Ordination: January 1849 by Luigi Maria Parisio
- Consecration: 22 November 1857 by Pope Pius IX
- Created cardinal: 22 June 1866 by Pope Pius IX
- Rank: Cardinal-Priest (1866–79; 1884–96); Cardinal-Bishop (1879–84)

Personal details
- Born: Gustav Adolf von Hohenlohe-Schillingsfürst; 26 February 1823 Rotenburg an der Fulda, German Confederation
- Died: 30 October 1896 (aged 73) Rome, Kingdom of Italy
- Buried: Teutonic Cemetery
- Parents: Franz Joseph von Hohenlohe-Schillingsfürst; Caroline Friederike Constanze von Hohenlohe-Langenburg
- Education: Pontifical Ecclesiastical Academy

Gustav Adolf, Cardinal Prince of Hohenlohe-Schillingfürst, (26 February 1823 – 30 October 1896) was a member of the Hohenlohe family of Germany, claiming descent from Eberhard, one of the early dukes of Franconia. He became a cardinal of the Catholic Church.

== Biography ==
Hohenlohe was born in Rotenburg an der Fulda, in the Electorate of Hesse, on 26 February 1823, the son of its ruler, Franz Joseph, 1st Prince of Hohenlohe-Schillingsfürst, and Princess Caroline Friederike Constanze of Hohenlohe-Langenburg. His father was a Catholic, while his mother was a Lutheran. In the standard compromise of the era, he and his brothers were raised in the faith of their father, while his sisters were raised in that of their mother. His brothers were:

- Victor Herzog von Ratibor (1818-1893), officer in the Prussian army, liberal politician in the Prussian- and in the German Parliament.
- Chlodwig zu Hohenlohe-Schillingsfürst (1819-1901), liberal politician, Prime Minister of Bavaria, Chancellor of the German Empire.
- Konstantin zu Hohenlohe-Schillingsfürst (1828-1896), son-in-law of Princess Carolyne zu Sayn-Wittgenstein, Erster Obersthofmeister of Emperor Franz Joseph I. of Austria.

Hohenlohe studied humanities at the gymnasiums of Ansbach and Erfürt; and studied law in Bonn. He commenced his theology courses at the Seminary of Breslau, and then in Münich. He entered the Pontifical Ecclesiastical Academy in Rome in 1846.

Hohenlohe took Catholic holy orders in 1849 and became in 1857 the titular bishop of Edessa in Mesopotamia and almoner to Pope Pius IX. He was appointed a cardinal in June 1866, with the titular church of Santa Maria in Traspontina.

Around 1850 Hohenlohe acquired the Villa d'Este in Tivoli and restored the dilapidated villa and the ruined and overgrown gardens. The Villa attracted artists. His portrait was apparently painted by the Swiss-born American artist Adolfo Müller-Ury (1862-1947) during the two years he spent studying in Italy 1882-1884, and was probably signed "Ad. Muller". Its present whereabouts is unknown.

In 1858, his cousin, the widowed Princess Katharina of Hohenlohe-Waldenburg-Schillingsfürst had entered the Convent of Sant'Ambrogio della Massima as a novice. After objecting to what she considered inappropriate practices, she became very ill. Convinced she was being poisoned, she managed to get word to the Cardinal, who immediately removed her from the convent and brought her the Villa d'Este to recover. There she was introduced to the Benedictine monk Maurus Wolter. The princess confided in the monk, who instructed her to report it to the Holy Office. This set in motion an investigation, during which a number of irregularities at the convent came to light.

After Rome was taken by the Italian army in September 1870, Hohenlohe returned to Germany. In 1872, during the Kulturkampf, Otto von Bismarck, Chancellor of the German Empire, appointed Hohenlohe as Ambassador to the Holy See, but his appointment was rejected by Pope Pius IX, possibly as a result of the open opposition he and his brothers had shown to the ultramontane position of that pope. Hohenlohe was considered a liberal, and had been critical of the infallibility dogma.

He returned to Rome in 1876 and subsequently gained the favor of Pope Leo XIII, and went on to spend the rest of his ecclesiastical career in Italy. In July 1878 he became the archpriest of the Basilica of Santa Maria Maggiore. In May 1879 he was named the Cardinal-Bishop of Albano, which office he resigned in December 1883. A year later he was given the title of Cardinal-Priest of the Church of San Callisto, until 1895, when his title was transferred to that of San Lorenzo in Lucina.

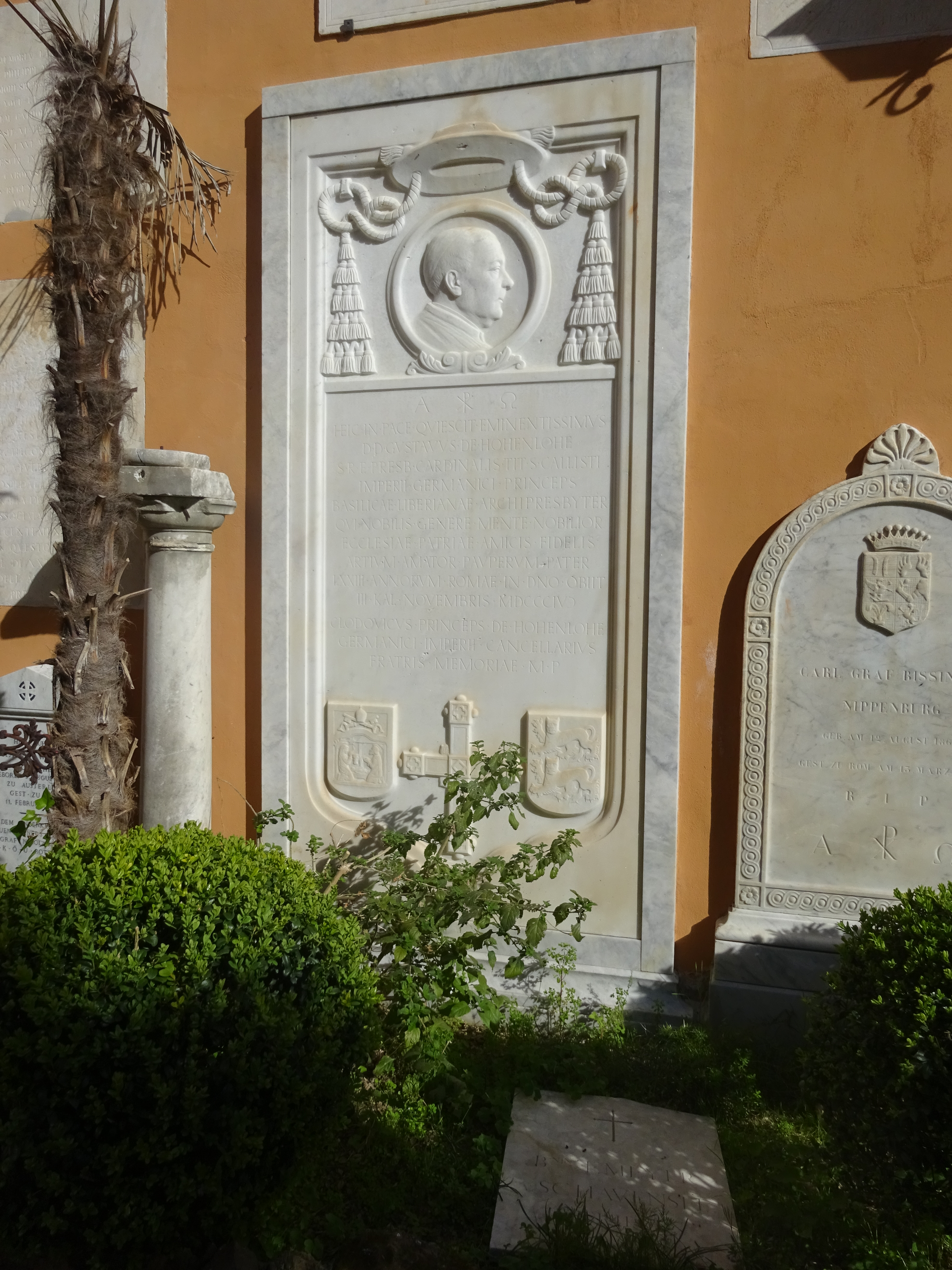
Grabstätte des Kurienkardinals Gustav Adolf zu Hohenlohe-Schillingsfürst

Hohenlohe died in Rome on 30 October 1896 and was buried in the Teutonic Cemetery, reserved to German nationals serving the institutions of the Church in Rome.

The American sculptor and Rome resident Moses Jacob Ezekiel, a friend, created a bust of Hohenlohe.

== Hohenlohe and Liszt ==
In October 1861 Hohenlohe was instrumental in the prevention of the marriage of Franz Liszt with Princess Carolyne zu Sayn-Wittgenstein in the San Carlo al Corso in Rome. Thus he averted disinheritance of his brother Konstantin, husband of Carolyne’s daughter Marie. Nevertheless, he became friendly with Liszt: in April 1865 he conveyed him the tonsure, in July the Minor Orders. Besides he granted Liszt hospitality in his apartments in the Vatican, from April 1865 until June 1866 (his creation as a cardinal).

== Ancestry ==
Ancestors of Gustav Adolf, Cardinal Prince of Hohenlohe-Schillingsfürst

16. Philipp Ernst, 1st Prince of Hohenlohe-Waldenburg-Schillingsfürst
8. Karl Albrecht I, 2nd Prince of Hohenlohe-Waldenburg-Schillingsfürst
17. Countess Maria Anna of Oettingen-Wallerstein
4. Karl Albrecht II, 3rd Prince of Hohenlohe-Waldenburg-Schillingsfürst
18. Dominikus, Prince of Löwenstein-Wertheim-Rochefort
9. Princess Sophie of Löwenstein-Wertheim-Rochefort
19. Landgravine Christine of Hessen-Rheinfels-Rotenburg
2. Franz Joseph, 1st Prince of Hohenlohe-Schillingsfürst
20. Baron András Reviczky de Revisnye
10. Baron Johann Kazimir Reviczky de Revisnye
21. Julianna Nedeczky
5. Baroness Judith Reviczky de Revisnye
22. Baron Ádám Perényi de Perény
11. Baroness Rosalie Perényi de Perény
23. Erzsébet Fráter
1. Gustav Adolf, Prince of Hohenlohe-Schillingsfürst
24. Ludwig, 1st Prince of Hohenlohe-Langenburg
12. Christian Albrecht, 2nd Prince of Hohenlohe-Langenburg
25. Countess Eleonore of Nassau-Saarbrücken
6. Karl Ludwig, 3rd Prince of Hohenlohe-Langenburg
26. Friedrich Karl, Prince of Stolberg-Gedern
13. Countess Caroline of Stolberg-Gedern
27. Countess Luise of Nassau-Saarbrücken
3. Princess Constanze of Hohenlohe-Langenburg
28. Johann Karl, Count of Solms-Baruth
14. Johann Christian II, Count of Solms-Baruth
29. Countess Louise of Lippe-Biesterfeld
7. Countess Amalie Henriette of Solms-Baruth
30. Count Heinrich VI Reuss of Köstritz
15. Countess Friederike Reuss of Köstritz
31. Henrica Casado de Monteleone
