= Princess of Hohenlohe-Langenburg =

See Also:Prince of Hohenlohe-Langenburg

The former German county of Hohenlohe-Langenburg, located in present-day Baden-Württemberg, has had 10 princesses since 1764 when the title was created. The current princess is Saskia Binder, who has held the title since 2004.

== Princess of Hohenlohe-Langenburg ==
Picture	Name	Father	Birth	Marriage	Became Princess	Ceased to be Princess	Death	Spouse
	Eleonore of Nassau-Saarbrücken	Louis Crato, Count of Nassau-Saarbrücken (Nassau-Saarbrücken)	1 July 1707	25 January 1723	7 January 1764 husband created Prince	16 January 1765 husband's death	15 October 1769	Ludwig, later Baroness von Thielmann
	Caroline of Stolberg-Gedern	Friedrich Carl, Count of Stolberg-Gedern (Stolberg-Gedern)	27 June 1732	13 April 1761	16 January 1765 husband accession	4 July 1789 husband's death	28 May 1796	Christian Albrecht
	Amalie Henriette of Solms-Baruth	Johann Christian II, Count of Solms-Baruth (Solms-Baruth)	30 January 1768	30 January 1789	4 July 1789 husband accession	4 April 1825 husband's death	20 October 1847	Carl Ludwig
	Feodora of Leiningen	Emich Carl, 2nd Prince of Leiningen (Leiningen)	7 December 1807	18 February 1828		12 April 1860 husband's death	23 September 1872	Ernst I
	Leopoldine of Baden	Prince William of Baden (Baden)	22 February 1837	24 September 1862		23 December 1903		Hermann
	Alexandra of Edinburgh	Alfred, Duke of Saxe-Coburg and Gotha (Saxe-Coburg and Gotha)	1 September 1878	20 April 1896	9 March 1913 husband's accession	16 April 1942		Ernst II
	Margarita of Greece and Denmark	Prince Andrew of Greece and Denmark (Schleswig-Holstein-Sonderburg-Glücksburg)	18 April 1905	20 April 1931	11 December 1950 husband's accession	11 May 1960 husband's death	24 April 1981	Gottfried
	Charlotte of Croÿ	Alexander, Prince of Croÿ (Croÿ)	31 December 1938	16 July 1965		26 May 1990 divorce	Living	Kraft
	Irma Pospesch	Eugen Pospesch	19 June 1946	22 May 1992		16 March 2004 husband's death	Living	Kraft
	Saskia Binder	Hans Peter Binder	15 January 1973	13 September 2003	16 March 2004	Incumbent	Living	Philipp
