= Viktor I of Ratibor =

Victor I
- Duke of Ratibor, Prince of Corvey, Prince of Hohenlohe-Schillingsfürst
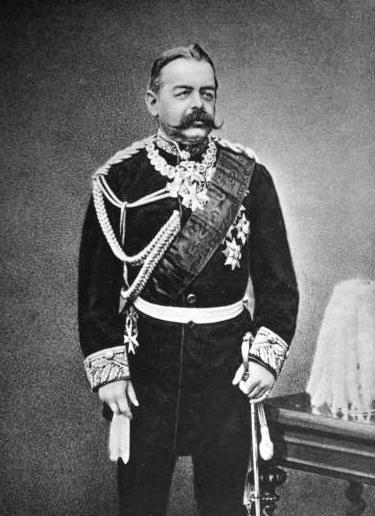
- Prince Victor c. 1885
- Born: 10 February 1818; Langenburg, Kingdom of Württemberg
- Died: 30 January 1893 (aged 74); Rauden palace, Kingdom of Prussia
- Spouse: Princess Amélie of Fürstenberg (m. 1845)
- Issue: Princess Amelia; Viktor II, Duke of Ratibor; Prince Franz; Princess Elisabeth; Prince Egon; Princess Marie; Prince Maximilian; Prince Ernst; Prince Karl Egon; Princess Margaret
Names
- German: Viktor Moritz Carl
- House: Hohenlohe-Schillingsfürst
- Father: Franz Joseph, 1st Prince of Hohenlohe-Schillingsfürst
- Mother: Princess Constanze of Hohenlohe-Langenburg
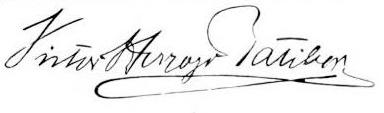
- Signature

Member of the Reichstag (German Empire)
- In office 1872–1890
- Constituency: Breslau 8

(North German Confederation)
- In office 1867–1871
- Constituency: Oppeln 2

Personal details
- Party: Free Conservative Party

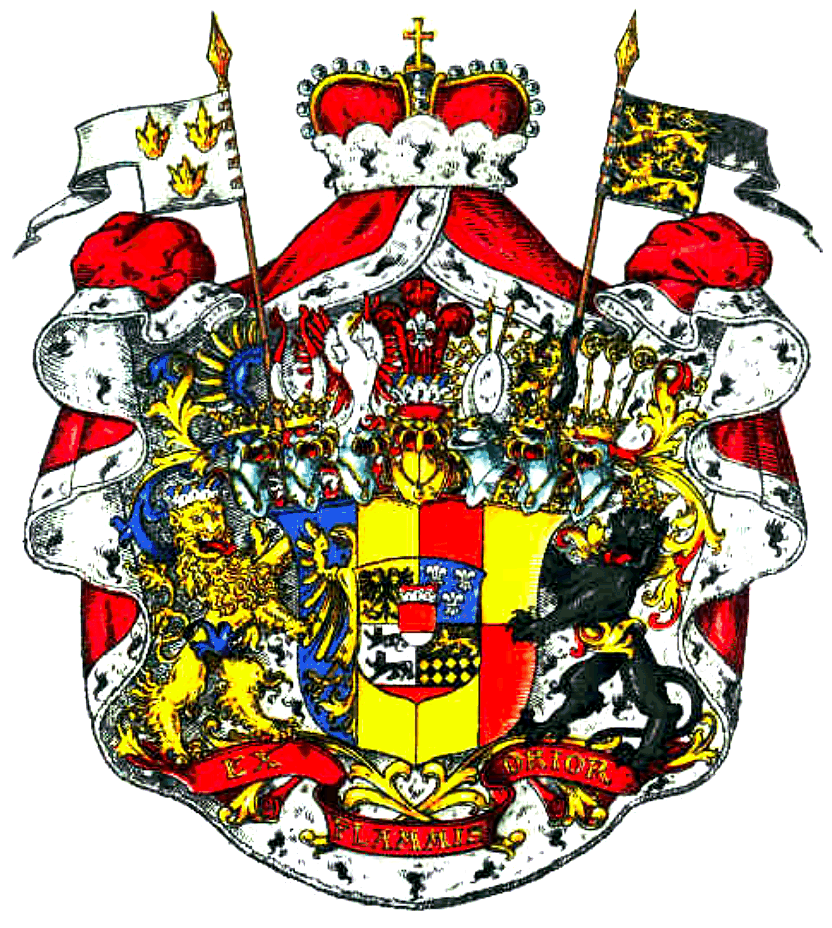
Arms of the Duke of Ratibor and Prince of Corvey

Victor I, Duke of Ratibor, Prince of Corvey, Prince of Hohenlohe-Schillingsfürst (German: Viktor Moritz Carl 1. Herzog von Ratibor, 1. Fürst von Corvey, Prinz zu Hohenlohe-Schillingsfürst; 10 February 1818 – 30 January 1893) was a member of House of Hohenlohe-Schillingsfürst and later Duke of the Silesian duchy of Ratibor (Czech: Ratiboř, Polish: Racibórz) and Prince of Corvey.

== Early life ==
Victor was born at Langenburg, Kingdom of Württemberg, eldest son of Franz Joseph, 1st Prince of Hohenlohe-Schillingsfürst (1787–1841), and Princess Constanze of Hohenlohe-Langenburg (1792–1847). Among his siblings were younger brother, Chlodwig, the Chancellor of Germany and Minister President of Prussia from 1894 to 1900.

His paternal grandparents were Karl Albrecht II, Prince of Hohenlohe-Schillingsfürs and Baroness Judith Reviczky of Revisnye. His maternal grandparents were Karl Ludwig, Prince of Hohenlohe-Langenburg and Countess Amalie of Solms-Baruth.

After initial private lessons, he attended the Royal Grammar School in Erfurt. He then studied law and modern languages in Göttingen, Bonn, Heidelberg and Lausanne. He also traveled to Switzerland, Italy, France and England.

== Career ==
He subsequently managed the property of his uncle, the Landgrave of Hesse-Rotenburg, Victor Amadeus. These included the former monastery of Corvey in Westphalia, Ratibor in Upper Silesia. This area was 34,000 hectares in size and consisted mainly of forest areas.

Victor was created Duke of Ratibor and Prince of Corvey on 15 October 1840 by King Frederick William IV of Prussia.

=== Military career ===
During his military service, made at an early age in the cavalry. In the 1850s he commanded in repeated exercises the 2nd -Landwehr Regiment. During the Austro-Prussian War and the Franco-Prussian War, he organized as Chairman of the Silesian Association Knights Voluntary Health Care. Since 1872, he led the honorary title of General of Cavalry à la suite.

In 1893, he was elected as the first president of the German Experimental Institute for Small Arms.

=== Political career ===
In 1847 Ratibor was a member of the Prussian United Diet. Between 1856 and 1893 he was a member of provincial parliament for Silesia Province. At first he was Marshal of the Assembly. After the introduction of the new provincial order, he was repeatedly chairman. He was also from 1849 to 1852 on the second chamber of the Prussian State Parliament. In 1850 Ratibor was a member of the Erfurt Union Parliament. From 1867 to 1870 he was a member of the North German Reichstag, and from 1872 to 1890 of the German Reichstag. He was also member from 1854 to 1893 of the Prussian House of Lords. In the latter, he was co-founder of the New Group in 1870/72, from 1877 to 1893 President of the House.

Ratibor was one of the liberal-conservative Aristocracy, political reformants, he was a supporter of Otto von Bismarck. He was also one of the founders of the Free Conservative Party.

== Personal life ==
Victor married 19 April 1845 at Donaueschingen to Princess Amélie of Fürstenberg (1821–1899), third child of Karl Egon II, Prince of Fürstenberg, and his wife, Princess Amalie of Baden. Together, they had ten children:

- Princess Amelia of Hohenlohe-Schillingsfürst (1846–1847), who died young.
- Viktor II, Duke of Ratibor (1847–1923), who married Countess Maria Breunner-Enkevoirth, in 1867.
- Prince Franz of Hohenlohe-Schillingsfürst (1849–1925)
- Princess Elisabeth of Hohenlohe-Schillingsfürst (1851–1928)
- Prince Egon of Hohenlohe-Schillingsfürst (1853–1896), who married Princess Leopoldine of Lobkowicz, in 1885.
- Princess Marie of Hohenlohe-Schillingsfürst (1854–1928)
- Prince Maximilian of Hohenlohe-Schillingsfürst (1856–1924), who married Countess Franziska Grimaud d'Orsay, in 1882.
- Prince Ernst of Hohenlohe-Schillingsfürst (1857–1891)
- Prince Karl Egon of Hohenlohe-Schillingsfürst (1860–1931)
- Princess Margaret of Hohenlohe-Schillingsfürst (1863–1940)

The Duke died at Rauden Palace on 30 January 1893.

== Honours ==
He received the following orders and decorations:

- Kingdom of Prussia:
  - Grand Cross of the Red Eagle, 18 October 1861; with Collar, 1875
  - Grand Commander's Cross of the Royal House Order of Hohenzollern, 1867; with Star, 11 June 1879
  - Iron Cross (1870), 2nd Class on White Band with Black Edge
  - Knight of the Black Eagle, 10 September 1882; with Collar, 1883
- Austria-Hungary: Knight of the Golden Fleece, 1889
- Baden:
  - Knight of the House Order of Fidelity, 1844
  - Grand Cross of the Zähringer Lion, 1844
- (Saxe-Coburg and Gotha) (Duchy of Saxe-Altenburg) (Saxe-Meiningen) Ernestine duchies: Grand Cross of the Saxe-Ernestine House Order, April 1846
- French Empire: Grand Officer of the Legion of Honour
- Hohenzollern: Cross of Honour of the Princely House Order of Hohenzollern, 1st Class
- Holy See:
  - Grand Cross of the Order of Pope Pius IX
  - Grand Cross of St. Gregory the Great
- Sovereign Military Order of Malta: Bailiff Grand Cross of Honour and Devotion

== Ancestry ==
Ancestors of Viktor I of Ratibor

16. Philipp Ernst, 1st Prince of Hohenlohe-Waldenburg-Schillingsfürst
8. Karl Albrecht I, 2nd Prince of Hohenlohe-Waldenburg-Schillingsfürst
17. Countess Maria Anna of Oettingen-Wallerstein
4. Karl Albrecht II, 3rd Prince of Hohenlohe-Waldenburg-Schillingsfürst
18. Dominikus, Prince of Löwenstein-Wertheim-Rochefort
9. Princess Sophie of Löwenstein-Wertheim-Rochefort
19. Landgravine Christine of Hessen-Rheinfels-Rotenburg
2. Franz Joseph, 1st Prince of Hohenlohe-Schillingsfürst
20. Baron András Reviczky de Revisnye
10. Baron Johann Kazimir Reviczky de Revisnye
21. Julianna Nedeczky
5. Baroness Judith Reviczky de Revisnye
22. Baron Ádám Perényi de Perény
11. Baroness Rosalie Perényi de Perény
23. Erzsébet Fráter
1. Viktor I, 1st Duke of Ratibor, 1st Prince of Corvey, Prince of Hohenlohe-Schillingsfürst
24. Ludwig, 1st Prince of Hohenlohe-Langenburg
12. Christian Albrecht, 2nd Prince of Hohenlohe-Langenburg
25. Countess Eleonore of Nassau-Saarbrücken
6. Karl Ludwig, 3rd Prince of Hohenlohe-Langenburg
26. Friedrich Karl, Prince of Stolberg-Gedern
13. Countess Caroline of Stolberg-Gedern
27. Countess Luise of Nassau-Saarbrücken
3. Princess Constanze of Hohenlohe-Langenburg
28. Johann Karl, Count of Solms-Baruth
14. Johann Christian II, Count of Solms-Baruth
29. Countess Louise of Lippe-Biesterfeld
7. Countess Amalie Henriette of Solms-Baruth
30. Count Heinrich VI Reuss of Köstritz
15. Countess Friederike Reuss of Köstritz
31. Henrica Casado de Monteleone

== Notes and sources ==
- Genealogisches Handbuch des Adels, Fürstliche Häuser, Reference: 1956
- Hartwin Spenkuch (2003). "Ratibor, Viktor Herzog von". Neue Deutsche Biographie (in German). Vol. 21. Berlin: Duncker & Humblot. pp. 181–182. (full text online).
- Tiggesbäumker, Günter: Viktor I. Herzog von Ratibor und Fürst von Corvey, Prinz zu Hohenlohe-Schillingsfürst (1818–1893). In: Westfälische Zeitschrift. Band 144, 1994. p. 266–280. Digitalisat
- Tiggesbäumker, Günter: Von Franken nach Westfalen und Schlesien. Der Erbprinz von Hohenlohe-Schillingsfürst wird erster Herzog von Ratibor und Fürst von Corvey. In: Frankenland. 3/2003. p. 207–212.
- Tiggesbäumker, Günter: Das Herzogliche Haus Ratibor und Corvey. 7. erweiterte Auflage. Werl: Börde-Verlag, 2012. (Deutsche Fürstenhäuser. 5.)

Viktor I, 1st Duke of Ratibor, 1st Prince of Corvey House of Hohenlohe-Schillingsfürst Cadet branch of the House of Hohenlohe Born: 10 February 1818 Died: 30 January 1893
German nobility
New title	Duke of Ratibor; 15 October 1840 – 30 January 1893	Succeeded by Victor II
New title	Prince of Corvey; 15 October 1840 – 30 January 1893	Succeeded by Victor II
