= Karl Ludwig, Prince of Hohenlohe-Langenburg =

Prince of Hohenlohe-Langenburg from 1789 to 1825

Karl Ludwig
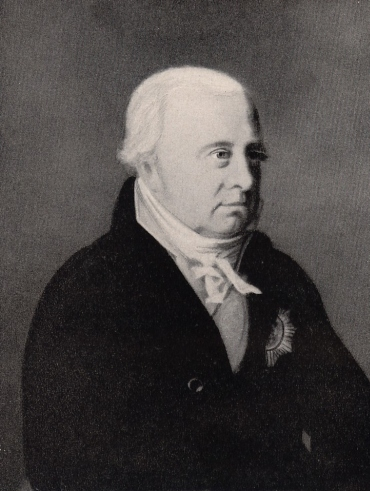
- Charles Louis of Hohenlohe-Langenburg

Prince of Hohenlohe-Langenburg
- Tenure: 4 July 1789 – 4 April 1825
- Predecessor: Christian Albrecht
- Successor: Ernst I
- Born: 10 September 1762; Langenburg, Hohenlohe-Langenburg
- Died: 4 April 1825 (aged 62); Langenburg, Kingdom of Württemberg
- Spouse: Countess Amalie Henriette of Solms-Baruth (m. 1789)
- Issue: Princess Louise; Elisabeth, Landgravine of Hesse-Rotenburg; Constance, Princess of Hohenlohe-Schillingsfürst; Emilie, Countess Friedrich Ludwig of Castell-Castell; Ernst I, Prince of Hohenlohe-Langenburg; Prince Frederick; Princess Marie Henriette; Louise, Princess Adolf of Hohenlohe-Ingelfingen; Johanna, Countess Emil Christian of Erbach-Schönberg; Agnes, Hereditary Princess of Löwenstein-Wertheim-Rosenberg; Prince Henry Gustav; Helene, Duchess Eugen of Württemberg; Prince Henry
- Father: Christian Albrecht, Prince of Hohenlohe-Langenburg
- Mother: Princess Caroline of Stolberg-Gedern

Karl Ludwig, 3rd Prince of Hohenlohe-Langenburg (10 September 1762 – 4 April 1825 in Langenburg) was the third Prince of Hohenlohe-Langenburg.

== Early life ==
Karl Ludwig was born on 10 September 1762 at Langenburg. He was the eldest child of Prince Christian Albert of Hohenlohe-Langenburg, and his wife, Princess Caroline of Stolberg-Gedern (1732–1796), who were first cousins.

His sister, Princess Louise Eleonore, married Georg I, Duke of Saxe-Meiningen. When the Duke of Saxe-Meiningen died on 24 December 1803, his sister took over as regent of the duchy for their son Bernhard II. She ruled during the Napoleonic Wars, which ravaged the Saxon states for a decade. Princess Louise Eleonore's daughter, Princess Adelheid, married King William IV, thereby becoming Queen Consort of the United Kingdom.

His paternal grandparents were Ludwig, 1st Prince of Hohenlohe-Langenburg and Princess Eleanore of Nassau-Saarbrücken. His maternal grandparents were Frederick Charles, Prince of Stolberg-Gedern and Princess Louise of Nassau-Saarbrücken. His grandmother's were sisters, both being daughters of Ludwig Kraft, Count of Nassau-Saarbrücken.

== Career ==
He reigned as a Sovereign Prince between 1789 and 1806 when his Principality became part of the new Kingdom of Württemberg after the German mediatisation.

From 1815 to 1825, he held a seat in the Estates Assembly and since 1820 the First Chamber of the reorganized Estates, but after 1819, he let himself be represented by his son Ernst.

The prince was an avid musician.

== Personal life ==
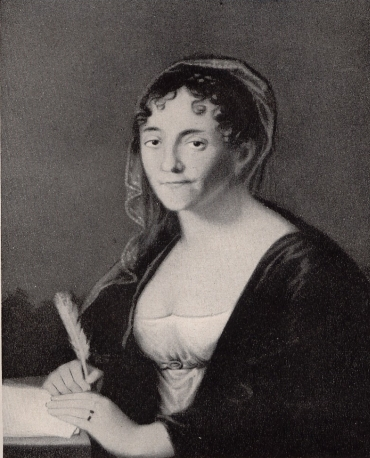
Karl Ludwig's wife: Amalie Henriette

On 30 January 1789 at Kliczków Castle, he married Countess Amalie Henriette of Solms-Baruth (1768–1847), the only child of Count Johann Christian II, Count of Solms-Baruth, and Countess Friederike Louise of Reuss-Köstritz.

The marriage produced thirteen children:

- Princess Louise of Hohenlohe-Langenburg (b. 1789)
- Princess Elisabeth of Hohenlohe-Langenburg (1790–1830), who married Victor Amadeus, Landgrave of Hesse-Rotenburg, Duke of Ratibor
- Princess Constance of Hohenlohe-Langenburg (1792–1847), who married Franz Joseph, Prince of Hohenlohe-Schillingsfürst
- Princess Emilie of Hohenlohe-Langenburg (1793–1859), who married Count Friedrich Ludwig of Castell-Castell; their daughter married Julius, Count of Lippe-Biesterfeld and had issue.
- Prince Ernst of Hohenlohe-Langenburg (1794–1860), who married Princess Feodora of Leiningen in 1828.
- Prince Frederick of Hohenlohe-Langenburg (b. 1797)
- Princess Marie Henriette of Hohenlohe-Langenburg (b. 1798)
- Princess Louise of Hohenlohe-Langenburg (1799–1881), who married Prince Adolf of Hohenlohe-Ingelfingen.
- Princess Johanna "Jenny" of Hohenlohe-Langenburg (1800–1877), who married Count Emil Christian of Erbach-Schönberg.
- Princess Agnes of Hohenlohe-Langenburg (1804–1835), who married Konstantin, Hereditary Prince of Löwenstein-Wertheim-Rosenberg.
- Prince Henry Gustav of Hohenlohe-Langenburg (1806–1861)
- Princess Helene of Hohenlohe-Langenburg (1807–1880), who married Duke Eugen of Württemberg.
- Prince Henry of Hohenlohe-Langenburg (1810–1830)

== Death ==
The Prince of Hohenlohe-Langenburg died at Langenburg on 4 April 1825. His widow died at Karlsruhe on 31 October 1847.

== Ancestry ==
Ancestors of Karl Ludwig, Prince of Hohenlohe-Langenburg

8. Albert Wolfgang, Count of Hohenlohe-Langenburg
4. Ludwig, 1st Prince of Hohenlohe-Langenburg
9. Countess Sophia Amalia of Nassau-Saarbrücken
2. Christian Albert, 2nd Prince of Hohenlohe-Langenburg
10. Ludwig Kraft, Count of Nassau-Saarbrücken
5. Princess Eleanore of Nassau-Saarbrücken
11. Princess Philippine Henriette of Hohenlohe-Langenburg
1. Karl Ludwig, 3rd Prince of Hohenlohe-Langenburg
12. Louis Christian, Count of Stolberg-Gedern
6. Frederick Charles, Prince of Stolberg-Gedern
13. Princess Christine of Mecklenburg-Güstrow
3. Princess Caroline of Stolberg-Gedern
14. Ludwig Kraft, Count of Nassau-Saarbrücken (= 10)
7. Princess Louise of Nassau-Saarbrücken
15. Princess Philippine Henriette of Hohenlohe-Langenburg (= 11)

Karl Ludwig, 3rd Prince of Hohenlohe-Langenburg House of Hohenlohe-Langenburg Cadet branch of the House of Hohenlohe Born: 10 September 1762 Died: 4 April 1825
German nobility
Preceded by Christian Albrecht	Prince of Hohenlohe-Langenburg; 4 July 1789 – 4 April 1825	Succeeded by Ernst I
