= Bernhard II of Saxe-Meiningen =

Duke of Saxe-Meiningen from 1803 to 1866

Bernhard II
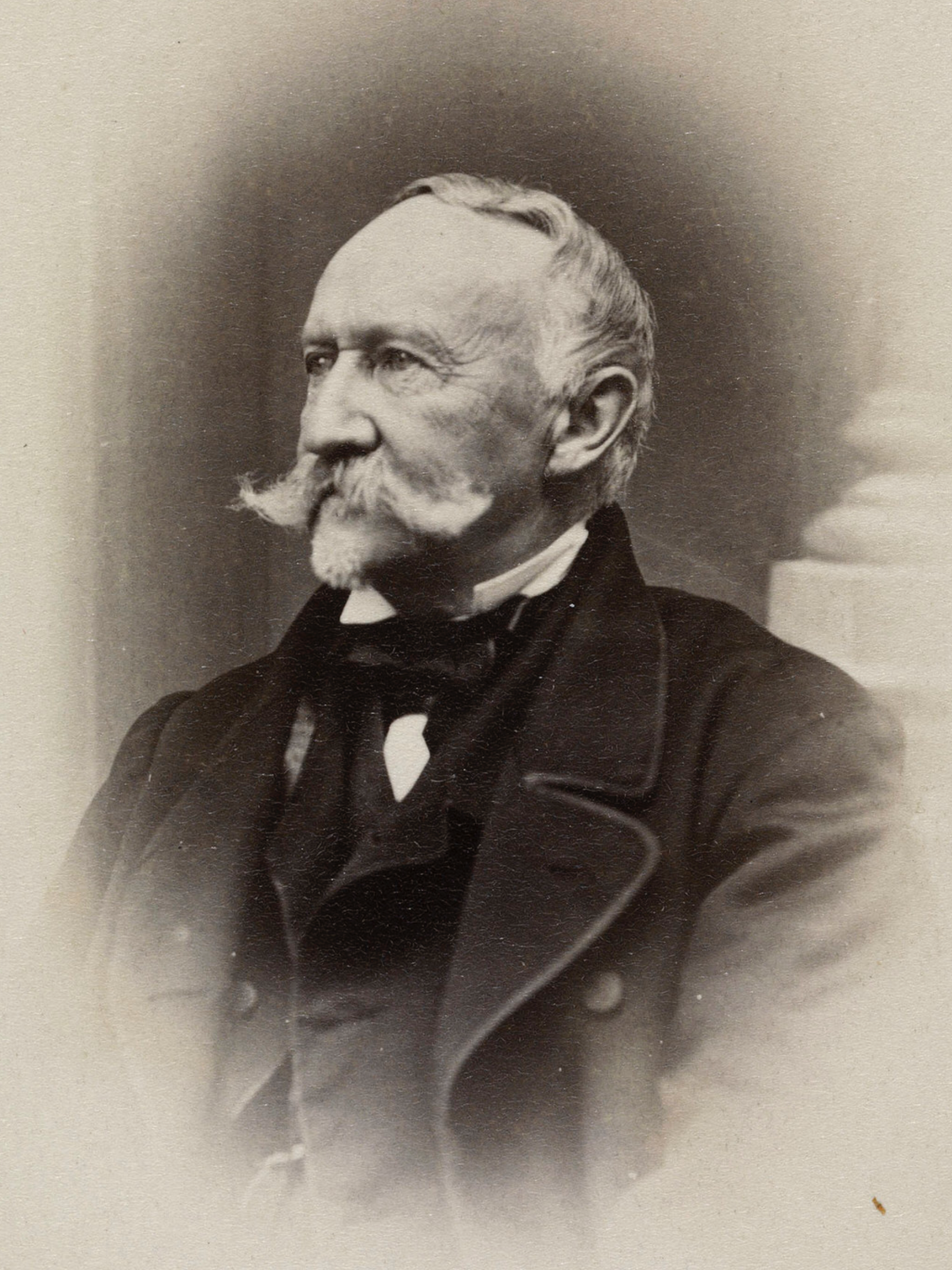
- Photograph of Bernhard II, c. 1871

Duke of Saxe-Meiningen
- Reign: 24 December 1803 – 20 September 1866
- Predecessor: Georg I
- Successor: Georg II
- Regent: The Dowager Duchess
- Born: 17 December 1800; Meiningen, Saxe-Meiningen, Holy Roman Empire
- Died: 3 December 1882 (aged 81); Meiningen, Saxe-Meiningen, German Empire
- Spouse: Marie Fredericka of Hesse-Kassel (m. 1825)
- Issue: Georg II, Duke of Saxe-Meiningen; Augusta, Princess Moritz of Saxe-Altenburg
Names
- Bernhard Erich Freund
- House: Saxe-Meiningen
- Father: Georg I, Duke of Saxe-Meiningen
- Mother: Princess Luise Eleonore of Hohenlohe-Langenburg
- Religion: Lutheranism

Bernhard II (17 December 1800 – 3 December 1882) was a duke of Saxe-Meiningen.

== Family ==
Bernhard was the only son of Georg I Frederick Karl, Duke of Saxe-Meiningen and Luise Eleonore of Hohenlohe-Langenburg. He was a younger brother of Queen Adelaide of the United Kingdom and Ida, Princess Bernhard of Saxe-Weimar-Eisenach.

Bernhard succeeded his father when he was three years old (1803); because of this, his mother, the Dowager Duchess Luise Eleonore, acted as regent on his behalf until he reached adulthood in 1821.

== Marriage ==
In Kassel on 23 March 1825, Bernhard married Princess Marie Frederica of Hesse-Kassel (or Hesse-Cassel). They had two children:

Name	Birth	Death	Notes
Georg II, Duke of Saxe-Meiningen	2 April 1826	25 June 1914	married (1) Princess Charlotte of Prussia; had issue (2) Princess Feodora of Hohenlohe-Langenburg; had issue (3) Ellen Franz; no issue
Augusta Luise Adelaide Karoline Ida	6 August 1843	11 November 1919	married Prince Moritz of Saxe-Altenburg; had issue

On 12 November 1826, after the redistribution of all the family territories after the death of the last Duke of Saxe-Gotha-Altenburg, Bernhard received Hildburghausen and Saalfeld.

== Ancestry ==
Ancestors of Bernhard II of Saxe-Meiningen

8. Bernhard I, Duke of Saxe-Meiningen
4. Anton Ulrich, Duke of Saxe-Meiningen
9. Princess Elisabeth Eleonore of Brunswick-Wolfenbüttel
2. Georg I, Duke of Saxe-Meiningen
10. Charles I, Landgrave of Hesse-Philippsthal
5. Princess Charlotte Amalie of Hesse-Philippsthal
11. Princess Caroline Christine of Saxe-Eisenach
1. Bernhard II, Duke of Saxe-Meiningen
12. Louis, Prince of Hohenlohe-Langenburg
6. Christian Albrecht, Prince of Hohenlohe-Langenburg
13. Countess Eleonore of Nassau-Saarbrücken
3. Princess Louise Eleonore of Hohenlohe-Langenburg
14. Frederick Charles, Prince of Stolberg-Gedern
7. Princess Caroline of Stolberg-Gedern
15. Countess Louise of Nassau-Saarbrücken

== See also ==
- Altenstein Palace

Bernhard II of Saxe-Meiningen House of Saxe-Meiningen Cadet branch of the House of Wettin Born: 17 December 1800 Died: 3 December 1882
Regnal titles
Preceded by Georg I	Duke of Saxe-Meiningen; 1803–1866	Succeeded by Georg II
