= Ernst I of Hohenlohe-Langenburg =

Ernst I
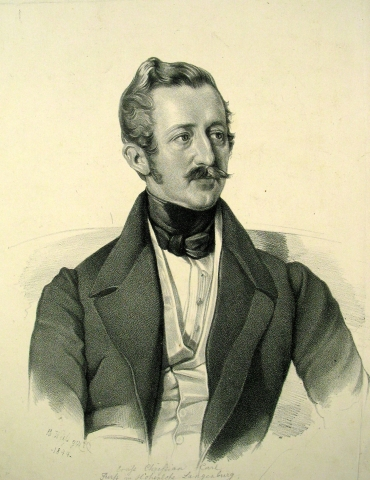
- Portrait of Ernst, 19th century

Prince of Hohenlohe-Langenburg
- Tenure: 4 April 1825 – 12 April 1860
- Predecessor: Carl Ludwig I
- Successor: Carl Ludwig II
- Born: 7 May 1794; Langenburg, Hohenlohe-Langenburg
- Died: 12 April 1860 (aged 65); Baden-Baden, Grand Duchy of Baden
- Spouse: Princess Feodora of Leiningen (m. 1828)
- Issue: Carl Ludwig II, Prince of Hohenlohe-Langenburg; Princess Elise of Hohenlohe-Langenburg; Hermann, Prince of Hohenlohe-Langenburg; Prince Victor of Hohenlohe-Langenburg; Adelheid, Duchess of Schleswig-Holstein; Feodora, Duchess of Saxe-Meiningen
Names
- German: Ernst Christian Karl
- House: Hohenlohe-Langenburg
- Father: Carl Ludwig, Prince of Hohenlohe-Langenburg
- Mother: Countess Amalie Henriette of Solms-Baruth

Ernst I Christian Carl, 4th Prince of Hohenlohe-Langenburg (7 May 1794 – 12 April 1860) was the son of Prince Carl Ludwig of Hohenlohe-Langenburg and Countess Amalie Henriette of Solms-Baruth.

== Biography ==
=== Marriage ===
He married Princess Feodora of Leiningen, the only daughter of Emich Carl, 2nd Prince of Leiningen, and Princess Victoria of Saxe-Coburg-Saalfeld on 18 February 1828 at Kensington Palace in London. She was the elder half-sister of the future British queen.

He succeeded to the title of 4th Prince zu Hohenlohe-Langenburg on 4 April 1825, and attained the rank of Major-General.

=== Issue ===
Name	Birth	Death	Age	Notes
Carl Ludwig Wilhelm Leopold, Prince of Hohenlohe-Langenburg	25 October 1829	16 May 1907	77 years	Succeeded to the title on 12 April 1860, but abdicated his rights in favor of his younger brother on 21 April of the same year. He married morganatically on 22 February 1861 in Paris to Maria Grathwohl (1837–1901) and his issue were created Baron/Baroness von Bronn. Founder of the family of the Princes of Weikersheim.
Princess Elise of Hohenlohe-Langenburg	8 November 1830	27 February 1851	20 years
Hermann Ernst Franz Bernhard VI, Prince of Hohenlohe-Langenburg	31 August 1832	8 March 1913	80 years	Married Princess Leopoldine of Baden
Prince Victor of Hohenlohe-Langenburg	11 December 1833	31 December 1891	58 years	Settled in Great Britain and married morganatically British noblewoman Laura Williamina Seymour. His issue were created Count/Countess von Gleichen. His wife was later (1885) recognized as a Princess by Queen Victoria with the style of Serene Highness.
Princess Adelheid of Hohenlohe-Langenburg	20 July 1835	25 January 1900	64 years	Married Frederick VIII, Duke of Schleswig-Holstein-Sonderburg-Augustenburg.
Princess Feodora Victoria Adelheid of Hohenlohe-Langeburg	7 July 1839	10 February 1872	32 years	Married George II, Duke of Saxe-Meiningen

== Orders and decorations ==
- Württemberg:
  - Knight of the Military Merit Order, 3 July 1815
  - Grand Cross of the Order of the Württemberg Crown, 1830
  - Grand Cross of the Friedrich Order, 1839
- United Kingdom: Honorary Knight Grand Cross of the Most Honourable Order of the Bath (civil division), 22 January 1848

== Ancestry ==
Ancestors of Ernst I of Hohenlohe-Langenburg

8. Ludwig, 1st Prince of Hohenlohe-Langenburg
4. Christian Albert, 2nd Prince of Hohenlohe-Langenburg
9. Princess Eleanore of Nassau-Saarbrücken
2. Carl Ludwig, 3rd Prince of Hohenlohe-Langenburg
10. Frederick Charles of Stolberg-Gedern
5. Princess Carolina of Stolberg-Gedern
11. Princess Louise of Nassau-Saarbrücken
1. Ernst I, 4th Prince of Hohenlohe-Langenburg
12. Johann Carl, Count of Solms-Baruth
6. Johann Christian II, Count of Solms-Baruth
13. Countess Henriette Louise Wilhelmine of Lippe-Biesterfeld
3. Countess Amalie Henriette of Solms-Baruth
14. Heinrich VI, Count Reuss of Köstritz
7. Countess Friederike Reuss of Köstritz
15. Enriqueta Juana Francisca Susana Casado y Huguetan, Marchioness of Monteleone

Ernst I, 4th Prince of Hohenlohe-Langenburg House of Hohenlohe-Langenburg Cadet branch of the House of Hohenlohe Born: 7 May 1794 Died: 12 April 1860
German nobility
Preceded by Carl Ludwig I	Prince of Hohenlohe-Langenburg; 4 April 1825 – 12 April 1860	Succeeded by Carl Ludwig II
