= Princess Louise Eleonore of Hohenlohe-Langenburg =

Duchess of Saxe-Meiningen from 1782 to 1803

Louise Eleonore of Hohenlohe-Langenburg
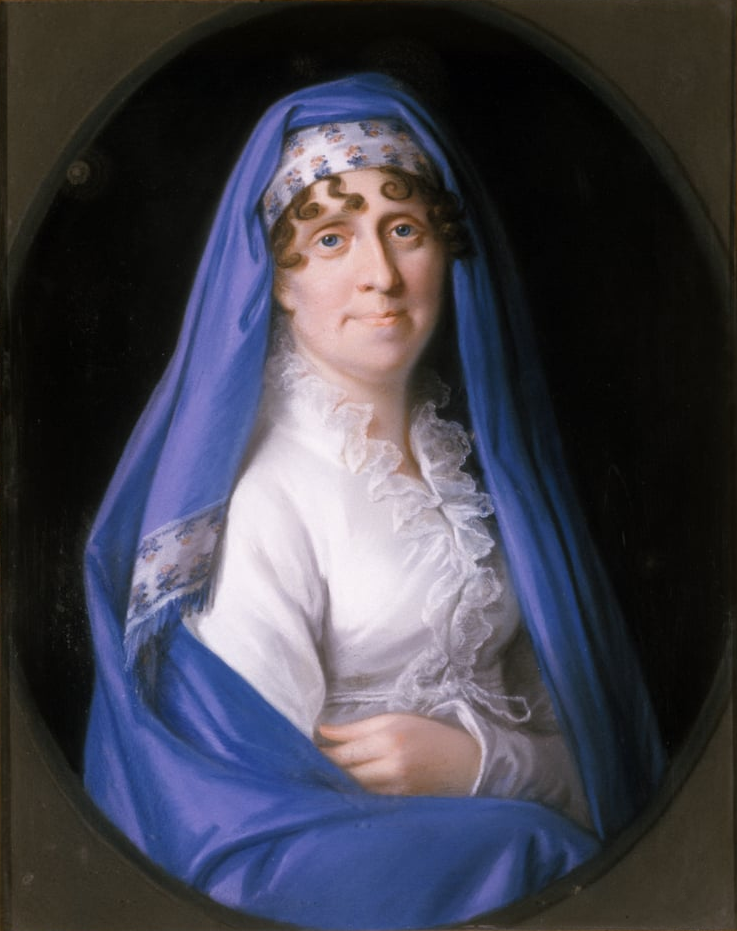
- Portrait, early 19th century

Duchess consort of Saxe-Meiningen
- Tenure: 27 November 1782 – 24 December 1803

Regent of Saxe-Meiningen
- Tenure: 1803–1821
- Born: 11 August 1763; Langenburg
- Died: 30 April 1837 (aged 73); Meiningen
- Burial: 30 April 1837; Parkfriedhof, Meiningen
- Spouse: George I, Duke of Saxe-Meiningen (m. 1782; died 1803)
- Issue: Adelaide, Queen of the United Kingdom; Ida, Princess Bernhard of Saxe-Weimar-Eisenach; Bernhard II, Duke of Saxe-Meiningen
- House: Hohenlohe-Langenburg
- Father: Christian Albert, Prince of Hohenlohe-Langenburg
- Mother: Caroline of Stolberg-Gedern

Princess Louise Eleonore of Hohenlohe-Langenburg (11 August 1763 in Langenburg – 30 April 1837 in Meiningen) was a German regent. She was duchess of Saxe-Meiningen by marriage to George I, Duke of Saxe-Meiningen, and Regent of Saxe-Meiningen during the minority of her son from 1803 to 1821.

== Life ==
Born into the Hohenlohe-Langenburg line of the House of Hohenlohe, Louise Eleonore was the eldest daughter of Prince Christian Albert Louis of Hohenlohe-Langenburg and his wife, Princess Caroline of Stolberg-Gedern.

On 27 November 1782, in Langenburg, she married George I, Duke of Saxe-Meiningen.

=== Regency ===
When her husband died on 24 December 1803, she took over as regent of the duchy for their son Bernhard II. She ruled with energy, courage, and good sense during the Napoleonic Wars, which for the next decade ravaged the Saxon states.

The duchy was forced to join the Confederation of the Rhine during these Wars and provide it with troops; afterwards the duchy was struck with famine, which Luise sought to prevent by importing wheat. French armies, and later those of Russia, marched back and forth across the country, but Luise refused to flee; she stayed with her infant son and two daughters inside their castle.

She used every strategy to preserve the autonomy of her regency, so that when she joined the Allies in 1813, she had saved the duchy for her son. He became the ruling Duke of Meiningen eight years later.

By adjustments in the duchy's administration she ensured the duchy was better managed and in 1821 opened the Gymnasium Bernhardinum in Meiningen (already begun by her husband).

Her children were carefully educated, with a grand tour to Italy under their tutor Johann Heinrich Pestalozzi. After her son came of age, Luise retired as regent and went on several foreign trips, including one to England to visit her daughter Adelaide.

== Issue ==
- Adelheid (later Adelaide, 13 August 1792 – 2 December 1849), with whom Luise had a very close relationship; in 1818 she married King William IV of the United Kingdom while Luise was regent and special taxes needed to be instituted in the duchy to raise funds for her enormous dowry (6,000 florins per year).
- Ida (25 June 1794 – 4 April 1852), married Prince Bernhard of Saxe-Weimar-Eisenach.
- Stillborn daughter (16 October 1796).
- Bernhard II, Duke of Saxe-Meiningen, (17 December 1800 – 3 December 1882), married Princess Marie Frederica of Hesse-Kassel (1804–1888).

== Ancestry ==
Ancestors of Princess Louise Eleonore of Hohenlohe-Langenburg

8. Albert Wolfgang, Count of Hohenlohe-Langenburg
4. Louis, Prince of Hohenlohe-Langenburg
9. Sophie Amalie of Nassau-Saarbrücken
2. Christian Albert, Prince of Hohenlohe-Langenburg
10. Louis Crato, Count of Nassau-Saarbrücken
5. Countess Eleonore of Nassau-Saarbrücken
11. Philippine Henriette of Hohenlohe-Langenburg
1. Luise Eleonore of Hohenlohe-Langenburg
12. Louis Christian, Count of Stolberg-Gedern
6. Frederick Charles of Stolberg-Gedern
13. Christine of Mecklenburg-Güstrow
3. Princess Caroline of Stolberg-Gedern
14. Louis Crato, Count of Nassau-Saarbrücken (= 10)
7. Countess Louise Henriette of Nassau-Saarbrücken
15. Philippine Henriette of Hohenlohe-Langenburg (= 11)

== Sources ==
- (in German) L. Hertel, Schriften des Vereins für Sachsen-Meiningische Geschichte und Landeskunde, Hildburghausen 1903
- Koller, Ann Marie (1984). The Theater Duke: George II of Saxe-Meiningen and the German Stage. Stanford University Press. ISBN 0-8047-1196-8.

Princess Louise Eleonore of Hohenlohe-Langenburg House of Hohenlohe-Langenburg Born: 11 August 1763 Died: 30 April 1837
Royal titles
Preceded by Louise of Stolberg-Gedern	Duchess consort of Saxe-Meiningen; 1782-1803	Vacant Title next held by Marie Frederica of Hesse-Kassel
