= George I of Saxe-Meiningen =

Duke of Saxe-Meiningen from 1782 to 1803

George I
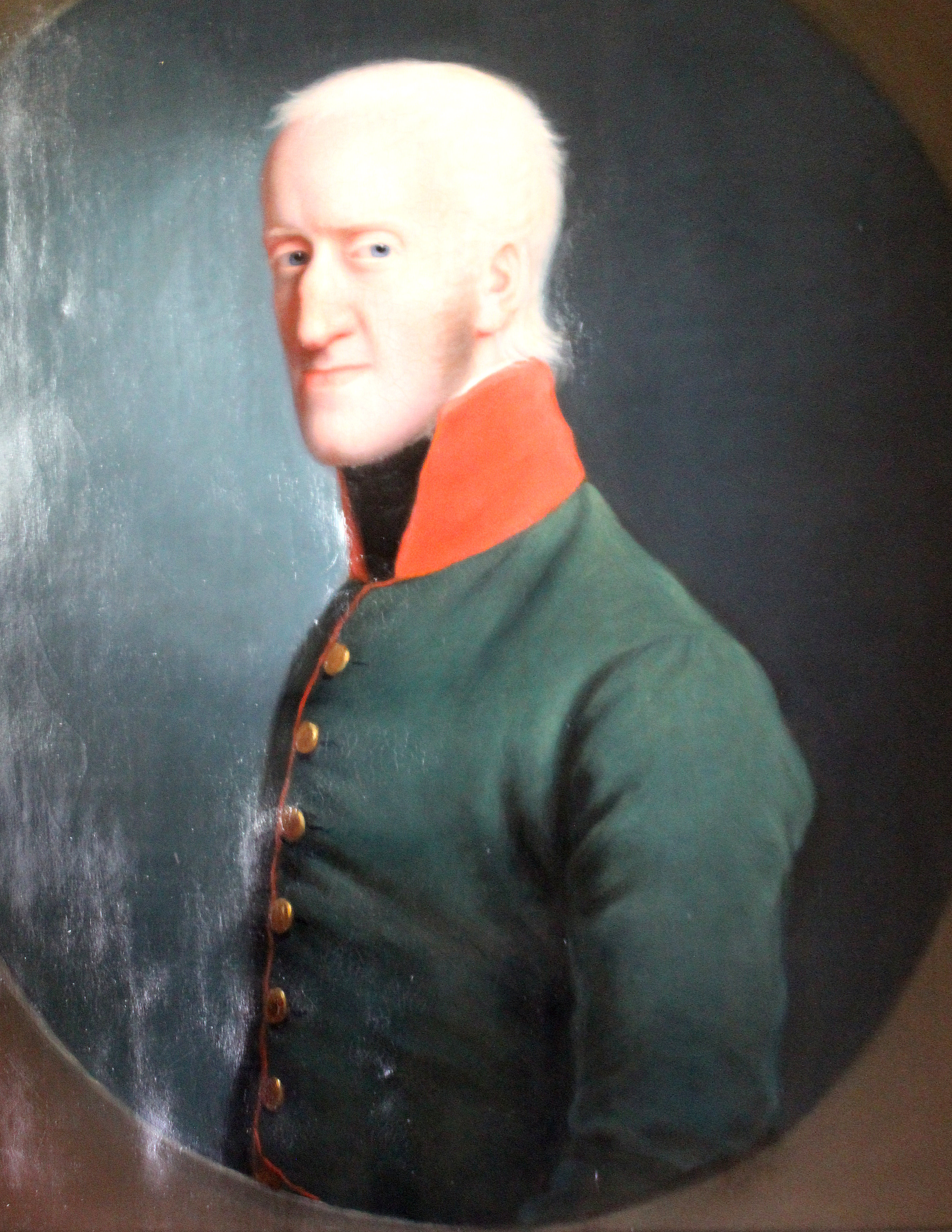
- Portrait of George I

Duke of Saxe-Meiningen
- Reign: 21 July 1782 – 24 December 1803
- Predecessor: Karl Wilhelm
- Successor: Bernhard II
- Born: 4 February 1761; Meiningen, Saxe-Meiningen, Holy Roman Empire
- Died: 24 December 1803 (aged 42); Meiningen, Saxe-Meiningen, Holy Roman Empire
- Spouse: Luise Eleonore of Hohenlohe-Langenburg (m. 1782)
- Issue: Adelaide, Queen of the United Kingdom; Ida, Princess Bernhard of Saxe-Weimar-Eisenach; Bernhard II
Names
- Georg Friedrich Karl
- House: Saxe-Meiningen
- Father: Anton Ulrich, Duke of Saxe-Meiningen
- Mother: Charlotte Amalie of Hesse-Philippsthal
- Religion: Lutheranism

George I (German: Georg Friedrich Karl; 4 February 1761 – 24 December 1803), was Duke of Saxe-Meiningen from 21 July 1782 until his death in 1803. He was known as a reformer and considered a model prince by many of his peers.

== Family ==
George was born on 4 February 1761 in Frankfurt as the fourth but second surviving son of Anton Ulrich, Duke of Saxe-Meiningen and his wife, Charlotte Amalie of Hesse-Philippsthal. By birth, he was member of the Ernestine line of the House of Wettin. His father was 73 years old at the time and died less than two years later in January 1763.

== Reign ==
George succeeded his older and childless brother, Karl Wilhelm in the Duchy of Saxe-Meiningen in 1782. He ruled based on the principles of "enlightened absolutism" emphasizing in particular the importance of education.

He initiated the building of the Gymnasium later named Bernhardinum after his son. George I also opened the ducal library to the public, reformed the (Protestant) church practices in his princedom and initiated new social policies.

Under a pen name, he published philosophical treatises. As a result, many of his fellow princes considered him a model ruler and his duchy as the German state where enlightened absolutism reached its apogee.

== Marriage and heir ==
In Langenburg on 27 November 1782, George married Luise Eleonore of Hohenlohe-Langenburg, the eldest daughter of Prince Christian Albert Louis of Hohenlohe-Langenburg (1726-1789) and his wife, Princess Caroline of Stolberg-Gedern (1732–1796).

After ten years they began to have children, finally having four:

1. Adelaide Luise Therese Karoline Amalie (b. Meiningen, 13 August 1792 – d. Bentley Priory, Middlesex, 2 December 1849), married on 11 July 1818 to the Duke of Clarence, later King William IV of the United Kingdom.
2. Ida (b. Meiningen, 25 June 1794 – d. Weimar, 4 April 1852), married on 30 May 1816 to Bernhard of Saxe-Weimar-Eisenach.
3. stillborn daughter (Meiningen, 16 October 1796).
4. Bernhard II Erich Freund, Duke of Saxe-Meiningen (b. Meiningen, 17 December 1800 – d. Meiningen, 3 December 1882).

== Death ==
George I died of a fever on 24 December 1803 at Meiningen. He is buried, alongside his wife, Louise Eleonore, in Parkfriedhof, Meiningen, Germany.

== See also ==
- Schloss and park Altenstein

== Ancestry ==
Ancestors of George I of Saxe-Meiningen

16. John II, Duke of Saxe-Weimar
8. Ernest I, Duke of Saxe-Gotha
17. Dorothea Maria of Anhalt
4. Bernhard I, Duke of Saxe-Meiningen
18. John Philip, Duke of Saxe-Altenburg
9. Princess Elisabeth Sophie of Saxe-Altenburg
19. Elisabeth of Brunswick-Wolfenbüttel
2. Anton Ulrich, Duke of Saxe-Meiningen
20. Augustus the Younger, Duke of Brunswick-Lüneburg
10. Anthony Ulrich, Duke of Brunswick-Wolfenbüttel
21. Dorothea of Anhalt-Zerbst
5. Elisabeth Eleonore of Brunswick-Wolfenbüttel
22. Frederick, Duke of Schleswig-Holstein-Sønderburg-Norburg
11. Duchess Elizabeth Juliana of Schleswig-Holstein-Sonderburg-Norburg
23. Eleanor of Anhalt-Zerbst
1. George I, Duke of Saxe-Meiningen
24. William VI, Landgrave of Hesse-Kassel
12. Philip, Landgrave of Hesse-Philippsthal
25. Margravine Hedwig Sophie of Brandenburg
6. Charles I, Landgrave of Hesse-Philippsthal
26. Carl Otto, Count of Solms-Laubach
13. Countess Catherine of Solms-Laubach
27. Countess Amöna Elisabeth of Bentheim-Steinfurt
3. Landgravine Charlotte Amalie of Hesse-Philippsthal
28. John George I, Duke of Saxe-Eisenach
14. John William III, Duke of Saxe-Eisenach
29. Countess Johannetta of Sayn-Wittgenstein-Sayn-Altenkirchen
7. Princess Christine of Saxe-Eisenach
30. Charles Gustav of Baden-Durlach
15. Margravine Christine Juliane of Baden-Durlach
31. Duchess Anna Sophie of Brunswick-Wolfenbüttel

George I of Saxe-Meiningen House of Saxe-Meiningen Cadet branch of the House of Wettin Born: 4 February 1761 Died: 24 December 1803
Regnal titles
Preceded by Karl Wilhelm	Duke of Saxe-Meiningen; 1782–1803	Succeeded by Bernhard II
