= Gedern =

- Town
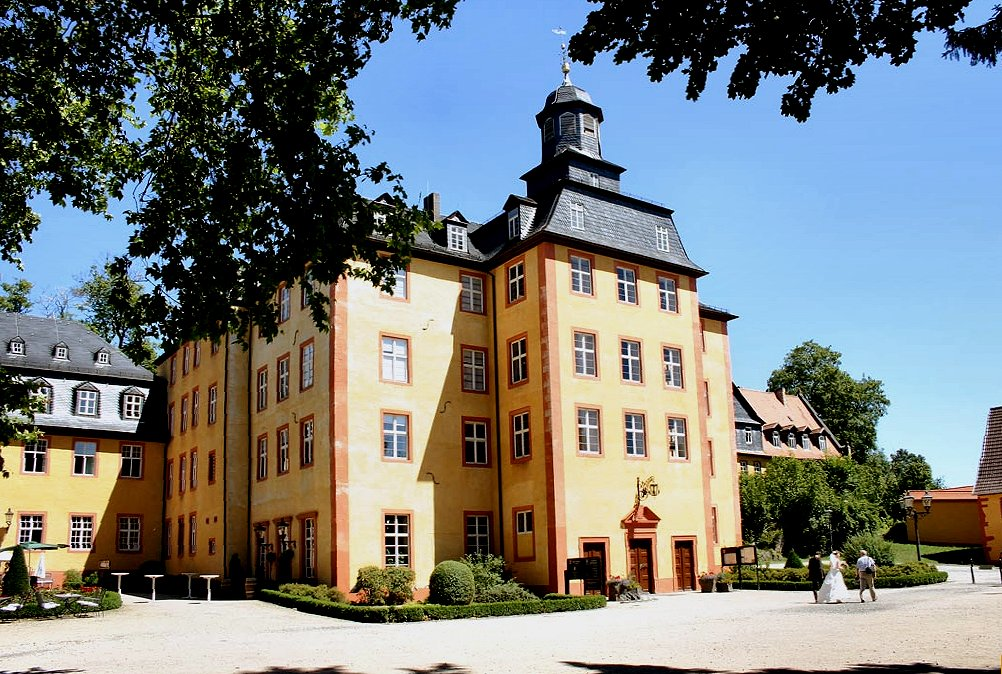
- Gedern Castle

- Coat of arms

- Location of Gedern within Wetteraukreis district
- Interactive map of Gedern
- Location within Germany Location within Hesse
- Coordinates: 50°25′28″N 9°11′59″E
- Country: Germany
- State: Hesse
- Admin. region: Darmstadt
- District: Wetteraukreis
- Subdivisions: 6 districts

Government
  - Mayor (2021–27): Guido Kempel (Ind.)

Area
  - Total: 75.24 km^{2} (29.05 sq mi)
- Elevation: 357 m (1,171 ft)

Population (2025-12-31)
  - Total: 6,657
  - Density: 88.48/km^{2} (229.2/sq mi)
- Time zone: UTC+01:00 (CET)
  - Summer (DST): UTC+02:00 (CEST)
- Postal codes: 63688
- Dialling codes: 06045
- Vehicle registration: FB, BÜD
- Website: www.gedern.de

Gedern (German pronunciation: [ˈɡeːdɐn]) is a town in the Wetteraukreis district in Hesse, Germany, and historically belongs to Oberhessen. It is located 38 kilometres (24 mi) northeast of Hanau at the foot of the Vogelsberg, one of the largest inactive volcanoes in Europe.

== Neighboring towns ==
Gedern is bordered by Schotten (Vogelsbergkreis) in the north, by Grebenhain (Vogelsbergkreis) in the northeast, by Birstein (Main-Kinzig-Kreis) in the east, by Kefenrod in the south, by Ortenberg in the southwest, and Hirzenhain in the west.

== Organization ==
Gedern is divided into the districts of Gedern, Mittel-Seemen, Nieder-Seemen, Ober-Seemen, Steinberg, and Wenings.

== History ==
- The first records of Gedern come from the year 730 AD.
- City rights were given to Gedern on January 10, 1356, by Charles IV, Holy Roman Emperor, 20 years after Wenings, a current district of Gedern, received its city rights from Louis IV, Holy Roman Emperor.
- Sovereign Principality of Gedern (or Stolberg-Gedern) between 1742 and 1804 (Frederick Charles of Stolberg-Gedern became in 1742 Prince of the Holy Roman Empire, with princely title for all his male-line descendants)
- After the Congress of Vienna, command of Gedern passed to the Grand Duchy of Hesse.
- Many zoning reforms have taken place in Gedern since then. In 1852 Gedern was placed into the Kreis Nidda district. Then, when this district was removed in 1874, Gedern was placed into the Schotten district. In yet another reform in 1936, Gedern was placed into Landkreis Büdingen. After the last reorganization in 1972, Gedern and five other towns were incorporated into Wetteraukreis.

== Politics ==
=== Town council ===
The town council consists of the mayor, Stefan Betz (independent), and the aldermen Klaus Hein, Walter Lutz and Barbara Gundlach (CDU), Klaus Bechthold and Andreas Steder (SPD), Reinhold Landmann and Irmtraud Köhler (FWG) and Willi Herbst (Bürgerliste Gedern).

=== Mayor ===
The last election for mayor was held in 2021 in which Guido Kempel was re-elected. In 2015 Kempel replaced Klaus Bechthold (SPD) who retired for health reasons.

=== Coat of arms ===
The city coat of arms shows two trout on a red and silver striped background. These represent the copious amounts of fish that were caught in and around Gedern throughout its history. The silver stripes stand for the two creeks, Mühlbach and Gänsbach, that run through Gedern.

=== Partnerships ===
Gedern is twinned with Columbia, Illinois, and Polanów, Poland, through the Sister Cities Program. The village of Wenings is also partnered with Nucourt, France. The sister city arrangement with Columbia has its roots in an initiative of some inhabitants of Columbia in 1990. During a genealogical research, they found that most of the 156 people who emigrated from Gedern in the 19th century found a new home in the area of Columbia. In April 1992 the representatives of both cities signed a treaty of friendship during a visit of a delegation from Columbia in Gedern. The official partnership ceremony was held in May 1993 in Columbia, Illinois.

== Economy and infrastructure ==
=== Local companies ===
Measured by its size, Gedern was an important industrial hub during the 1980s in the industrially weak area around the Vogelsberg. There were several textile, wood, rubber, and metal refining factories. Today only a large metal-refining company is still active.

Today Gedern is economically unimportant. Retail, manual labor, and trade work that make up the core of the economic activities are done on a very small scale. The vast majority of the inhabitants of Gedern commute to other areas in the Rhein-Main and Gießen regions.

=== Educational facilities ===
- Gedern has a comprehensive school (Gesamtschule) with the levels Hauptschule, Realschule, and Gymnasium up to tenth grade.
- Several elementary schools are also found in Gedern and the surrounding area.

=== Recreation ===
- The Gederner See (Lake Gedern) attracts many campers and swimmers every summer.
- Gedern also has a heated indoor pool in the recreation center (Sportzentrum) on Schmitterberg—the hill that separates the village from the lake area.
- Around the lake, there is also a glider runway. On weekends with good weather, one can see the gliders in the sky all around Gedern.
- The Volcano Bike Path runs from Stockheim to Lauterbach along the old train tracks.
- Ober-Seemen is also home to the county youth summer camp Groß-Gerau.

== Sons and daughters of the city ==
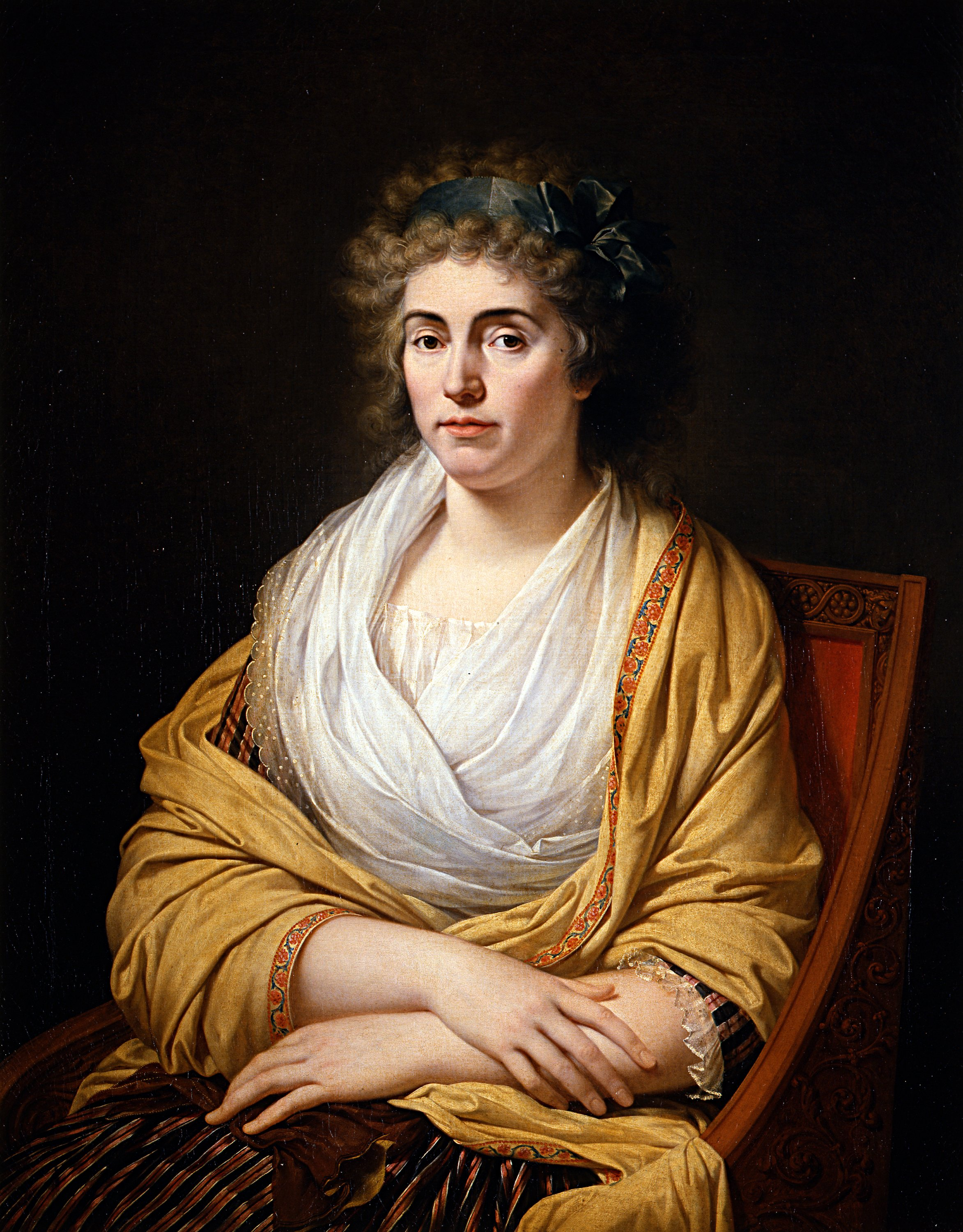
Louise, Countess d'Albany 1793

- Christian Ernest of Stolberg-Wernigerode (1691–1771), reigning Count of the County of Wernigerode
- Frederick Charles of Stolberg-Gedern (1693–1767), owner of the Stolbergian domination of Gedern
- Princess Louise of Stolberg-Gedern (1752–1824), Countess of Albany
- Eduard von Fransecky (1807–1890), Prussian General of the Infantry
- Otto of Stolberg-Wernigerode (1837–1896), politician and Vice Chancellor with Otto von Bismarck
- Edgar Itt (born 1967), athlete (sprinter)
- Sandra Minnert (born 1973), football player and manager
