= Lordship of Gedern =

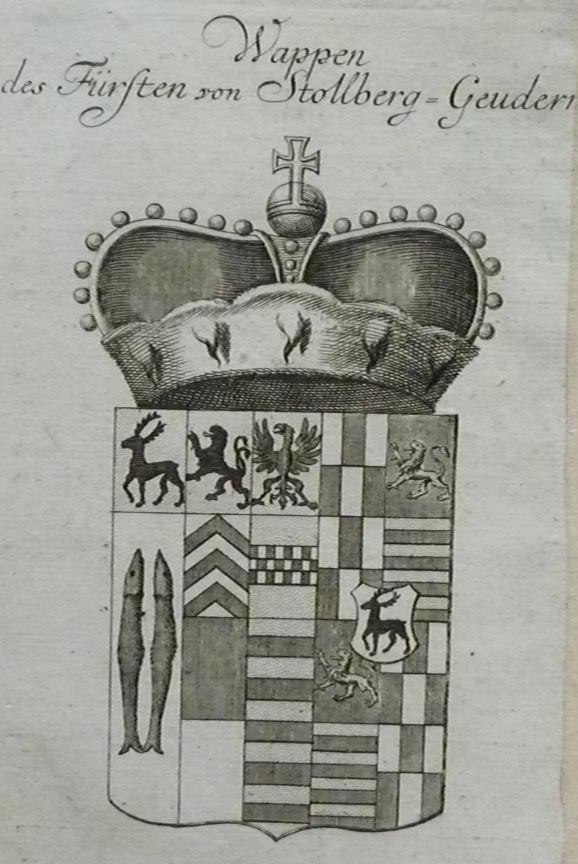
Coat of Arms of the Princes of Stolberg-Gedern

The Lordship of Gedern (German: Herrschaft Gedern) was a lordship or herrschaft centred on Gedern near Büdingen in Hesse, Germany. It is first recorded in a document from Lorsch Abbey dating to 780.

== History ==
The lords of Ortenburg (descended from the Lords of Büdingen) built a castle in Gedern. In 1247, after the death of Gerlach II, Bailiff of Büdingen, Gedern fell to Eberhard I of Breuberg from the House of Reis von Beuberg and Albert I of Trimberg, who had married Gerlach's daughter. Eberhard I of Breuberg was followed by his son Gerlach and that Gerlach's son Eberhard III, both bailiffs of Wetterau.

In 1323, Eberhard III died without leaving a surviving son and so the Lordship of Gedern passed to Conrad V of Trimberg and Gottfried V of Eppstein. In 1356, Charles IV, Holy Roman Emperor granted the House of Trimberg market rights in Gedern. When they died in 1376/84 in Mannesstam, Gedern passed entirely to the House of Eppstein. After the House of Eppstein divided up its lands in 1433, Gedern passed to the Eppstein-Königstein line. The last of that line, Eberhard IV, had no male issue and so it passed to the house of Stolberg, to which his wife Anna and his nephew Louis of Stolberg belonged. Louis grew up with Eberhard and Anna from 1514 onwards and became Eberhard's heir.

== Stolberg-Gedern ==
On Eberhard IV's death in 1535, Gedern and its associated County of Königstein passed to the Counts of Stolberg. Louis took them both over and founded the short-lived County of Stolberg-Königstein. After the male line went extinct, it passed to the Stolberg-Wernigerode line.

In 1677, the house of Stolberg-Gedern was created by the division of the lands of the house of Stolberg-Wernigerode. The second count of Stolberg-Gedern, Frederick Charles, bought promotion to the status of an Imperial Prince from Charles VII, Holy Roman Emperor on 18 February 1742. The Princes of Stolberg-Gedern became extinct in the male line in 1804 and so the lordship of Gedern was passed back to the main Stolberg-Wernigerode line. However, with the adoption of the sovereignty rights outlined in the Treaty of the Confederation of the Rhine, that line had to cede it to Hesse-Darmstadt, then elevated to Grand Duchy of Hesse. In 1816, Gedern and the Stolberg-Wernigerode line also briefly fell under Isenburg. In 1945, the area became part of Großhessen, then the following year part of Hesse.
