= Caroline of Stolberg-Gedern (1732–1796) =

Princess of Hohenlohe-Langenburg (1732–1796)

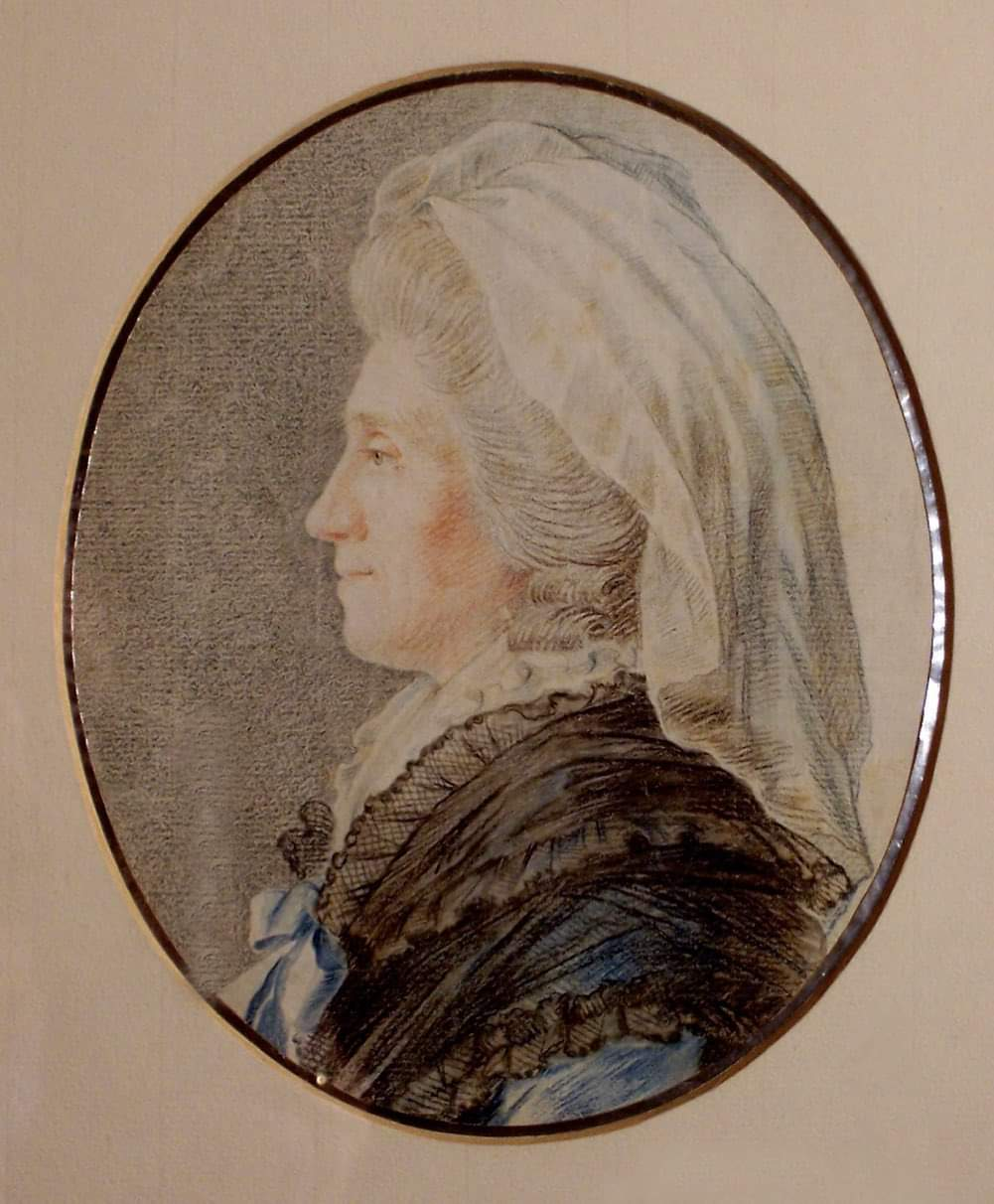

Princess consort of Hohenlohe-Langenburg
- Tenure: 16 January 1765 – 4 July 1789
- Born: 27 June 1732; Gedern
- Died: 28 May 1796 (aged 63); Langenburg
- Spouse: Christian Albert, Prince of Hohenlohe-Langenburg (m. 1761; died 1789)
- Issue: Karl Ludwig, Prince of Hohenlohe-Langenburg; Louise Eleonore, Duchess of Saxe-Meiningen
- House: Stolberg
- Father: Frederick Charles of Stolberg-Gedern
- Mother: Louise Henriette of Nassau-Saarbrücken

Caroline of Stolberg-Gedern (27 June 1732, in Gedern – 28 May 1796, in Langenburg) was a Princess of Stolberg-Gerdern by birth and by marriage a princess of Hohenlohe-Langenburg.

== Life ==
Caroline was born on 27 June 1732, the daughter of Frederick Charles of Stolberg-Gedern and Countess Louise Henriette of Nassau-Saarbrücken (1705-1766). On 13 April 1761 she married her first cousin Christian Albert, Prince of Hohenlohe-Langenburg. She died on 28 May 1796.

== Issue ==
- Charles Louis (10 September 1762 – 4 April 1825), married Countess Amalie of Solms-Baruth
- Louise Eleanore (11 August 1763 – 30 April 1837), married Duke George I of Saxe-Meiningen
- Gustav Adolph (9 October 1764 – 21 July 1796)
- Christine Caroline (19 November 1765 – 6 December 1768)
- Louis William (16 February 1767 – 17 December 1768)
- Christian August (15 March 1768 – 18 April 1796)
- Caroline Auguste (15 November 1769 – 30 July 1803)
