= Christian Albrecht, Prince of Hohenlohe-Langenburg =

Prince of Hohenlohe-Langenburg from 1765 to 1789

Christian Albrecht

Prince of Hohenlohe-Langenburg
- Tenure: 16 January 1765 – 4 July 1789
- Predecessor: Ludwig
- Successor: Karl Ludwig
- Born: 27 March 1726; Langenburg
- Died: 4 July 1789 (aged 63); Ludwigsruhe, Langenburg
- Spouse: Caroline of Stolberg-Gedern (m. 1761)
- Issue: Karl Ludwig, Prince of Hohenlohe-Langenburg; Louise Eleonore, Duchess of Saxe-Meiningen
- House: Hohenlohe-Langenburg
- Father: Ludwig, Prince of Hohenlohe-Langenburg
- Mother: Countess Eleonore of Nassau-Saarbrücken

Christian Albrecht, 2nd Prince of Hohenlohe-Langenburg (27 March 1726 – 4 July 1789), was the second ruling Prince of Hohenlohe-Langenburg and a Dutch lieutenant-general.

== Early life and ancestry ==
Born into the House of Hohenlohe, he was the first child of Ludwig, Prince of Hohenlohe-Langenburg and Countess Eleonore of Nassau-Saarbrücken. When his father died on 16 January 1765, Christian Albrecht succeeded him as Prince of Hohenlohe-Langenburg.

== Marriage and issue ==
On 13 May 1761 in Gedern, he married Princess Caroline of Stolberg-Gedern (1731–1796), daughter of Prince Frederick Charles of Stolberg-Gedern and Countess Louise of Nassau-Saarbrücken. They had seven children:

- Karl Ludwig (10 September 1762 – 4 April 1825)

married Countess Amalia of Solms-Baruth

- Louise Eleonore (11 August 1763 – 30 April 1837)

married Georg I, Duke of Saxe-Meiningen

- Gustav Adolf (9 October 1764 – 21 July 1796)
- Christine Caroline (19 November 1765 – 6 December 1768)
- Ludwig Wilhelm (16 February 1767 – 17 December 1768)
- Christian August (15 March 1768 – 18 April 1796)
- Auguste Karoline (15 November 1769 – 30 July 1803)

Christian Albrecht, Prince of Hohenlohe-Langenburg House of Hohenlohe Born: 27 March 1726 Died: 4 July 1789
Preceded by Louis	Prince of Hohenlohe-Langenburg; 1765–1789	Succeeded by Karl Ludwig
