= Ludwig, Prince of Hohenlohe-Langenburg =

Prince of Hohenlohe-Langenburg (1696–1765)

Ludwig
- Prince of Hohenlohe-Langenburg
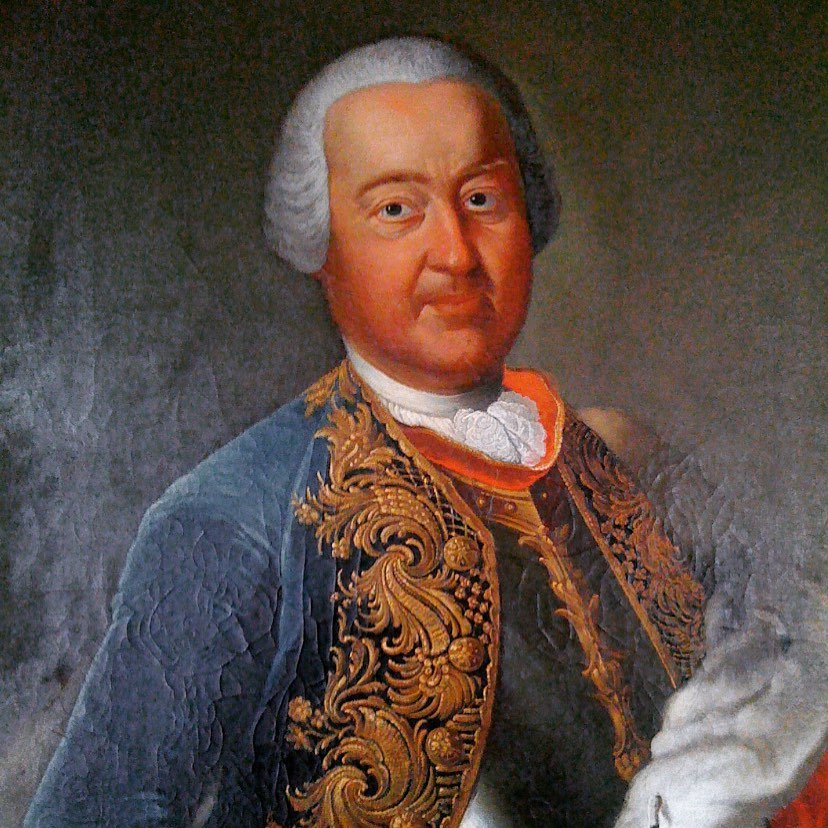
- Born: 20 October 1696; Langenburg
- Died: 16 January 1765 (aged 68); Langenburg
- Spouse: Eleanor of Nassau-Saarbrücken (m. 1723)
- Issue: 13;include Christian Albrecht, Prince of Hohenlohe-Langenburg
- House: Hohenlohe-Langenburg
- Father: Albert Wolfgang, Count of Hohenlohe-Langenburg
- Mother: Sophia Amalia of Nassau-Saarbrücken

Ludwig of Hohenlohe-Langenburg (20 October 1696 in Langenburg – 16 January 1765 in Langenburg) was a Count of Hohenlohe-Langenburg. On 7 January 1764, he was elevated to Imperial Prince by Emperor Francis I.

== Life ==
Born into an old German House of Hohenlohe, he was a son of Count Albert Wolfgang of Hohenlohe-Langenburg and his wife, Countess Sophia Amalia of Nassau-Saarbrücken (1666–1736).

During Ludwig's reign as prince, some modifications to Langenburg Castle were made: the east wing was provided with its present form and further modifications in the Baroque style took place. He also built, as his summer residence, the Lustschloss Ludwigsruhe on the land of the former hamlet of Lindenbronn, next to the hunting park created in 1588.

== Marriage and issue ==
On 23 January 1723, he married his double first cousin, Countess Eleanor of Nassau-Saarbrücken (1707–1769). She was the daughter of Count Louis Crato of Nassau-Saarbrücken (a brother of his mother) and his wife, Countess Philippine Henriette of Hohenlohe-Langenburg (1679–1751) (a sister of his father).

The marriage produced thirteen children:

- Christian Albrecht, Prince of Hohenlohe-Langenburg (1726–1789)
- Friedrich Karl (1728–1728)
- Sophie Henriette (1729–1735)
- Auguste Caroline (1731–1736)
- Luise Charlotte (1732–1777), married Christian Frederick Carl, Prince of Hohenlohe-Kirchberg
- Eleonore Juliane (1734–1813), married Prince Albert of Hohenlohe-Ingelfingen
- Wilhelm Friedrich (1736–1805)
- Philipp Karl (1738–1753)
- Friedrich August (1740–1810)
- Ludwig Gottfried (1742–1765)
- Christiane Henriette (1744–1744)
- Caroline Christiane (1746–1750)
- Friedrich Ernst (1750–1794), married Magdalena Adriana van Haren

Ludwig, Prince of Hohenlohe-Langenburg House of Hohenlohe Born: 20 October 1696 Died: 16 January 1765
Preceded by Albert Wolfgang	Count of Hohenlohe-Langenburg; 1715-1765	Succeeded by Christian Albrecht as Prince of Hohenlohe-Langenburg
