= Frederick Charles, Prince of Stolberg-Gedern =

Prince of Stolberg-Gedern (1693–1767)

Frederick Charles
- Prince of Stolberg-Gedern
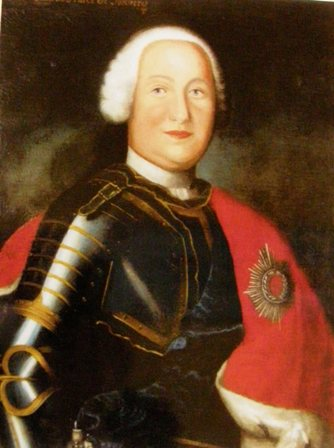
- Portrait of Frederick Charles, Prince of Stolberg-Gedern by an unknown painter (18th century)
- Born: 11 October 1693; Gedern
- Died: 28 September 1767 (aged 73); Gedern
- Noble family: House of Stolberg-Gedern (founder)
- Spouse: Louise of Nassau-Saarbrücken (m. 1719; died 1766)
- Issue: Louis Christian of Stolberg-Gedern; Gustav Adolf of Stolberg-Gedern; Christian Charles of Stolberg-Gedern; Caroline, Princess of Hohenlohe-Langenburg
- Father: Louis Christian, Count of Stolberg-Gedern
- Mother: Duchess Christine of Mecklenburg-Güstrow

Frederick Charles, Prince of Stolberg-Gedern (11 October 1693 – 28 September 1767), was a German politician. He founded the Stolberg-Gedern line of the House of Stolberg, which ended in 1804 when it became part of the line of Stolberg-Wernigerode.

== Life ==
Frederick Charles was the son of Louis Christian, Count of Stolberg-Gedern (1652-1710) and his second wife, Christine of Mecklenburg-Güstrow. He was the younger brother of Ernest, Count of Stolberg-Wernigerode. After his father's death in 1710, Frederick was granted the Lordship of Gedern and one sixth of the Lordship of Rochefort, per his father's will of 23 January 1699. He later received another sixth of the Lordship from his brother Christian Ernest, and after the death of Count Henry August of Stolberg-Schwarza, an additional sixth.

On 18 February 1742 he purchased the elevation to the rank of Imperial Prince, in the presence of Holy Roman Emperor Charles VII in Frankfurt am Main. The beneficiaries of this elevation included his descendants and his sister (the abbess Auguste Marie at Herford Abbey), but not other counts and countesses of Stolberg.

== Marriage and Descendants ==
Charles married Countess Louise of Nassau-Saarbrücken (1705-1766), daughter of Louis Crato, Count of Nassau-Saarbrücken on 13 September 1719. She died one year before him, on 28 October 1766.

They had four children:

- Louis Christian of Stolberg-Gedern (1720–1770); field marshal of the Upper Rhenish Circle
- Gustav Adolf of Stolberg-Gedern (1722–1757); major general, fell at the Battle of Leuthen, father of:
  - Louise of Stolberg-Gedern, Countess of Albany
  - Caroline zu Stolberg-Gedern, Duchess of Berwick and Liria and Jérica.
- Christian Charles of Stolberg-Gedern (1725–1764); imperial field marshal, was his father's heir apparent, but died before him. He was married in 1760 to Countess Eleonore of Reuss-Lobenstein, who served as regent of Stolberg-Gedern from 1767 to 1782 in place of her son.
  - Charles Henry, Prince of Stolberg-Gedern (1761–1804), the last Prince of Stolberg-Gedern (1767–1804).
  - Luise of Stolberg-Gedern (1764–1834); married firstly, in 1780, Charles William, Duke of Saxe-Meiningen; married secondly, in 1787, Duke Eugen of Württemberg (1758–1822).
- Caroline of Stolberg-Gedern (1732–1796); married in 1761 Christian Albert, Prince of Hohenlohe-Langenburg.
