= Kraft, Prince of Hohenlohe-Langenburg =

Kraft

Prince of Hohenlohe-Langenburg
- Tenure: 11 May 1960 – 16 March 2004
- Predecessor: Gottfried
- Successor: Philipp
- Born: 25 June 1935; Schwäbisch Hall, Württemberg, Nazi Germany
- Died: 16 March 2004 (aged 68); Langenburg, Baden-Württemberg, Germany
- Spouse: Princess Charlotte of Croÿ (m. 1965; div. 1990) Irma Pospesch (m. 1992)
- Issue: Princess Cécile, Mrs Mani; Philipp, 10th Prince of Hohenlohe-Langenburg; Princess Xenia, Mrs Soltmann
Names
- German: Kraft Alexander Ernst Ludwig Georg Emich
- House: Hohenlohe-Langenburg
- Father: Gottfried, 8th Prince of Hohenlohe-Langenburg
- Mother: Princess Margarita of Greece and Denmark

Kraft, 9th Prince of Hohenlohe-Langenburg (German: Kraft Alexander Ernst Ludwig Georg Emich Fürst zu Hohenlohe-Langenburg; 25 June 1935 – 16 March 2004), was a German prince and landowner who was titular head of the House of Hohenlohe-Langenburg. He was a nephew of Prince Philip, Duke of Edinburgh, a nephew-in-law of Queen Elizabeth II, and thus a first cousin of King Charles III.

== Early life ==
Kraft was born on 25 June 1935 in Schwäbisch Hall to Gottfried, Hereditary Prince of Hohenlohe-Langenburg, and Princess Margarita of Greece and Denmark, the eldest sister of Prince Philip, Duke of Edinburgh. The family was not invited to Philip's wedding to Princess Elizabeth of the United Kingdom in 1947, due to his parents' membership of the Nazi Party. Six years later, however and his parents and sister, Princess Beatrix, were seated in the royal box at his aunt's coronation in Westminster Abbey. He studied forestry and banking in preparation to take over the family estates.

== Activities ==
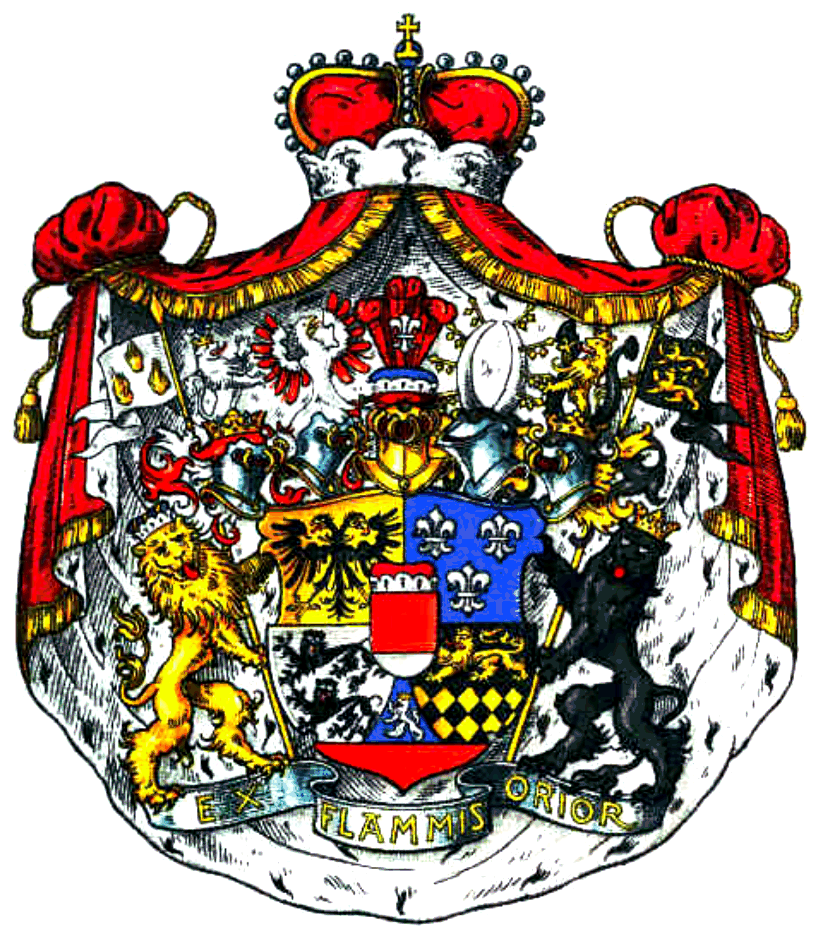
Arms of the princes of Hohenlohe-Langenburg

In 1960, Kraft succeeded his father as titular Prince of Hohenlohe-Langenburg. Despite German noble titles being abolished in the German Revolution, the title formed part of his surname and he still inherited a vast estate.

On 23 January 1963, Langenburg Castle was almost completely destroyed by fire. In 1965, he received his aunt and uncle, Queen Elizabeth II and Prince Philip, Duke of Edinburgh, at the damaged castle during their state visit to West Germany. He sold Weikersheim Palace to the state of Baden-Württemberg in 1967 to cover the cost of the restoration. His wife at the time, Charlotte, an art historian who represented Germany at Christie's, assisted in the restoration.

A well known auto enthusiast, he opened the German Automobile Museum Langenburg Castle (Deutsches Automuseum Schloss Langenburg) with race car driver Richard von Frankenberg in the castle's former stables on 20 March 1970. He also served as president of the Fédération Internationale des Véhicules Anciens from 1983 to 1996 and president of the Allgemeiner Schnauferl-Club from 1981 to 1993.

He was an elected member of the synod of the Evangelical-Lutheran Church in Württemberg from 1965 to 1974 and the district assembly of Schwäbisch Hall from 1965 to 1979. Additionally, he served as member of the board of directors of the German Red Cross from 1984 to 2000.

Kraft died on 16 March 2004, aged 68, following an illness.

== Marriage and family ==
Kraft married, firstly, Princess Charlotte of Croÿ (1938-2026) on 5 June 1965. They had three children: Cécile (born 1967); Philipp (born 1970); and Xenia (born 1972). He and Charlotte were divorced in 1990. He married, secondly, Irma Pospesch (born 1946) on 22 May 1992.

He maintained relations with his British royal relatives, attending family events such as the wedding of Prince Charles and Lady Diana Spencer in 1981 and the wedding of Prince Andrew and Sarah Ferguson in 1986.

== Ancestry ==
Ancestors of Kraft, Prince of Hohenlohe-Langenburg

8. Hermann, Prince of Hohenlohe-Langenburg
4. Ernst II, Prince of Hohenlohe-Langenburg
9. Princess Leopoldine of Baden
2. Gottfried, Prince of Hohenlohe-Langenburg
10. Alfred, Duke of Saxe-Coburg and Gotha
5. Princess Alexandra of Saxe-Coburg and Gotha
11. Grand Duchess Maria Alexandrovna of Russia
1. Kraft, Prince of Hohenlohe-Langenburg
12. George I of Greece
6. Prince Andrew of Greece and Denmark
13. Grand Duchess Olga Constantinovna of Russia
3. Princess Margarita of Greece and Denmark
14. Prince Louis of Battenberg
7. Princess Alice of Battenberg
15. Princess Victoria of Hesse and by Rhine

Kraft, 9th Prince of Hohenlohe-Langenburg House of Hohenlohe-Langenburg Cadet branch of the House of Hohenlohe Born: 25 June 1935 Died: 16 March 2004
Titles in pretence
Preceded by Gottfried	— TITULAR — Prince of Hohenlohe-Langenburg; 11 May 1960 – 16 March 2004; Reason for succession failure: German nobility titles abolished	Succeeded by Philipp
