= Stephanie von Hohenlohe =

Austrian princess and Nazi agent of influence

Stephanie
- Princess of Hohenlohe
- Stephanie von Hohenlohe in 1932
- Born: Stephany Julienne Richter; 16 September 1891; Vienna, Austria-Hungary
- Died: 13 June 1972 (aged 80); Geneva, Switzerland
- Spouse: Prince Friedrich Franz von Hohenlohe-Waldenburg-Schillingsfürst (m. 1914; div. 1920)
- Issue: Prince Franz Josef (possibly by Archduke Franz Salvator)
- Father: Johann Sebastian Richter
- Mother: Ludmilla Kuranda

Stephanie Julianne von Hohenlohe (born Stephany Julienne Richter; 16 September 1891 – 13 June 1972) was an Austrian princess by her marriage to the diplomat Prince Friedrich Franz von Hohenlohe-Waldenburg-Schillingsfürst, a member of the noble Hohenlohe family. She was born a commoner, allegedly of Jewish family background.

She relocated to London after her divorce from the prince, where she is suspected of having acted as a spy for Germany during the 1930s. She developed close connections among the Nazi hierarchy, including Adolf Hitler. She also developed other influential relationships, including with Harold Sidney Harmsworth, 1st Viscount Rothermere, and promoted British support for Germany while living in London from 1932. The British, French and Americans all suspected her of being a spy for the German state. During the 1930s, she was awarded the Golden Party Badge for her services.

Fleeing from Britain to San Francisco in 1939 after war was declared, she was put under surveillance by the US government. After the attack on Pearl Harbor she was arrested by the FBI and interned in the United States as an enemy alien. She provided information to the Office of Strategic Services which was used in a 1943 report on the personality of Adolf Hitler. In May 1945 she was released on parole and returned to Germany, where she cultivated influential connections in post-war German society.

== Early life ==
Stephany Julienne Richter was born in Vienna, Austria, to Ludmilla Kuranda (said to be Jewish) and Johann Sebastian Richter, purported to be a dentist or minor lawyer. She was named after Crown Princess Stephanie of Austria-Hungary. (Note: A 2004 biography by Martha Schad says that Richter was the illegitimate daughter of two Jewish parents.) In 1906, Stephany Richter was enrolled in the ballet school of the Vienna Court Opera. As a young woman, she used her beauty, charm and sophistication to gain an entrée to Vienna's high society.

In her early twenties, Richter had an affair with the married Archduke Franz Salvator, Prince of Tuscany. He was the son-in-law of Emperor Franz Joseph I through his marriage to Archduchess Marie Valerie of Austria.

Pregnant with Franz Salvator's child, she persuaded Friedrich Franz von Hohenlohe-Waldenburg-Schillingsfürst (1879–1958), a German prince of the Hohenlohe family, that the baby was his. They married in London on 12 May 1914, giving her the title of "princess", which she used the rest of her life. Her son was born in Vienna on 5 December 1914, and named Franz Josef. (According to an FBI memo of October 1941, the Hohenlohe family had some doubts about whether the child was theirs, but acknowledged him.) His full name was Franz Josef Rudolf Hans Weriand Max Stefan Anton von Hohenlohe-Waldenburg-Schillingsfürst.

== Interwar period ==
Princess Stephanie and her husband were divorced in 1920. Later that year in Budapest, he married Hungarian Countess Emanuela Batthyány von Német-Ujvár, in Budapest on 6 December 1920. They did not have any children. They would escape to Brazil in the closing days of World War II.

After the divorce, Princess Stephanie's surname was zu Hohenlohe-Waldenburg-Schillingsfürst, as was Austrian custom. Over the years, she always represented herself as a Hohenlohe princess. She lived in Paris until the government forced her out on suspicion of being a spy. She moved to London in 1932, settling at the exclusive Dorchester Hotel in Mayfair, London.

Meanwhile, she had developed friendships and sometimes intimate relationships with powerful and influential men, including Harold Sidney Harmsworth, 1st Viscount Rothermere, a newspaper tycoon who owned the influential Daily Mail and Daily Mirror in London, and Joachim von Ribbentrop, who served as the German Ambassador to Britain in the 1930s. She also cultivated relationships with other influential Nazi Party members. As a princess, she socialized with the British elite, connections that the Nazis believed could be valuable for their new government after they came to power in 1933.

Her close friends included Margot Asquith, the widow of the former prime minister H. H. Asquith, Lady Ethel Snowden, the wife of a former Chancellor of the Exchequer, and Lady Londonderry and her husband Charles Vane-Tempest-Stewart, 7th Marquess of Londonderry. According to The Daily Telegraph, Stephanie's "connections earned her the admiration of Hitler, Himmler and Von Ribbentrop."

After Hitler gained power in Germany in 1933, MI6 circulated a report stating that the French secret service had discovered documents in the princess's flat in Paris that ordered her to persuade Lord Rothermere to campaign for the return to Germany of territory ceded to Poland at the end of First World War. She was to receive £300,000 (the equivalent of £13 million today) if she succeeded.

Princess Stephanie received financial support from Rothermere, an early admirer of Hitler, and in the early 1930s, he advocated an alliance with Germany. In the 1930s, he paid Princess Stephanie an annual retainer of £5,000 (the equivalent of £200,000 today) to promote Germany and to develop support for it among her influential connections. He also hoped that she would introduce him to Nazi inner circles.

As war approached, Rothermere pushed for British rearmament, their association deteriorated and Rothermere stopped paying her. Princess Stephanie took him to court, alleging in a lawsuit that he had promised the retainer for life. She lost the case.

During visits to Germany, she had become closely acquainted with members of the Nazi hierarchy, including Adolf Hitler, who called her his "dear princess". She developed a close friendship with Hermann Göring, and Heinrich Himmler declared her an "honorary Aryan". In a 1938 MI6 report, British intelligence said of her, "She is frequently summoned by the Führer who appreciates her intelligence and good advice. She is perhaps the only woman who can exercise any influence on him".(That was part of a release of MI6 records in 2005 under a declassification of documents.)

In 1937 she arranged for Lord Halifax to travel to Germany and meet Göring.

In 1937 Princess Stephanie began an affair with Fritz Wiedemann, a personal aide to Hitler. When Wiedemann was appointed to the post of German Consul-General in San Francisco, she joined him in the United States in late 1937 and stayed for a time, returning to Europe the following year.

In 1938, the Nazis confiscated the property of Austrian Jews, including the Leopoldskron castle in Salzburg, which had been owned by theatre director Max Reinhardt. It was there that she received and entertained Walter Runciman, the author of the Runciman Report, which argued for handing Sudetenland over to Germany. He is reported to have spent several delightful days there. Some reported that Göring gave Princess Stephanie the property; other sources say that she leased it or was charged by Göring with developing the estate as a guest house for prominent artists and to serve as a reception facility to Hitler's Berghof home.

On June 10, 1938, he decorated her with the NSDAP's gold medal of honor.

== Second World War ==
Princess Stephanie returned to Britain in 1939, but after war was declared later that year, she left the country for fear of being arrested as a German spy. She travelled to the United States, returning to her former lover Fritz Wiedemann, then German Consul in San Francisco. On her arrival, the United States government placed her under security surveillance by the FBI.

In March 1941, she was detained for several days by US immigration authorities. She made up to Major Lemuel B. Schofield, the Director of the US Immigration and Naturalization Service in Washington, DC. He put her up in the Raleigh Hotel, where he also lived, and the two carried on an affair that lasted several months. She then lived with her mother and son in Alexandria, Virginia.

In October 1941, the FBI prepared a memo describing her as "extremely intelligent, dangerous and clever," and claiming that as a spy, she was "worse than ten thousand men". Summarizing what was known about her, it recommended that her deportation not be further delayed and noted that the British and the French, in addition to the United States intelligence community, suspected her of being a spy for Germany. She continued to stay in the US.

After the Japanese attack on Pearl Harbor and the formal entry of the US into World War II, the FBI arrested Princess Stephanie, interning her at a facility in Philadelphia and later at a Texas camp for enemy aliens. On January 10, 1942, the enemy alien hearing board in Philadelphia recommended to Attorney General Biddle that she be interned for the duration of the war, based on an interview the previous month.

She was interviewed by personnel of the new Office of Strategic Services (OSS). She was paroled in May 1945.

It was not until 2005 that British intelligence MI6 and the US FBI declassified and released some of the documents from those years and that they became available to researchers. American files show that during her interrogation by the OSS, she provided insights into the character of Hitler, which were used by Henry A. Murray, Director of the Harvard Psychological Clinic, and psychoanalyst Dr. Walter C. Langer, in preparing the 1943 OSS report entitled Analysis of the Personality of Adolph Hitler.

== Later life ==
In the postwar era, Princess Stephanie returned to Germany, where she established new, influential connections. She worked with media executives such as Henri Nannen of Stern news magazine and Axel Springer, the owner of the Axel Springer AG publishing company. For the latter, she secured interviews with US Presidents John F. Kennedy and Lyndon B. Johnson.

She died in Geneva, Switzerland, in 1972 and is buried there.

== See also ==
- Edith von Coler — similar agent of influence for Germany
- Hohenlohe-Waldenburg-Schillingsfürst
- Waldenburg (disambiguation)
