= Friedrich Franz von Hohenlohe-Waldenburg-Schillingsfürst =

Austrian prince (1879–1958)

Friedrich Franz
- Friedrich Franz von Hohenlohe-Waldenburg-Schillingsfürst
- Born: 15 February 1879; Budapest, Austria-Hungary
- Died: 24 May 1958 (aged 79); Curitiba, Brazil
- Spouse: Stephany Julienne Richter (m. 1914; div. 1920) Countess Emanuela Batthyány von Német-Ujvár (m. 1920)
- Issue: Franz Josef von Hohenlohe-Waldenburg-Schillingsfürst (possibly fathered by Archduke Franz Salvator, but acknowledged by the House of Hohenlohe)
Names
- German: Friedrich Franz Augustin Maria
- House: Hohenlohe
- Father: Chlodwig Karl von Hohenlohe-Waldenburg-Schillingsfürst
- Mother: Maria Franziska Esterházy von Galántha

Friedrich Franz von Hohenlohe-Waldenburg-Schillingsfürst (full German name: Friedrich Franz Augustin Maria Prinz zu Hohenlohe-Waldenburg-Schillingsfürst; 15 February 1879 in Budapest, Hungary – 24 May 1958 in Curitiba, Brazil) was an Austrian prince who served as a military attache in Saint Petersburg. Later he was chief of German propaganda and director of German espionage in Switzerland. He also served with his regiment on the Russian front.

He was married from 1914 to 1920 to Stephany Julienne Richter, a commoner who became a princess by marriage. In December 1920, he married Countess Emanuela Batthyány von Német-Ujvár of Hungary. They had no children. They moved to Brazil during or after the war, and lived the remainder of their lives there.

Princess Stephanie continued to use the title after they divorced. She was suspected as a spy for the German government, and operated in Europe and Britain during the late 1920s and 1930s. This was confirmed in 2005 by the release of previously secret MI5 and FBI files. Fleeing Britain in 1939 when war was declared, she spent the war years in the United States. She was arrested in 1941 when the US entered the war, and was interned from 1941 to 1945 as an enemy alien.

== Early life and marriage ==
He was the son of Chlodwig Karl Joseph Maria Prince of Hohenlohe-Waldenburg-Schillingsfürst and his wife, Countess Maria Franziska Anna Theresia Hedwig Countess Esterházy of Galántha. Educated as part of the aristocracy, Prince Friedrich was appointed military attache at the Austro-Hungarian Embassy in Saint Petersburg, then the Russian capital. According to MI5 files released in 2005, during the First World War Prince Friedrich became involved in spying as chief of German propaganda and director of German espionage in Switzerland.

There he became involved with Stephanie Richter, a young Austrian woman from Vienna, who was beautiful and charming, and Jewish by birth (her mother). Stephanie, then 23 although claiming to be 17, soon told him she was pregnant, but not that it was by another man. The royal family could not risk a scandal, and, with the impending birth, the marriage could not be long delayed. They arranged for the couple to marry quietly in London. The wedding was held on 12 May 1914 in the Roman Catholic Westminster Cathedral.

Richter was reasonably well off and settled the prince's not inconsiderable gambling debts. She also helped to maintain their lifestyle. On 5 December 1914, her son, named Franz Josef von Hohenlohe, was born in Vienna. His full name was Franz Josef Rudolf Hans Weriand Max Stefan Anton von Hohenlohe-Waldenburg-Schillingsfürst. Stephanie and her family returned to Vienna.

Her husband joined his regiment. Using her contacts, Princess Stephanie arranged to be posted to the Russian front, where she worked in a field hospital at Lemberg, which had just been recaptured from the Russians.

Two years after the end of the First World War, the shot-gun marriage ended. On 20 July 1920 Prince Friedrich's divorce was formalised in Budapest. Later that year Prince Frederick married Countess Emanuela Batthyány von Német-Ujvár from Hungary. They had no children.

His former wife always referred to herself as Princess Stephanie. She was suspected by French, British and American intelligence of being a spy for the German government during the 1930s, after developing close relationships with the Nazi elite, despite her Jewish birth. From 1932 she lived in London. She became involved with powerful and influential men, such as the Anglo-Irish Harold Sidney Harmsworth, 1st Viscount Rothermere, (1868–1940), who ran influential newspapers in London and promoted support for Germany. Princess Stephanie fled England after war was declared, joining a former lover in the United States. After the attack at Pearl Harbor and US entry into the war, she was arrested by the FBI and interned as an enemy alien, being paroled in May 1945. She returned to Germany and established new influential relationships. She died in Geneva, Switzerland in 1972 and is buried there.

== Family and death ==
Friedrich Franz Hohenlohe-Waldenburg-Schillingsfürst usually went by his middle name of Franz. He had four siblings, two brothers and two sisters. His elder brother Nikolaus Moritz Aloys Hubertus Maria zu Hohenlohe-Waldenburg-Schillingsfürst (1877–1948) was the head of the family.

Prince Friedrich and his second wife had no children. They moved to Curitiba, Brazil in the closing days of World War II. He died there on 24 May 1958, and his wife also died in Brazil.

== Ancestry ==
Ancestors of Friedrich Franz von Hohenlohe-Waldenburg-Schillingsfürst

8. Karl Albrecht III, 4th Prince of Hohenlohe-Waldenburg-Schillingsfürst
4. Friedrich Karl I, 5th Prince Hohenlohe-Waldenburg-Schillingsfürst
9. Princess Leopoldine of Fürstenberg
2. Chlodwig Karl, Prince of Hohenlohe-Waldenburg-Schillingsfürst
10. Franz Josef, 5th Prince of Hohenlohe-Schillingsfürst
5. Princess Therese of Hohenlohe-Schillingsfürst
11. Princess Constanze of Hohenlohe-Langenburg
1. Friedrich Franz, Prince of Hohenlohe-Waldenburg-Schillingsfürst
12. Count Miklos Janos Esterházy of Galántha
6. Count Moriz Esterházy of Galántha
13. Marie Françoise de Roisin de Baudry
3. Countess Maria Franziska Esterházy of Galántha
14. August Longin, Prince of Lobkowicz
7. Princess Polyxena of Lobkowicz
15. Princess Bertha of Schwarzenberg

== Bibliography ==
- Jim Wilson: Nazi Princess. Hitler, Lord Rothermere and Princess Stephanie von Hohenlohe, The History Press, 2011, ISBN 0752461141
- Martha Schad, Hitler's Spy Princess: The Extraordinary Life of Princess Stephanie Von Hohenlohe (translated by Angus McGeoch), Haynes, 2004. ISBN 978-0-7509-3514-2 (first published in German as Hitlers Spionin: das Leben der Stephanie von Hohenlohe)
