= Philipp, Prince of Hohenlohe-Langenburg =

Philipp

Prince of Hohenlohe-Langenburg
- Tenure: 16 March 2004 – present
- Predecessor: Kraft, Prince of Hohenlohe-Langenburg
- Heir apparent: Max, Hereditary Prince of Hohenlohe-Langenburg
- Born: 20 January 1970 (age 56); Crailsheim, West Germany
- Spouse: Saskia Binder (m. 2003)
- Issue: Max, Hereditary Prince of Hohenlohe-Langenburg; Prince Gustav of Hohenlohe-Langenburg; Princess Marita of Hohenlohe-Langenburg
Names
- Philipp Gottfried Alexander
- House: Hohenlohe-Langenburg
- Father: Kraft, Prince of Hohenlohe-Langenburg
- Mother: Princess Charlotte of Croÿ

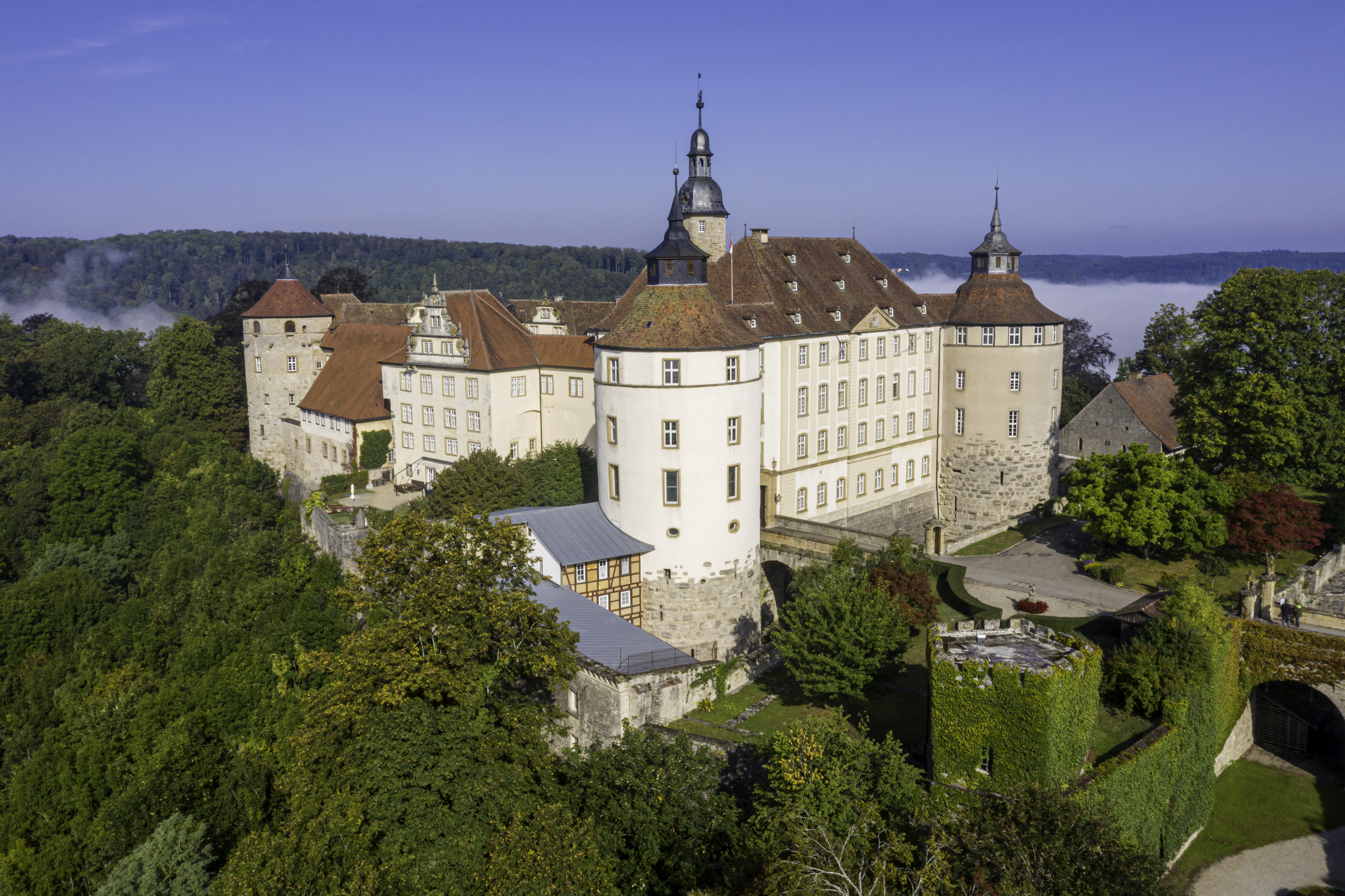
Langenburg Castle

Philipp, Prince of Hohenlohe-Langenburg (Philipp Gottfried Alexander; born 20 January 1970), is the head of the House of Hohenlohe-Langenburg, since the death of his father in 2004.

== Early life and ancestry ==
He was born in Crailsheim, West Germany, the middle child and only son of Kraft, Prince of Hohenlohe-Langenburg (1935–2004) and his first wife, Princess Charlotte of Croÿ (b. 1938). Paternally, he is a grandson of Princess Margarita of Greece and Denmark, and a grandnephew of Prince Philip, Duke of Edinburgh, whose funeral he attended. Anne, Princess Royal is one of his godmothers. Queen Elizabeth II regularly invited him to Royal Ascot and the winter hunt at Sandringham House. With his wife Saskia and sister Xenia, he attended the state funeral of Queen Elizabeth II at Westminster Abbey, London, on 19 September, 2022. Maternally, he is the grandson of Prince Alexander of Croy (1912–2002) and his Scottish wife, Anna Elspeth Campbell (1917–1986), granddaughter of Archibald Campbell, 6th of Glendaruel.

His decision to set up 24 large wind turbines in his forest is controversial. He sought public support from (then) Charles, Prince of Wales, the current King Charles III, and from former vice chancellor and foreign minister Joschka Fischer of the Green Party, who both attended a conference at Langenburg Castle in 2013. Together with Fischer he founded the Langenburg Forum for Sustainability which cooperates with Charles' International Sustainability Unit.

Langenburg castle is partially open to the public, including the state rooms and a museum of classic cars.

== Marriage and issue ==
He married Saskia Binder (b. 15 January 1973 in Munich), daughter of former Deutsche Bank Munich director Hans Peter Binder, on 6 September 2003 in a civil ceremony at Langenburg. They married in a religious ceremony on 13 September 2003 in Diessen am Ammersee. The couple have two sons and a daughter.

Philipp, Prince of Hohenlohe-Langenburg House of Hohenlohe-Langenburg Cadet branch of the House of Hohenlohe Born: 20 January 1970
Titles in pretence
Preceded by Kraft	— TITULAR — Prince of Hohenlohe-Langenburg; 16 March 2004 – present Reason for succession failure: German nobility titles abolished	Incumbent; Heir: Max-Leopold of Hohenlohe-Langenburg
