= Princess Adelaide of Saxe-Meiningen (born 1891) =

Princess of Saxe-Meiningen (1891–1971)

Adelaide of Saxe-Meiningen
- Princess Adalbert of Prussia
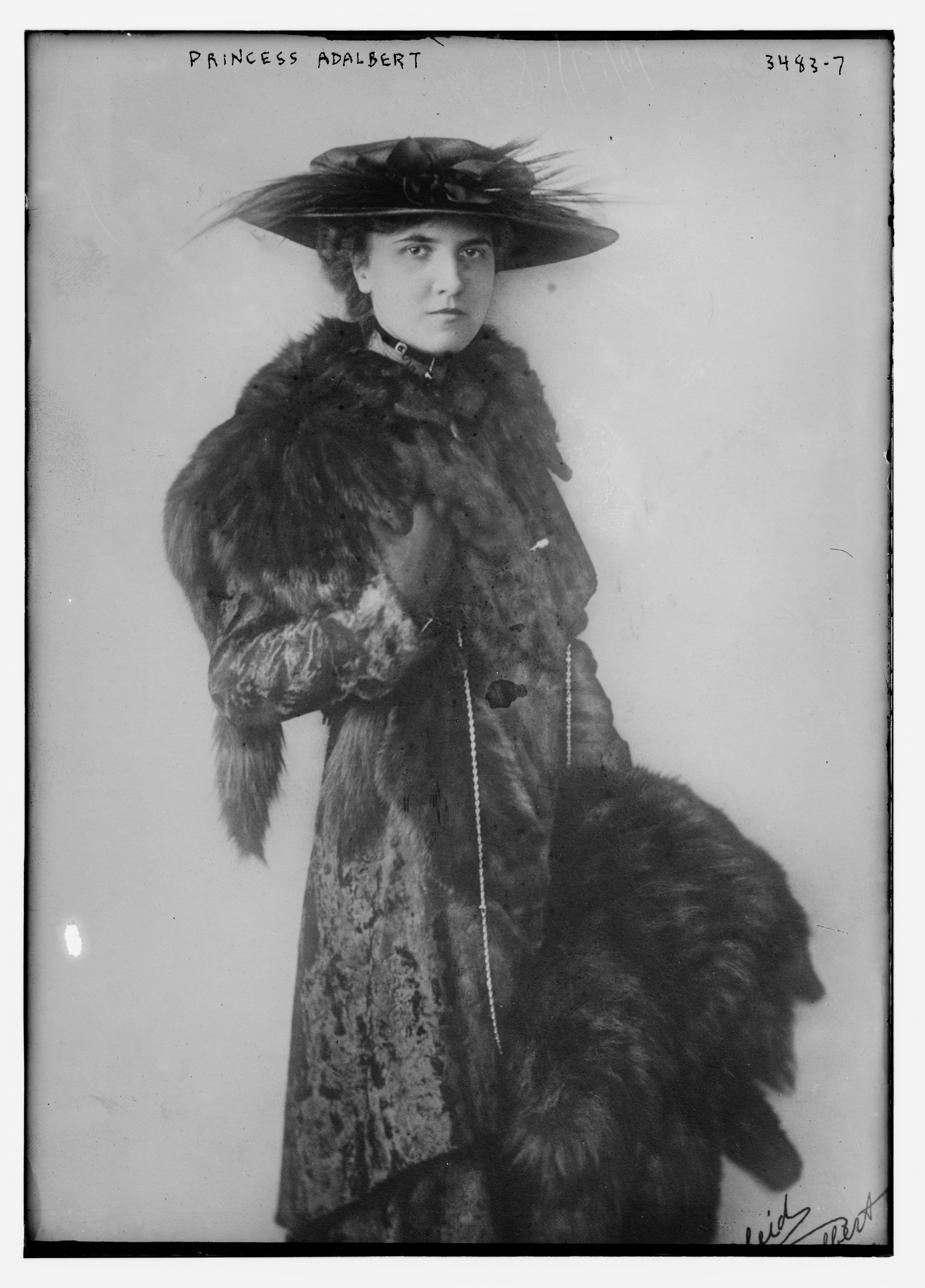
- Princess Adelaide in 1910
- Born: 16 August 1891; Kassel
- Died: 25 April 1971 (aged 79); La Tour-de-Peilz, Vaud, Switzerland
- Burial: 30 April 1971; Vassin Cemetery, La Tour-de-Peilz, Vaud, Switzerland
- Spouse: Prince Adalbert of Prussia (m. 1914; died 1948)
- Issue: Princess Victoria Marina; Princess Victoria Marina; Prince Wilhelm Victor
Names
- German: Adelheid Erna Karoline Marie Elisabeth Prinzessin von Sachsen-Meiningen
- House: Saxe-Meiningen
- Father: Prince Friedrich Johann of Saxe-Meiningen
- Mother: Countess Adelaide of Lippe-Biesterfeld

Princess Adelaide of Saxe-Meiningen (Adelaide Erna Caroline Marie Elisabeth; 16 August 1891 – 25 April 1971), later Princess Adalbert of Prussia, was the daughter of Prince Frederick John of Saxe-Meiningen and Countess Adelaide of Lippe-Biesterfeld.

== Family ==
Adelaide (original German: Adelheid)'s father Prince Frederick was a younger son of George II of Saxe-Meiningen by his second wife Feodora of Hohenlohe-Langenburg. She had five siblings, including Prince George, a prisoner of war killed during World War II, and Prince Bernard.

Adelaide's mother, also named Adelaide, was the eldest child of Ernst, Count of Lippe-Biesterfeld, who was the Regent of the principality of Lippe for seven years (1897–1904).

== Marriage ==
On 3 August 1914, at the beginning of World War I, Adelaide married Prince Adalbert of Prussia at Wilhelmshaven, Schleswig-Holstein, Germany. He was the third son of Kaiser William II of Germany. Adelaide's father would die within a month, on 23 August 1914. Less than a month after their marriage, Prince Adalbert was reported to have been killed in battle in Brussels. This was only a rumor however, and the prince had been unharmed. In March 1915, he was promoted to Captain in the navy and Major in the army.

She and Prince Adalbert had three children:

- Princess Victoria Marina of Prussia (b. and d. 4 September 1915) she died soon after birth, although Adelaide was reported to have been in "satisfactory condition".
- Princess Victoria Marina of Prussia (11 September 1917 – 21 January 1981), who married and had children
- Prince Wilhelm Victor of Prussia (15 February 1919 – 7 February 1989), who married and had children

== Later life ==
After William II abdicated in 1918 at the end of World War I, Prince Adalbert sought refuge on his yacht, which had been maintained by a loyal crew. Princess Adelaide and their children soon attempted to follow, travelling by train from Kiel. They were delayed however, and eventually came to be staying in southern Bavaria with Prince Henry of Bavaria (a grandson of Ludwig III of Bavaria) and his wife. She and Prince Adalbert were later reunited.

Princess Adelaide died on 25 April 1971 in La Tour-de-Peilz, Switzerland. Her husband had died 23 years earlier, on 22 September 1948, at the same location.

== Ancestry ==
Ancestors of Princess Adelaide of Saxe-Meiningen (born 1891)

8. Bernhard II, Duke of Saxe-Meiningen
4. Georg II, Duke of Saxe-Meiningen
9. Princess Marie Frederica of Hesse-Kassel
2. Prince Friedrich of Saxe-Meiningen
10. Ernst I, Prince of Hohenlohe-Langenburg
5. Princess Feodora of Hohenlohe-Langenburg
11. Princess Feodora of Leiningen
1. Princess Adelaide of Saxe-Meiningen
12. Julius, Count of Lippe-Biesterfeld
6. Ernest, Count of Lippe-Biesterfeld
13. Countess Adelheid of Castell-Castell
3. Countess Adelaide of Lippe-Biesterfeld
14. Leopold Otto, Count von Wartensleben
7. Countess Karoline von Wartensleben
15. Mathilde Halbach
