= Georg, Prince of Saxe-Meiningen =

Georg
- Prince of Saxe-Meiningen
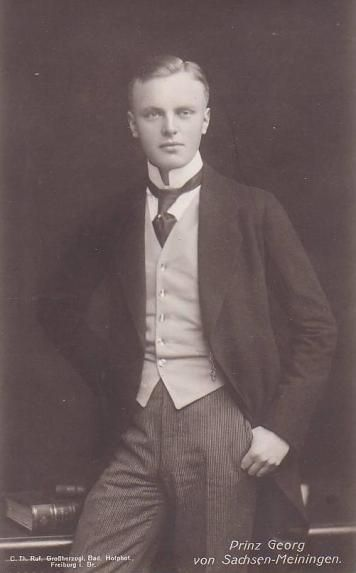

Head of the House of Saxe-Meiningen
- Tenure: 29 December 1941 – 6 January 1946
- Predecessor: Prince Ernst
- Successor: Prince Bernhard
- Born: 11 October 1892; Kassel
- Died: 6 January 1946 (aged 53); Cherepovets, USSR
- Spouse: Countess Klara Marie von Korff genannt Schmising-Kerssenbrock (m. 1919)
- Issue: Prince Anton Ulrich; Prince Frederick Alfred; Princess Marie Elisabeth; Regina, Crown Princess of Austria
- House: Saxe-Meiningen
- Father: Frederick Johann of Saxe-Meiningen
- Mother: Adelaide of Lippe-Biesterfeld

Georg, Prince of Saxe-Meiningen (11 October 1892 – 6 January 1946) was the head of the house of Saxe-Meiningen from 1941 until his death.

== Biography ==
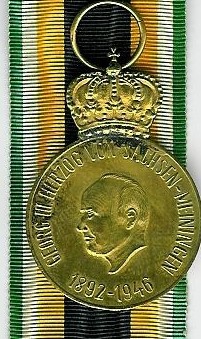
A Medal with the depiction of Prince George, issued in 1978 (obverse)

He was born in Kassel as the eldest son of Prince Frederick Johann of Saxe-Meiningen (1861-1914) and Countess Adelaide of Lippe-Biesterfeld (1870–1948). His father was a son of Georg II, Duke of Saxe-Meiningen and his mother a daughter of Count Ernst of Lippe-Biesterfeld. Georg studied law at the Ludwig-Maximilians-Universität München and the University of Jena.

Georg suspended his studies to serve in World War I and saw action as a captain in a cavalry regiment. His uncle Bernhard III abdicated on 10 November 1918 following the German Revolution as the German monarchies were abolished. After the war he resumed his law studies and for a time served as a substitute judge for the town of Hildburghausen in the Free State of Thuringia. On 1 May 1933 he joined the Nazis, becoming NSDAP member (# 2.594.794).

After the death of his uncle Ernst on 29 December 1941, Georg succeeded to the headship of the house of Saxe-Meiningen and assumed the title of Duke of Saxe-Meiningen and style Georg III.

Georg and his family were expropriated without compensation in 1945. Georg, who served as a major in the Wehrmacht died in the Russian prisoner of war camp near Cherepovets (Tscherepowetz in German) in Northern Russia. His heir was his second and only surviving son Prince Frederick Alfred who renounced the succession, being a monk in 1953, allowing it to pass to his uncle Bernhard.

== Marriage and children ==
He was married in Freiburg im Breisgau on 22 February 1919 to Countess Klara Marie von Korff genannt Schmising-Kerssenbrock (Darmstadt, 31 May 1895 – Högerhof bei Türnitz, Lower Austria, 10 February 1992), daughter of Count Alfred von Korff genannt Schmising-Kerssenbrock and Baroness Helene von Hilgers. They had four children:

Name	Birth	Death	Notes
Prince Anton Ulrich of Saxe-Meiningen	23 December 1919	20 May 1940 (aged 20)	Killed in Action at Albert-sur-Somme during World War II
Prince Frederick Alfred of Saxe-Meiningen	5 April 1921	18 September 1997 (aged 76)	Renounced the succession allowing it to pass to his uncle. A Carthusian monk since 1953.
Princess Marie Elisabeth	18 December 1922	31 March 1923 (3 months 13 days)	
Princess Regina of Saxe-Meiningen	6 January 1925	3 February 2010 (aged 85)	She married Otto von Habsburg on 10 May 1951 and had issue.

== Ancestry ==
Ancestors of Georg, Prince of Saxe-Meiningen

16. Georg I, Duke of Saxe-Meiningen
8. Bernhard II, Duke of Saxe-Meiningen
17. Princess Louise Eleonore of Hohenlohe-Langenburg
4. Georg II, Duke of Saxe-Meiningen
18. William II, Elector of Hesse
9. Princess Marie Frederica of Hesse-Kassel
19. Princess Augusta of Prussia
2. Prince Friedrich of Saxe-Meiningen
20. Karl Ludwig, Prince of Hohenlohe-Langenburg
10. Ernst I, Prince of Hohenlohe-Langenburg
21. Countess Amalie Henriette of Solms-Baruth
5. Princess Feodora of Hohenlohe-Langenburg
22. Emich Carl, Prince of Leiningen
11. Princess Feodora of Leiningen
23. Princess Victoria of Saxe-Coburg-Saalfeld
1. Georg, Prince of Saxe-Meiningen
24. Ernst, Count of Lippe-Biesterfeld
12. Julius, Count of Lippe-Biesterfeld
25. Modeste von Unruh
6. Ernest, Count of Lippe-Biesterfeld
26. Friedrich Ludwig, Count of Castell-Castell
13. Countess Adelheid of Castell-Castell
27. Princess Emilie of Hohenlohe-Langenburg
3. Countess Adelaide of Lippe-Biesterfeld
28. Cäsar Alexander, Count von Wartensleben
14. Leopold Otto, Count von Wartensleben
29. Friederike von Gfug
7. Countess Karoline von Wartensleben
30. Arnold Halbach
15. Mathilde Halbach
31. Johanna Caroline Bohlen

Georg, Prince of Saxe-Meiningen House of Saxe-Meiningen Cadet branch of the House of Wettin Born: 11 October 1892 Died: 6 January 1946
Titles in pretence
Preceded by Prince Ernest	— TITULAR — Duke of Saxe-Meiningen; 29 December 1941 – 6 January 1946; Reason for succession failure: Duchy abolished in 1918	Succeeded by Prince Bernard
