= Duke Leopold =

Duke Leopold may be

- Leopold IV, Duke of Bavaria (d. 1141)
- Leopold, Duke of Austria
  - Leopold V, Duke of Austria (d. 1194)
  - Leopold VI, Duke of Austria (d. 1230)
  - Leopold I, Duke of Austria of Habsburg (d. 1326)
  - Leopold III, Duke of Austria (d. 1386)
  - Leopold IV, Duke of Austria (d. 1411)
  - Archduke Leopold Wilhelm of Austria (d. 1662)
  - Leopold V, Archduke of Austria (d. 1632)
- Leopold I, Grand Duke of Tuscany (=Leopold II, Holy Roman Emperor)
- Leopold, Duke of Lorraine (d. 1729)
- Leopold, Duke of Lorraine (d. 1817)
- Leopold, Grand Duke of Baden (d. 1852)
- Leopold, Duke of Lorraine (d. 1869)
- Leopold II, Grand Duke of Tuscany (d. 1870)
- Leopold IV, Duke of Anhalt (d. 1871)
- Prince Leopold, Duke of Albany (d. 1884)

== See also ==
- Leopold of Habsburg (disambiguation)
- Leopold of Austria (disambiguation)
- Leopold I (disambiguation)
- Leopold II (disambiguation)
- Leopold III (disambiguation)
- Leopold IV (disambiguation)
