= Bernhard, Prince of Saxe-Meiningen =

Bernhard (IV)
- Prince of Saxe-Meiningen

Head of the House of Saxe-Meiningen
- Tenure: 6 January 1946 – 4 October 1984
- Predecessor: Prince Georg
- Successor: Prince Konrad
- Born: 30 June 1901; Köln, Germany
- Died: 4 October 1984 (aged 83); Bad Krozingen, Germany
- Spouse: Margot Grössler (m. 1931; div. 1947) Baroness Vera Schäffer of Bernstein (m. 1948)
- Issue Detail: Feodora Prinzessin von Sachsen-Meiningen; Frederick Ernest Prinz von Sachsen-Meiningen; Princess Eleonore; Prince Konrad; Princess Almut
Names
- Bernhard Friedrich Julius Heinrich
- House: Saxe-Meiningen
- Father: Prince Frederick Johann of Saxe-Meiningen
- Mother: Princess Adelaide of Lippe

Bernhard, Prince of Saxe-Meiningen (German: Bernhard, Prinz von Sachsen-Meiningen; 30 June 1901 – 4 October 1984) was the head of the House of Saxe-Meiningen from 1946 until his death.

== Prince of Saxe-Meiningen ==
Bernhard was born in Köln the third son of Prince Frederick Johann of Saxe-Meiningen and Countess Adelaide of Lippe-Biesterfeld. His father was the second son of Georg II, Duke of Saxe-Meiningen and his mother a daughter of Count Ernst of Lippe-Biesterfeld.

After the death of his older brother Prince Georg in 1946 his nephew Prince Frederick Alfred renounced his succession rights and so Bernhard succeeded to the headship of the house of Saxe-Meiningen and the nominal title of Duke of Saxe-Meiningen (as Bernhard IV).

As his first marriage was morganatic his second son Prince Frederick Konrad succeeded him as head of the ducal house following his death in Bad Krozingen.

Bernhard and his first wife were declared guilty of a Nazi conspiracy against Austria in 1933; he was sentenced to six weeks in prison, while she was placed under house arrest. After intervention of the German envoy, he was released from prison, upon which they escaped to Italy. Three weeks later he was arrested while trying to return to his castle of Pitzelstaetten.

== Family ==
Bernhard was married morganatically to Margot Grössler (1911–1998), from Wrocław, daughter of Friedrich Grössler, a merchant, and Erika Wägner, in Eichenhof im Riesengebirge on 25 April 1931. This union ended in divorce on 10 June 1947. They had two children, both of whom had no succession rights:

- Princess Feodora of Saxe-Meiningen (27 April 1932) she married Burkhard Kippenberg on 6 April 1967. They have one son:
  - Walter Johannes Kippenberg (27 January 1968)
- Prince Frederick Ernest of Saxe-Meiningen (21 January 1935 – 13 July 2004) he married Ehrengard von Massow on 3 March 1962. He remarried Princess Beatrice of Saxe-Coburg and Gotha on 12 June 1977. He has two children and one grandson by his second wife:
  - Princess Marie Alexandra of Saxe-Meiningen (5 July 1978) married Benno Beat Christian Wiedmer on 27 July 2004.
  - Prince Friedrich Constantin of Saxe-Meiningen (3 June 1980) He has one son with his wife, Sophia Lupus (born in 1995):
    - Prince Michael of Saxe-Meiningen (July 2015)

Bernhard married secondly in Ziegenberg über Bad Nauheim on 11 August 1948 to Baroness Vera Schäffer von Bernstein (1914–1994), daughter of Baron Friedrich "Fritz" Schäffer von Bernstein (1868–1958) and Emma Carola, née Passavant (1884–1971). They had three children, including a son, Konrad, with full rights to the succession to the house of Saxe-Meiningen:

- Princess Eleonore Adelaide of Saxe-Meiningen (9 November 1950) she married Peter Eric Rosden on 22 October 1982.
- Prince Frederick Konrad of Saxe-Meiningen (14 April 1952) unmarried and without issue, head of the House of Saxe-Meiningen since 4 October 1984.
- Princess Almut of Saxe-Meiningen (25 September 1959) she married Eberhard von Braunschweig on 16 October 1993. They have two children:
  - Marie Cecilie von Braunschweig (4 August 1994)
  - Julius-Alexander von Braunschweig (20 October 1996)

== Ancestry ==
Ancestors of Bernhard, Prince of Saxe-Meiningen

8. Bernhard II, Duke of Saxe-Meiningen
4. Georg II, Duke of Saxe-Meiningen
9. Princess Marie Frederica of Hesse-Kassel
2. Prince Friedrich of Saxe-Meiningen
10. Ernst I, Prince of Hohenlohe-Langenburg
5. Princess Feodora of Hohenlohe-Langenburg
11. Princess Feodora of Leiningen
1. Bernhard, Prince of Saxe-Meiningen
12. Julius, Count of Lippe-Biesterfeld
6. Ernest, Count of Lippe-Biesterfeld
13. Countess Adelheid of Castell-Castell
3. Countess Adelaide of Lippe-Biesterfeld
14. Count Leopold Otto von Wartensleben
7. Countess Karoline von Wartensleben
15. Mathilde Halbach

Bernhard, Prince of Saxe-Meiningen House of Saxe-Meiningen Cadet branch of the House of Wettin Born: 30 June 1901 Died: 4 October 1984
Titles in pretence
Preceded by Prince Georg	— TITULAR — Duke of Saxe-Meiningen; 6 January 1946 – 4 October 1984; Reason for succession failure: Duchy abolished in 1918	Succeeded by Prince Konrad
