= Countess Adelaide of Lippe-Biesterfeld =

German noblewoman (1870–1948)

Countess Adelaide
- Princess Friedrich of Saxe-Meiningen
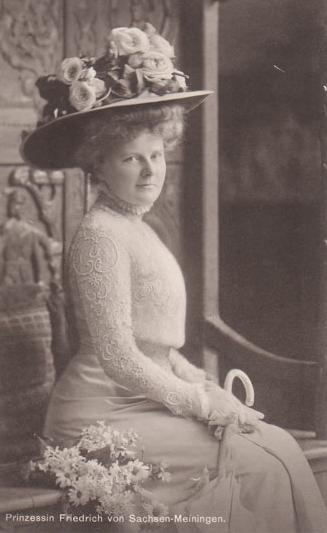
- Photograph, 1911
- Born: 22 June 1870; Oberkassel, Bonn, Prussia, North German Confederation
- Died: 3 September 1948 (aged 78); Detmold, British occupation zone in Germany
- Burial: Christuskirche
- Spouse: Prince Friedrich of Saxe-Meiningen (m. 1889; died 1914)
- Issue: Feodora, Grand Duchess of Saxe-Weimar-Eisenach; Adelaide, Princess Adalbert of Prussia; Georg, Prince of Saxe-Meiningen; Prince Ernst Leopold; Princess Luise Marie; Bernhard, Prince of Saxe-Meiningen
Names
- Adelheid Karoline Mathilde Emilie Agnes Ida Sophie
- House: Lippe
- Father: Ernest, Count of Lippe-Biesterfeld
- Mother: Countess Karoline of Wartensleben

Countess Adelaide of Lippe-Biesterfeld (22 June 1870 – 3 September 1948) was the eldest child of Ernest II, Count of Lippe-Biesterfeld and Countess Karoline von Wartensleben.

== Family and early life ==
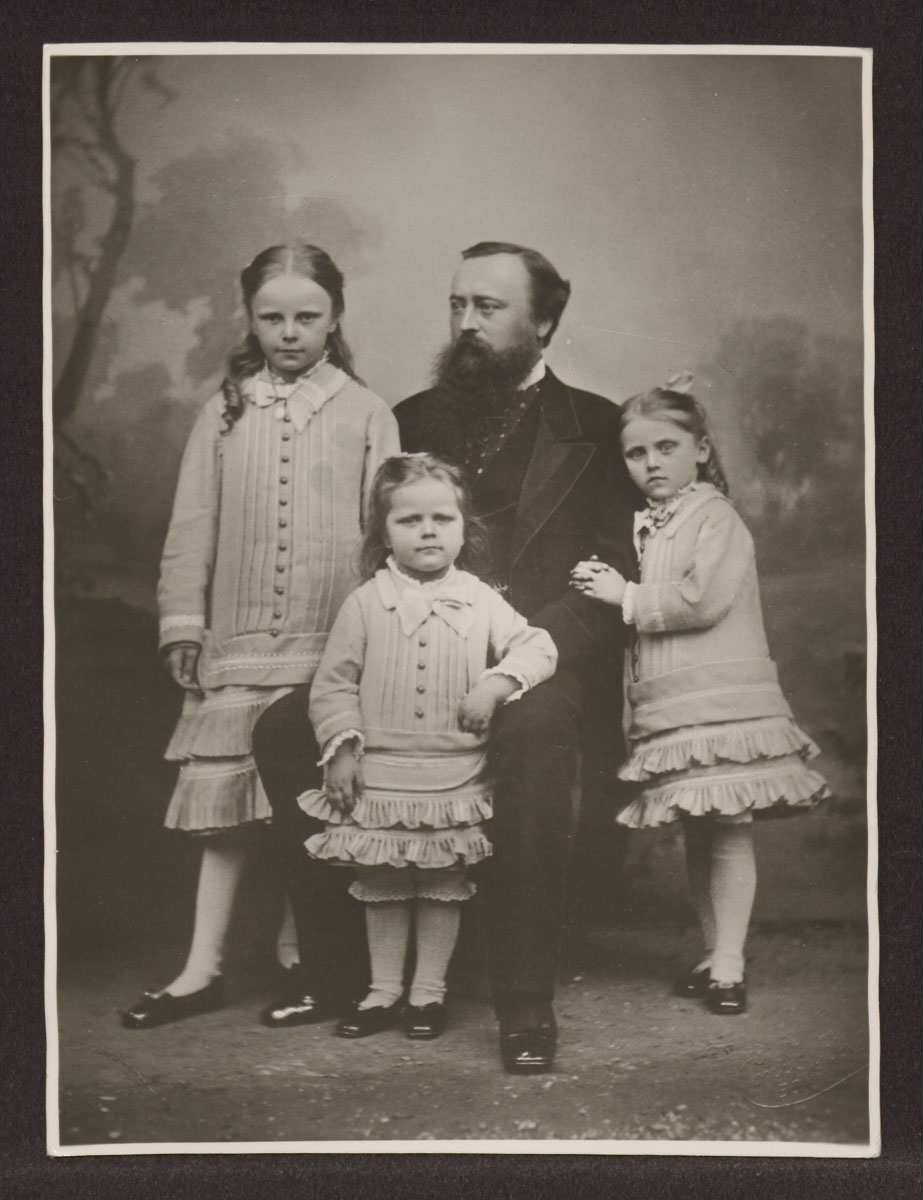
Adelaide with her father and two sisters.

Adelaide was born on 22 June 1870 to Ernest II, Count of Lippe-Biesterfeld and his wife, Countess Karoline von Wartensleben.

After the death of Woldemar, Prince of Lippe in 1895, her parents were involved in a regency and succession dispute to the principality of Lippe. Though Woldemar's younger brother Alexander succeeded, he was incapable of ruling due to a mental illness. Consequently, two branches of the House of Lippe argued over rights to a regency. Prince Adolf of Schaumburg-Lippe, a brother-in-law of Wilhelm II, German Emperor was chosen, but a court-settlement allowed Ernest to become the regent of Lippe-Detmold on 17 July 1897.

== Marriage and issue ==
At Neudorf, Adelaide married Prince Friedrich Johann of Saxe-Meiningen, son of Georg II, Duke of Saxe-Meiningen, on 24 April 1889. They had six children together:

Name	Birth	Death	Notes
Feodora Karola Charlotte Marie Adelaide Auguste Mathilde	29 May 1890	12 March 1972	married on 21 January 1910 to Wilhelm Ernst, Grand Duke of Saxe-Weimar-Eisenach.
Adelaide Erna Karoline Marie Elisabeth	16 August 1891	25 April 1971	married on 3 August 1914 to Prince Adalbert of Prussia.
Georg, Prince of Saxe-Meiningen	11 October 1892	6 January 1946	Died as a POW in Russian camp of Cherepovets, Soviet Union; married Countess Klara Marie von Korff genannt Schmising-Kerssenbrock; had issue including Princess Regina of Saxe-Meiningen, wife of Crown Prince Otto of Austria.
Ernst Leopold Friedrich Wilhelm Otto	23 September 1895	17 August 1914	Killed in action, near Maubeuge, France
Luise Marie Elisabeth Mathilde Helene Katharine	13 March 1899	14 February 1985	married on 25 October 1936 to Baron Götz von Wangenheim
Bernhard, Prince of Saxe-Meiningen	30 June 1901	4 October 1984	married firstly Margot Grössler (morganatic) and secondly Baroness Vera Schäffer von Bernstein (equal marriage)

== Role in Lippe succession dispute ==
Two branches of the House of Lippe debated over rights to the principality of Lippe-Detmold.

As Adelaide's great-grandmother was a member of the lower nobility (Modeste Christiane von Unruh) and has one quarter commoner ancestry, her family's claim to full royalty was challenged. This claim threatened the succession to Saxe-Meiningen, as Adelaide was married to the Duke of Saxe-Meiningen's heir apparent; were her father deemed a lesser royal status, it might be thought that her own claim was not equal enough for her husband's family.

== Ancestry ==
Ancestors of Countess Adelaide of Lippe-Biesterfeld

8. Ernst, Count of Lippe-Biesterfeld
4. Julius, Count of Lippe-Biesterfeld
9. Modeste Christiane von Unruh
2. Ernest, Count of Lippe-Biesterfeld
10. Friedrich Ludwig, Count of Castell-Castell
5. Countess Adelheid of Castell-Castell
11. Princess Emilie of Hohenlohe-Langenburg
1. Countess Adelaide of Lippe-Biesterfeld
12. Count Cäsar Alexander von Wartensleben
6. Count Leopold Otto von Wartensleben
13. Friederike von Gfug, Heiress of Osniszczewo
3. Countess Karoline von Wartensleben
14. Arnold Halbach
7. Mathilde Halbach
15. Johanna Caroline Mathilda Bohlen
