= Prince Bernhard of Lippe (1872–1934) =

German prince (1872–1934); father-in-law of Queen Juliana of the Netherlands

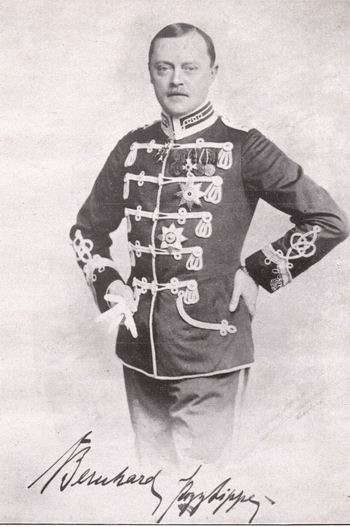
- Prince Bernhard of Lippe ca. 1909
- Born: 26 August 1872; Oberkassel, Kingdom of Prussia, German Empire
- Died: 19 June 1934 (aged 61); Munich, Nazi Germany
- Spouse: Armgard of Sierstorpff-Cramm (m. 1909)
- Issue: Bernhard, Prince of the Netherlands; Prince Aschwin of Lippe-Biesterfeld
Names
- German: Bernhard Kasimir Friedrich Gustav Heinrich Wilhelm Eduard
- House: House of Lippe
- Father: Ernest II, Count of Lippe-Biesterfeld
- Mother: Countess Karoline of Wartensleben

Prince Bernhard of Lippe (Bernhard Kasimir Wilhelm Friedrich Gustav Heinrich Eduard; 26 August 1872 – 19 June 1934) was a member of the Lippe-Biesterfeld line of the House of Lippe. He was the father of Prince Bernhard of Lippe-Biesterfeld, the prince consort of Queen Juliana of the Netherlands.

== Biography ==
Prince Bernhard of Lippe, born as Count of Lippe-Biesterfeld in Oberkassel on 26 August 1872, was the 2nd son of Ernest II, Count of Lippe-Biesterfeld, regent (1897–1904) of Principality of Lippe, and his wife Countess Karoline von Wartensleben. He was a younger brother of Leopold IV, Prince of Lippe, who succeeded as reigning Prince of Lippe in 1905. He pursued a career as a soldier, serving in the Prussian Army, and attaining the rank of major.

The Lippe-Biesterfeld family had lived at Oberkassel, Bonn, ever since 1770, when count Frederick William (1737–1803) had married Elisabeth Johanna, Edle von Meinertzhagen (1752–1811), who inherited a small manor house at Oberkassel where the couple moved from Biesterfeld in 1770, and which became the home to the family for the following 209 years. Beethoven is said to have been a piano teacher to the couples' children. The manor house and farm at Biesterfeld were demolished around 1820. Prince Bernhard acquired the Reckenwalde castle in eastern Brandenburg (today Wojnowo, Poland), the family's new estate, where his children grew up.

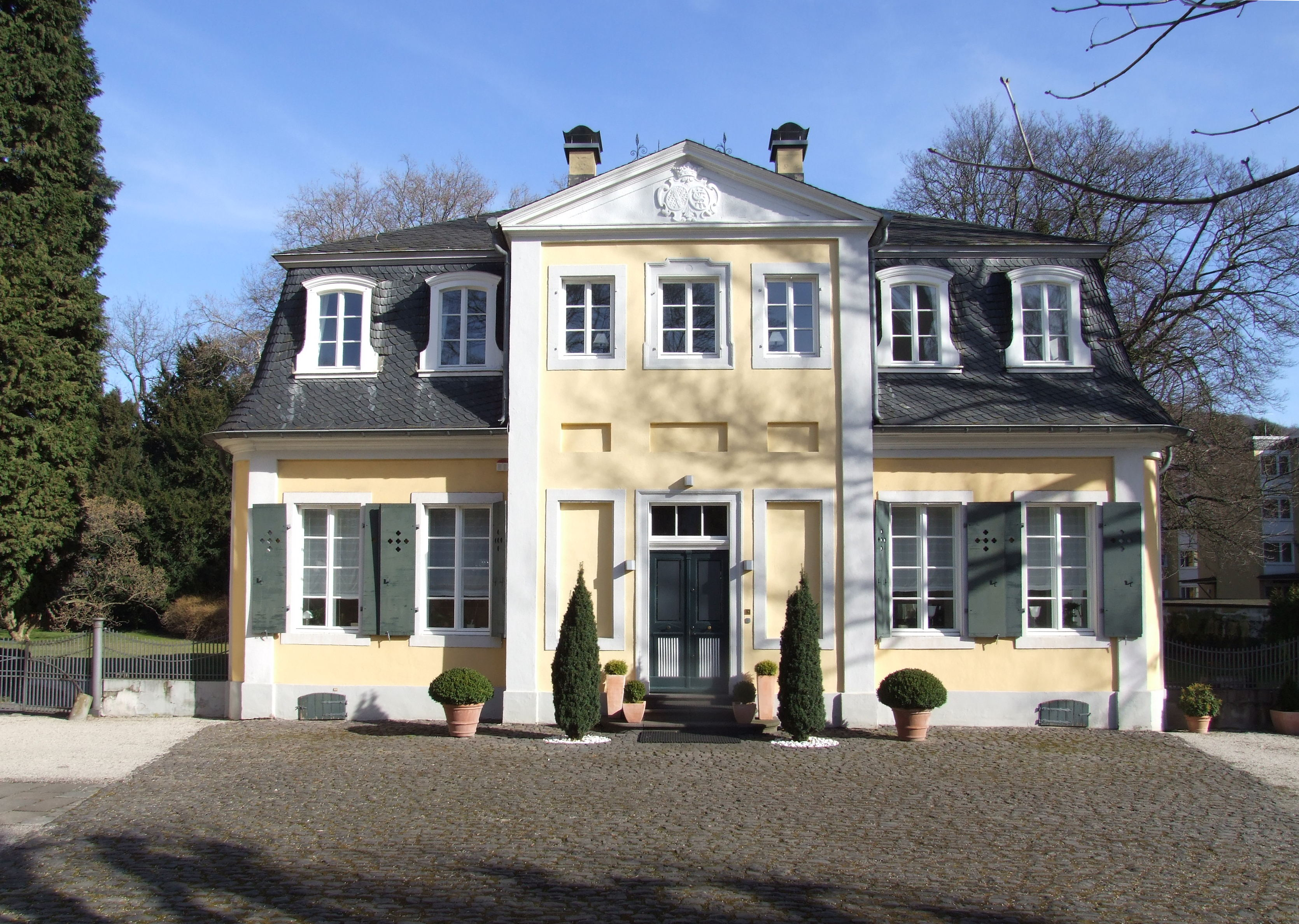
Lippe House at Oberkassel, Bonn

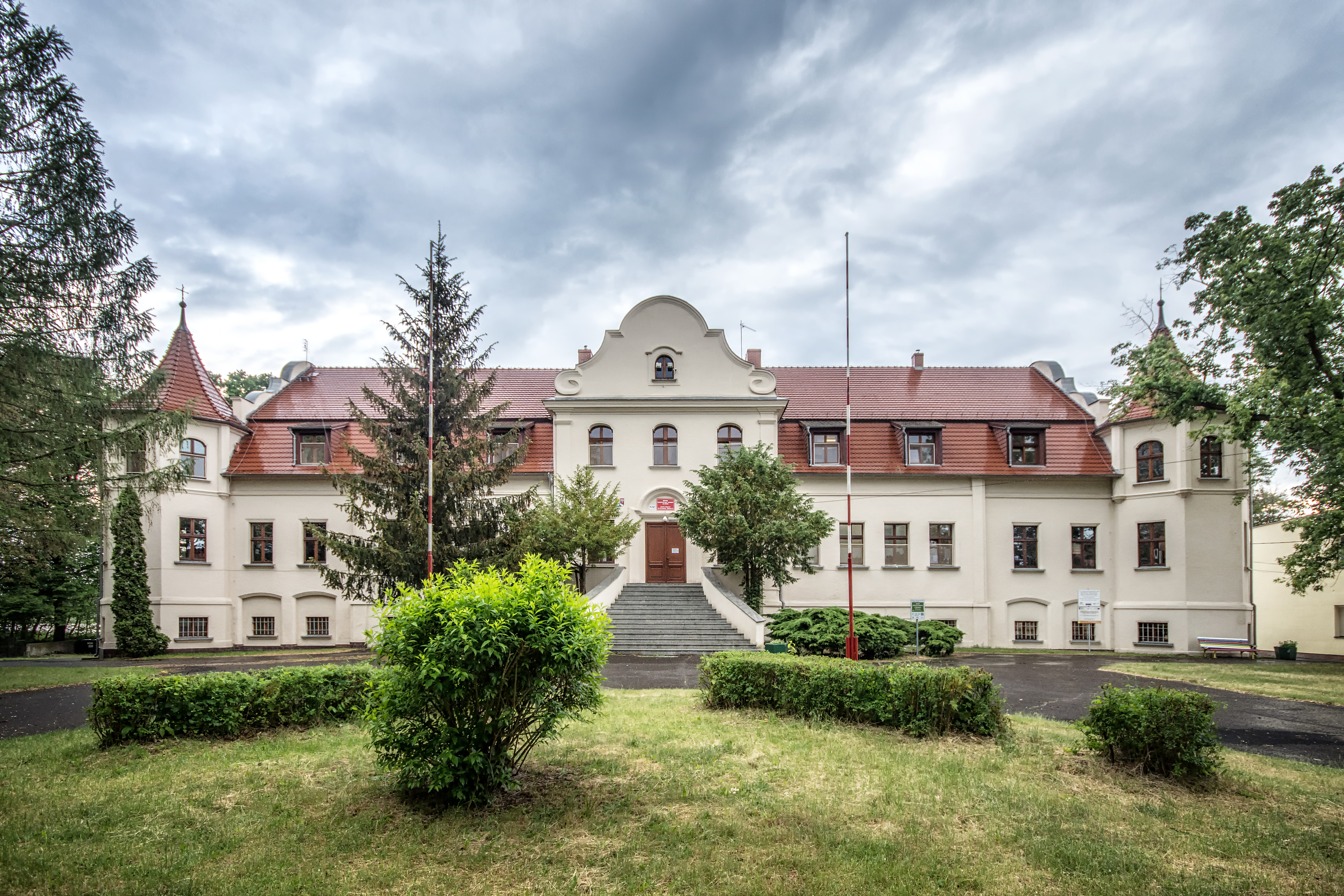
Reckenwalde castle, Brandenburg

On 4 March 1909, Bernhard entered into a morganatic marriage with Baroness Armgard von Sierstorpff-Cramm, widowed Countess von Oeynhausen. Before this marriage, his wife was granted the title Countess of Biesterfeld (Gräfin von Biesterfeld) on 8 February 1909. She and her two sons Bernhard and Aschwin were created Princess (Prince) of Lippe-Biesterfeld (Prinzessin (Prinz) zur Lippe-Biesterfeld) on 24 February 1916 with the style Serene Highness, which brought their children into a more senior place in the line of succession, in which they hitherto had been the very last. The suffix Biesterfeld was revived to mark the beginning of a new cadet line. They had two sons:

- Prince Bernhard of Lippe-Biesterfeld (29 June 1911 – 1 December 2004), married in 1937 to Juliana of the Netherlands, had issue.
- Prince Aschwin of Lippe-Biesterfeld (13 June 1914 – 14 May 1988), married in 1951 to Simone Arnoux, no issue.

Bernhard died in Munich, aged 61.

== Ancestry ==
8. Ernst, Count of Lippe-Biesterfeld
4. Julius, Count of Lippe-Biesterfeld
9. Modeste Christiane von Unruh
2. Ernest, Count of Lippe-Biesterfeld
10. Friedrich, Count of Castell-Castell
5. Countess Adelheid of Castell-Castell
11. Princess Emilie of Hohenlohe-Langenburg
1. Prince Bernhard of Lippe
12. Count Cäsar Alexander of Wartensleben
6. Count Leopold Otto of Wartensleben
13. Friederike von Gfug, Heiress of Osniszczewo
3. Countess Karoline of Wartensleben
14. Arnold Halbach
7. Mathilde Halbach
15. Johanna Caroline Mathilda Bohlen
