= Leopold III of Austria =

Leopold III of Austria may refer to:

- Leopold III, Margrave of Austria, the Saint (1050–1136), Margrave of Austria from the house of Babenberg
- Leopold III, Duke of Austria, (1351–1386), Duke of Styria, Carinthia, Tyrol, and Vorderösterreich of House of Habsburg, died in Battle of Sempach

== See also ==
- Leopold III (disambiguation)
- List of rulers of Austria
- Habsburg
