= Leopold I of Austria =

Leopold I of Austria may refer to:

- Leopold I of Austria (Babenberg), (d. 994), Margrave of Austria of the house of Babenberg
- Leopold I of Austria (Habsburg), (1290–1326), Duke of Austria of the house of Habsburg
- Leopold I, Holy Roman Emperor, (1640–1705), ruler of the Habsburg Empire

== See also ==
- Leopold I (disambiguation)
- List of rulers of Austria
- Habsburg
