= Leopold IV of Austria =

Leopold IV of Austria may refer to:

- Leopold IV, Duke of Bavaria (ca. 1108-1141), Margrave of Austria from 1137 and Duke of Bavaria from 1139
- Leopold IV, Duke of Austria (1371-1411), Habsburg Duke of the Leopoldinian Line, ruled from 1386

== See also ==
- Leopold IV (disambiguation)
- List of rulers of Austria
