= Leopold of Austria =

Leopold of Austria may refer to:

- Leopold I, Margrave of Austria (died 994), reigned 976–94
- Leopold II, Margrave of Austria (1050–1095), reigned 1075–95
- Leopold III, Margrave of Austria (1073–1136), reigned 1095–1136, saint
- Leopold V, Duke of Austria (1157–1194)
- Leopold I, Duke of Austria (1290–1326), co-ruler of Austria from 1308 to 1326
- Leopold II, Duke of Austria (1328–1344), nominal co-ruler of Austria, died 1344
- Leopold III, Duke of Austria (1351–1386), reigned 1365–86
- Leopold of Austria (Bishop) (died 1557), Bishop of Córdoba
- Leopold V, Archduke of Austria (1586–1632), Regent of the Tyrol and Further Austria
- Archduke Leopold Salvator of Austria (1863–1931), son of Archduke Karl Salvator of Austria
- Archduke Leopold of Austria, Prince of Tuscany (1897–1958), second son of Archduke Leopold Salvator

== See also ==
- Duke Leopold (disambiguation)
