= Prince Friedrich of Saxe-Meiningen =

German prince (1861–1914)

Prince Friedrich
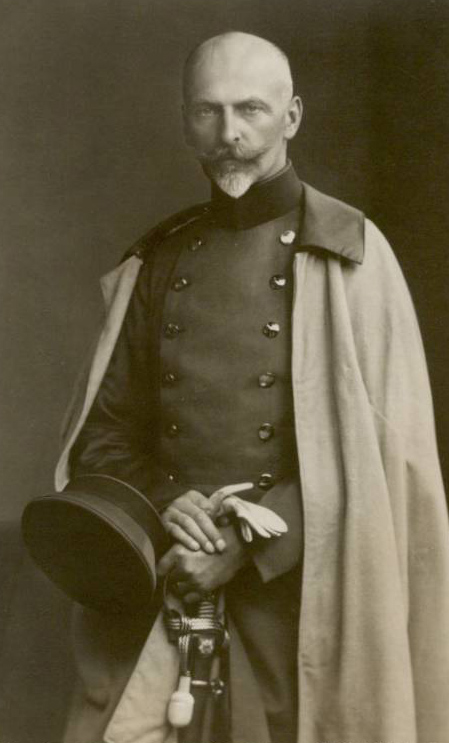
- Photograph by Albert Meyer, 1914
- Born: 12 October 1861; Meiningen, Duchy of Saxe-Meiningen, German Confederation
- Died: 23 August 1914 (aged 52); Tarcienne, Walcourt, Belgium
- Spouse: Adelaide of Lippe-Biesterfeld (m. 1889)
- Issue: Feodora, Grand Duchess of Saxe-Weimar-Eisenach; Adelaide, Princess Adalbert of Prussia; Georg, Prince of Saxe-Meiningen; Prince Ernst Leopold; Princess Luise Marie; Bernhard, Prince of Saxe-Meiningen
Names
- Friedrich Johann Bernhard Hermann Heinrich Moritz
- House: Saxe-Meiningen
- Father: Georg II, Duke of Saxe-Meiningen
- Mother: Princess Feodora of Hohenlohe-Langenburg

Prince Friedrich of Saxe-Meiningen, Duke of Saxony (Friedrich Johann Bernhard Hermann Heinrich Moritz; 12 October 1861 – 23 August 1914) was a German soldier and member of the Ducal House of Saxe-Meiningen.

== Birth and university ==
Prince Friedrich was born in Meiningen the second son of Georg II, Duke of Saxe-Meiningen and his second wife Princess Feodora of Hohenlohe-Langenburg, a descendant of Diego Velázquez.

Prince Friedrich attended the University of Bonn where unusually for a royal prince he refused to accept an adjutant or maintain a horse and carriage. At university due to his royal status he was a member of the exclusive "Borussia" student dueling corps. Although the future William II, German Emperor was a prominent member, Prince Friedrich was not active in the group, rarely attending meetings, instead preferring to shun social life in favour of concentrating on his studies. He narrowly escaped serious injury at Bonn when a retort blew up near him during a chemical experiment.

== Army and death ==
After finishing his studies Prince Friedrich entered into the army. Just as he had at university while a lieutenant in Strassbourg he was not an active member of society focusing on the study of artillery. He was promoted to colonel in 1902, brigadier general in 1907 and major general in 1910 before retiring from the army in 1913.

With the outbreak of the First World War in 1914, Prince Friedrich, despite suffering a broken arm a short while beforehand, returned to active service. He took the command of the 39th Reserve Infantry Brigade, part of the X Reserve Corps. The corps participated in the German invasion of Belgium. Prince Friedrich was killed on 23 August. His son Prince Georg, travelled to meet his father's regiment to discover his father's fate. He discovered his father had been struck by shrapnel or machine gun bullets when he left a house he was using as an observation post. One of his sons, Ernst Leopold was killed three days later.

His body was brought to the College of the Sacred Heart of Charleroi where he was embalmed. His body was returned to Meiningen for burial.

The American sculptor and Rome resident Moses Ezekiel created a bust of him.

== Marriage and issue ==
Prince Friedrich married Countess Adelaide of Lippe-Biesterfeld (later Princess of Lippe), daughter of Count Ernst of Lippe-Biesterfeld, in Neudorf on 24 April 1889. The dynastic status of the marriage of Friedrich and Adelaide was questioned during the Lippe succession dispute when it was argued that if Adelaide's brother, Leopold, was excluded from the Lippe succession on the grounds that their great-grandmother, Modeste von Unruh, was not of equal birth, then the children of Friedrich and Adelaide should be excluded from the Saxe-Meiningen succession on the same grounds.

Prince Friedrich and Princess Adelaide had six children who were full members of the Ducal House of Saxe-Meiningen:

- Princess Feodora of Saxe-Meiningen (29 May 1890–12 March 1972) she married Wilhelm Ernst, Grand Duke of Saxe-Weimar-Eisenach on 21 January 1910. They had four children.
- Princess Adelheid of Saxe-Meiningen (16 August 1891–25 April 1971) she married Prince Adalbert of Prussia on 3 August 1914. They had three children.
- Georg, Prince of Saxe-Meiningen (11 October 1892 – 6 January 1946) he married Countess Klara-Maria von Korff genannt Schmising-Kerssenbrock on 22 February 1919. They had four children.
- Prince Ernst of Saxe-Meiningen (23 September 1895-17 August 1914) at the age of eighteen he was killed in World War I.
- Princess Luise of Saxe-Meiningen (13 March 1899-14 February 1985) she married Götz Baron von Wangenheim on 25 October 1936. They had two children and three grandchildren:
  - Baroness Karin von Wangenheim (29 October 1937) she married Hans-Dieter Schwarze on 5 August 1963. They had one son.
  - Baron Ernst Friedrich von Wangenheim (14 April 1941) he married Christa Margarete Binninger on 4 July 1963. They had two children.
- Bernhard, Prince of Saxe-Meiningen (30 June 1901–4 October 1984) he married Margot Grössler on 25 April 1931. They had two children, three grandchildren and one great-grandson. He remarried Baroness Vera Schäffer von Bernstein on 11 August 1948. They had three children.

== Honours ==
He received the following orders and decorations:

- (Saxe-Coburg and Gotha) (Duchy of Saxe-Altenburg) (Saxe-Meiningen) Ernestine duchies: Grand Cross of the Saxe-Ernestine House Order, 1879
- Saxe-Weimar-Eisenach: Grand Cross of the White Falcon, 1885
- Brunswick: Grand Cross of Henry the Lion, 1895
- Austria-Hungary: Grand Cross of the Imperial Order of Leopold, 1895
- Baden:
  - Grand Cross of the Zähringer Lion, 1903
  - Knight of the House Order of Fidelity, 1908
- Kingdom of Prussia:
  - Knight of the Red Eagle, 1st Class
  - Service Award Cross
- Kingdom of Saxony: Knight of the Rue Crown
- Russian Empire: Knight of St. Alexander Nevsky

== Ancestry ==
Ancestors of Prince Friedrich of Saxe-Meiningen

8. Georg I, Duke of Saxe-Meiningen
4. Bernhard II, Duke of Saxe-Meiningen
9. Princess Luise Eleonore of Hohenlohe-Langenburg
2. Georg II, Duke of Saxe-Meiningen
10. William II, Elector of Hesse
5. Princess Marie Frederica of Hesse-Kassel
11. Princess Augusta of Prussia
1. Prince Friedrich of Saxe-Meiningen
12. Charles Louis, Prince of Hohenlohe-Langenburg
6. Ernst I, Prince of Hohenlohe-Langenburg
13. Countess Amalie Henriette of Solms-Baruth
3. Princess Feodora of Hohenlohe-Langenburg
14. Emich Carl, 2nd Prince of Leiningen
7. Princess Feodora of Leiningen
15. Princess Victoria of Saxe-Coburg-Saalfeld

== Bibliography ==
- Lemaire, A. (1929). L'invasion allemande au pays de Charleroi. Brussels: Janssens, Leunis et Havet. p. 325.
