= Ernst, Prince of Saxe-Meiningen =

Ernst
- Prince of Saxe-Meiningen
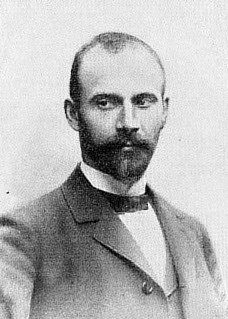

Head of the House of Saxe-Meiningen
- Tenure: 16 January 1928 – 29 December 1941
- Predecessor: Bernhard III
- Successor: Prince Georg
- Born: 27 September 1859; Meiningen
- Died: 29 December 1941 (aged 82); Altenstein
- Spouse: Katharina Jensen (m. 1892)
- Issue: Baron Georg Wilhelm; Baroness Elisabeth Helene; Baron Ernst Frederick; Baron Ralf Erich; Baron Sven Hans; Baron Heinrich
Names
- Ernst Bernhard Victor Georg
- House: Saxe-Meiningen
- Father: Georg II, Duke of Saxe-Meiningen
- Mother: Feodora of Hohenlohe-Langenburg

Ernst, Prince of Saxe-Meiningen (Ernst, Prinz von Sachsen-Meiningen; 27 September 1859 – 29 December 1941) was the head of the house of Saxe-Meiningen from 1928 until his death.

== Biography ==
He was born in Meiningen, the eldest son of the heir apparent to the duchy of Saxe-Meiningen, Prince Georg and his second wife, HSH Princess Feodora of Hohenlohe-Langenburg. His father succeeded to the throne in 1866. Ernst pursued a career in the army and retired as colonel in the Prussian cavalry. He received an honorary doctorate in philosophy from the University of Jena.

Ernst was married, morganatically, in Munich on 20 September 1892, to Katharina Jensen, daughter of the painter Marie and the poet Wilhelm Jensen. Not permitted to share her husband's dynastic title, his wife was created Baroness von Saalfeld on their wedding day by Ernst's father, Georg II. Despite his unequal marriage, Ernst retained his succession rights to the duchy of Saxe-Meiningen.

When his older half-brother, the last reigning duke of Saxe-Meiningen, Bernhard III, died on 16 January 1928, Ernst succeeded him as head of the ducal house, but never reigned, since the monarchy was abolished at the end of World War I in 1918. Rather than his own son, Ernst's nephew Georg, Prince of Saxe-Meiningen, succeeded him as head of the house following his death at Schloss Altenstein.

== Children ==
Ernst and Katharina had six children:

- Baron Georg Wilhelm von Saalfeld (11 June 1893 – 29 April 1916) killed in action at the age of twenty-two.
- Baroness Elisabeth Helen Adelheid Marie von Saalfeld (2 February 1895 – 4 June 1934) she married Dr. Johann Duken on 25 April 1917.
- Baron Ernst Friedrich Heinrich Paul von Saalfeld (4 July 1896 – 28 May 1915) killed in action at the age of eighteen.
- Baron Ralf Erich von Saalfeld (28 March 1900 – 22 July 1947) he married Marie Seitz (1903 – 1931) on 11 October 1925. They had two children. He remarried Melanie von Bismarck on 16 August 1936. They had four children.
- Baron Sven Hans Heinrich Bernhard von Saalfeld (18 September 1903 – 13 December 1998) he married Elisabeth Faust on 20 March 1936 and they were divorced on 6 November 1952. They had five children.
- Baron Enzio Heinrich Waldemar Carl von Saalfeld (7 July 1908 – 31 March 1941) he married Rut Viererbe on 28 February 1936. They had four children.

== Ancestry ==
Ancestors of Ernst, Prince of Saxe-Meiningen

8. Georg I, Duke of Saxe-Meiningen
4. Bernhard II, Duke of Saxe-Meiningen
9. Princess Luise Eleonore of Hohenlohe-Langenburg
2. Georg II, Duke of Saxe-Meiningen
10. William II, Elector of Hesse
5. Princess Marie Frederica of Hesse-Kassel
11. Princess Augusta of Prussia
1. Prince Ernst of Saxe-Meiningen
12. Charles Louis, Prince of Hohenlohe-Langenburg
6. Ernst I, Prince of Hohenlohe-Langenburg
13. Countess Amalie Henriette of Solms-Baruth
3. Princess Feodora of Hohenlohe-Langenburg
14. Emich Carl, 2nd Prince of Leiningen
7. Princess Feodora of Leiningen
15. Princess Victoria of Saxe-Coburg-Saalfeld

Ernst, Prince of Saxe-Meiningen House of Saxe-Meiningen Cadet branch of the House of Wettin Born: 27 September 1859 Died: 29 December 1941
Titles in pretence
Preceded by Bernhard III	— TITULAR — Duke of Saxe-Meiningen; 16 January 1928 – 29 December 1941; Reason for succession failure: Duchy abolished in 1918	Succeeded by Georg
