= Leopold of Habsburg =

Leopold of Habsburg may refer to:

- Leopold I, Duke of Austria (1290-1326)
- Leopold III, Duke of Austria
- Leopold IV, Duke of Austria (1371-1411)
- Archduke Leopold Wilhelm of Austria (1614-1662)
- Leopold I, Holy Roman Emperor (1640-1705)
- Leopold V, Archduke of Austria (1586-1632)
- Leopold II, Holy Roman Emperor (1747-1792)
