= Leopold IV =

Leopold IV may refer to:

- Leopold IV, Duke of Anhalt (1794–1871)
- Leopold IV, Duke of Austria (1371–1411)
- Leopold IV, Duke of Bavaria (c. 1108–1141)
- Leopold IV, Prince of Lippe (1871–1949)
