= Leopold IV of Lippe =

Prince of Lippe from 1905 to 1918

Leopold IV
- Leopold IV in 1915

Prince of Lippe
- Reign: 25 October 1905 – 12 November 1918
- Predecessor: Alexander
- Successor: Monarchy abolished
- Born: 30 May 1871; Oberkassel, German Empire
- Died: 30 December 1949 (aged 78); Detmold, West Germany
- Spouse: Princess Bertha of Hesse-Philippsthal-Barchfeld (m. 1901; died 1919) Princess Anna of Ysenburg and Büdingen (m. 1922)
- Issue: Ernst, Hereditary Prince of Lippe; Prince Leopold Bernhard of Lippe; Princess Karoline of Lippe; Prince Chlodwig of Lippe; Princess Sieglinde of Lippe; Armin, Prince of Lippe
- House: House of Lippe
- Father: Ernest, Count of Lippe-Biesterfeld
- Mother: Countess Karoline of Wartensleben

Leopold IV, Prince of Lippe (Leopold Julius Bernhard Adalbert Otto Karl Gustav; 30 May 1871 – 30 December 1949) was the final sovereign of the Principality of Lippe in northwestern Germany from 1905 until his abdication in 1918. Prior to succeeding to the throne, he had been governing the state since 1904 as regent. He was the first and only ruler of Lippe of the Lippe-Biesterfeld branch.

== Early life ==
He was born as Count Leopold of Lippe-Biesterfeld in Oberkassel, the son of Ernest, Count of Lippe-Biesterfeld and Countess Karoline of Wartensleben. Leopold belonged to the Lippe-Biesterfeld line of the House of Lippe which was the most senior line of the princely house after the reigning Lippe-Detmold line.

After obtaining the Abitur in 1891, he served as an officer in the German Army until 1894, when he left to study political science at the universities of Bonn and Berlin.

== Ruler of Lippe ==
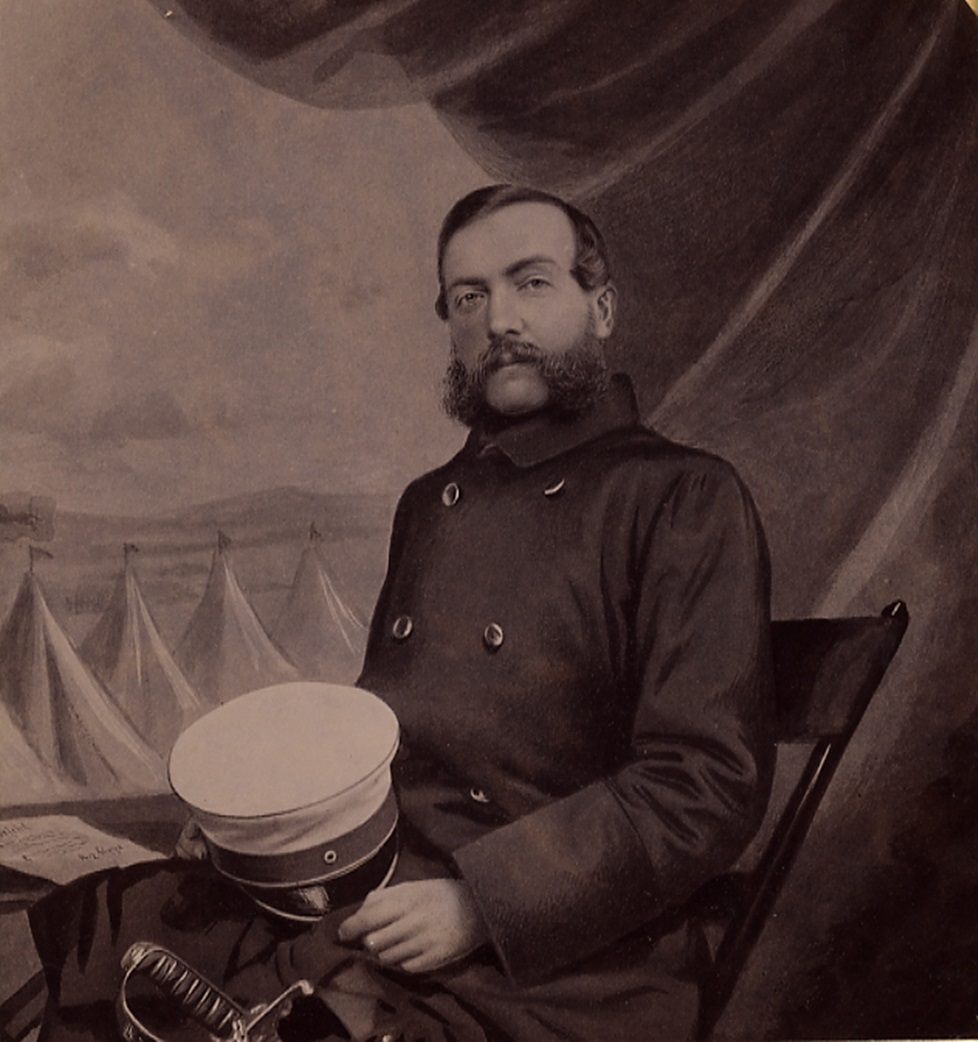
The incapacitated Prince Alexander.

Since 1895, the Principality of Lippe had been ruled by a regent due to the incapacity of Prince Alexander. Leopold's father had acted as regent since 1897, and following his death on 26 September 1904, Leopold assumed the regency. This was not recognized by the German Emperor Wilhelm II, who initially refused to legally recognize Leopold as regent as there was an issue over whether Leopold and his siblings were of legitimate rank, and as such eligible for the succession. As a result, the Diet of Lippe appointed a high commission to consider the matter.

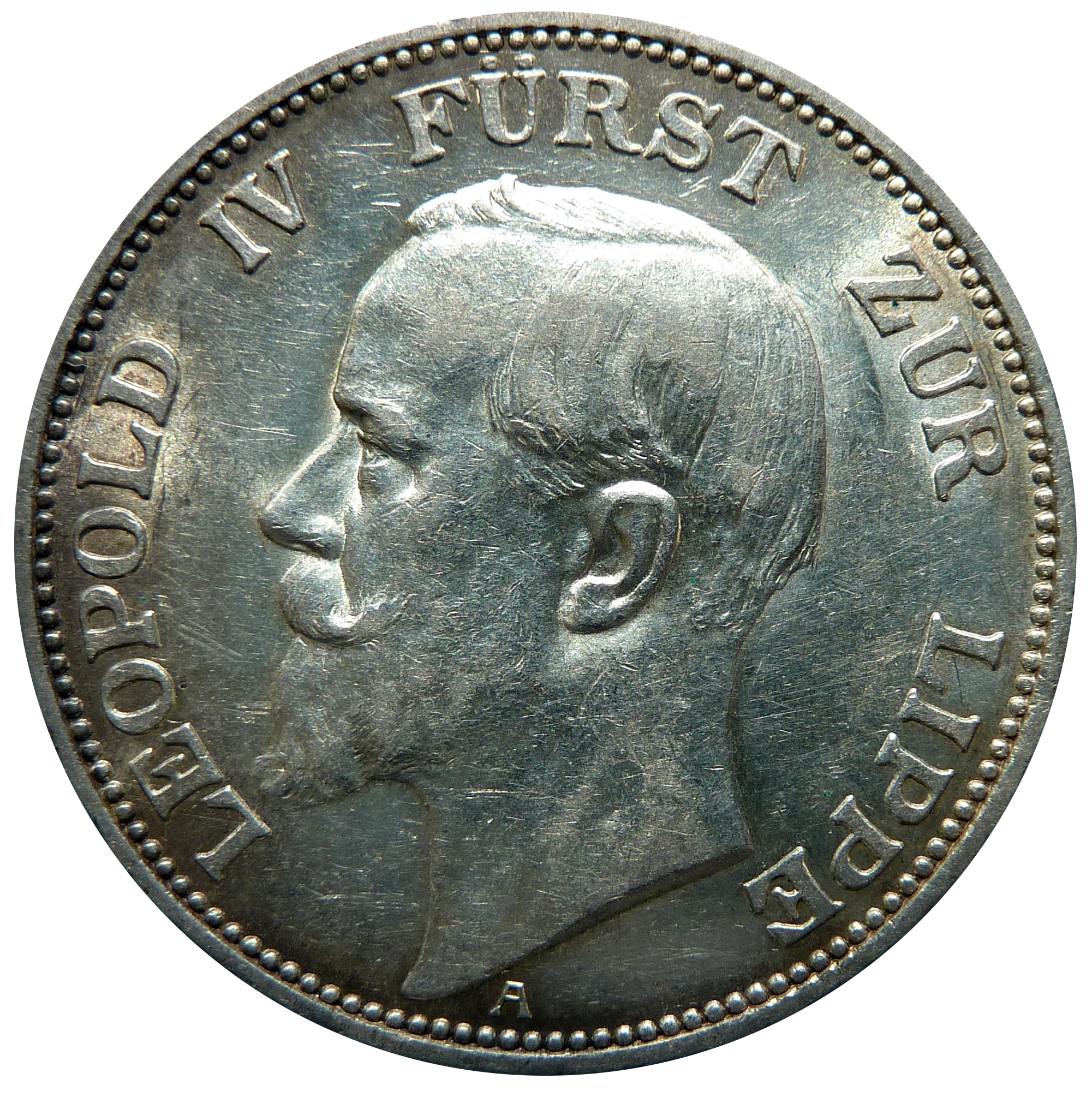
3-Mark-Coin of the Principality of Lippe with a portrait of Prince Leopold IV.

The regency issue was still ongoing when Prince Alexander died on 13 January 1905. Leopold was confirmed as Prince of Lippe and Alexander's successor on 25 October 1905, following a court ruling.

On 3 June 1911, while out motoring, Leopold and his brother Prince Julius were attacked by a gang of Italian laborers who hurled a shower of missiles at the princes. Though Leopold escaped unhurt, his brother received a head wound.

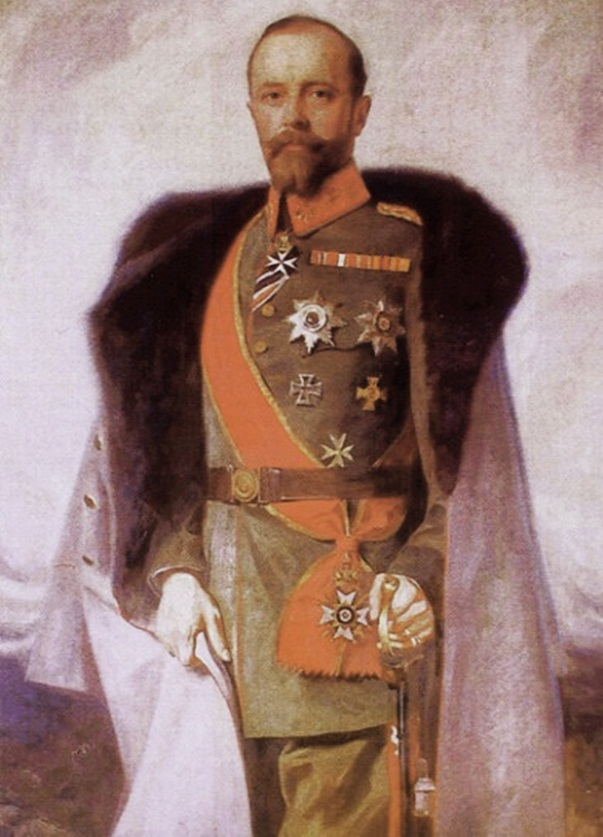
Prince Leopold IV, probably during World War I.

During World War I, Leopold upgraded the titles of the various lines of the House of Lippe. One of the members to benefit from the granting of titles was Leopold's nephew Count Bernhard of Biesterfeld (son of Leopold's brother Bernhard), who would go on to become the Prince Consort of Queen Juliana of the Netherlands. On 24 February 1916, Bernhard and his brother were upgraded to the title Prince of Lippe-Biesterfeld with the style Serene Highness. The Counts of Lippe-Weissenfeld also benefited with creations of the title Prince of Lippe-Weissenfeld, with the style Serene Highness, taking place on 24 February 1916 for Count Clemens and his descendants, and again on 9 November 1918 for the other members of this line.

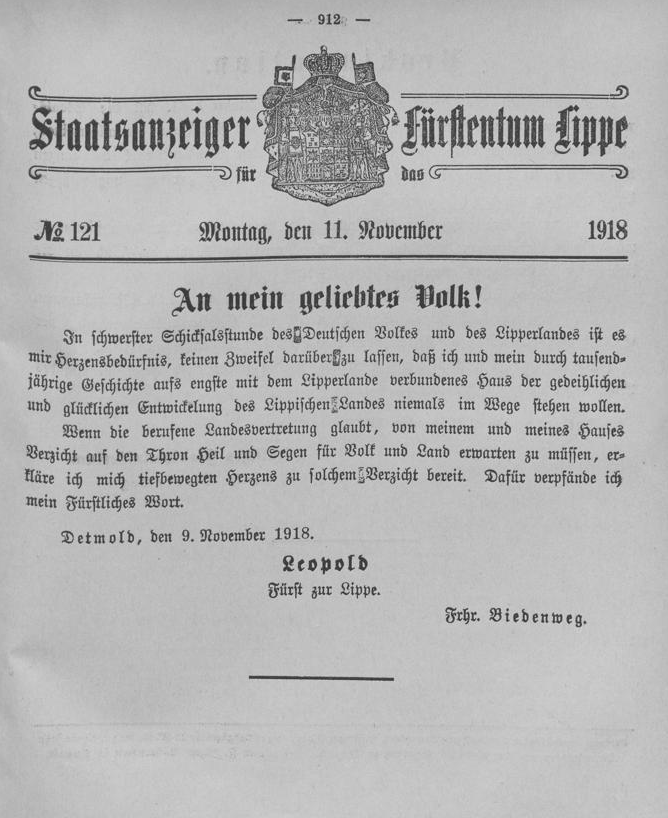
Prince Leopold's abdication announcement.

Just three days after upgrading the titles of members of the Lippe-Weissenfeld line, and following the German Empire's defeat in World War I and the subsequent revolution, Leopold was forced to renounce the throne on 12 November 1918. Following the end of his rule, the Principality of Lippe was transformed into a Free state in the new Weimar Republic.

== Post abdication ==
After the rise of Nazism in Germany all three of his sons by his first wife became members of the party. His eldest son the Hereditary Prince Ernst is reported to have been the first German prince to join the party when he signed up in May 1928.

In addition to being pro Nazi, both Hereditary Prince Ernst and Prince Chlodwig had contracted unequal marriages. So in 1947 when Leopold wrote his will, Armin, his youngest son and only child with his second wife, would succeed him as head of the House of Lippe and also become administrator of the princely family's properties such as Schloss Detmold. Thus when Leopold died in Detmold his three eldest sons were all disinherited and his youngest son Armin became head of the princely house.

== Marriages and children ==
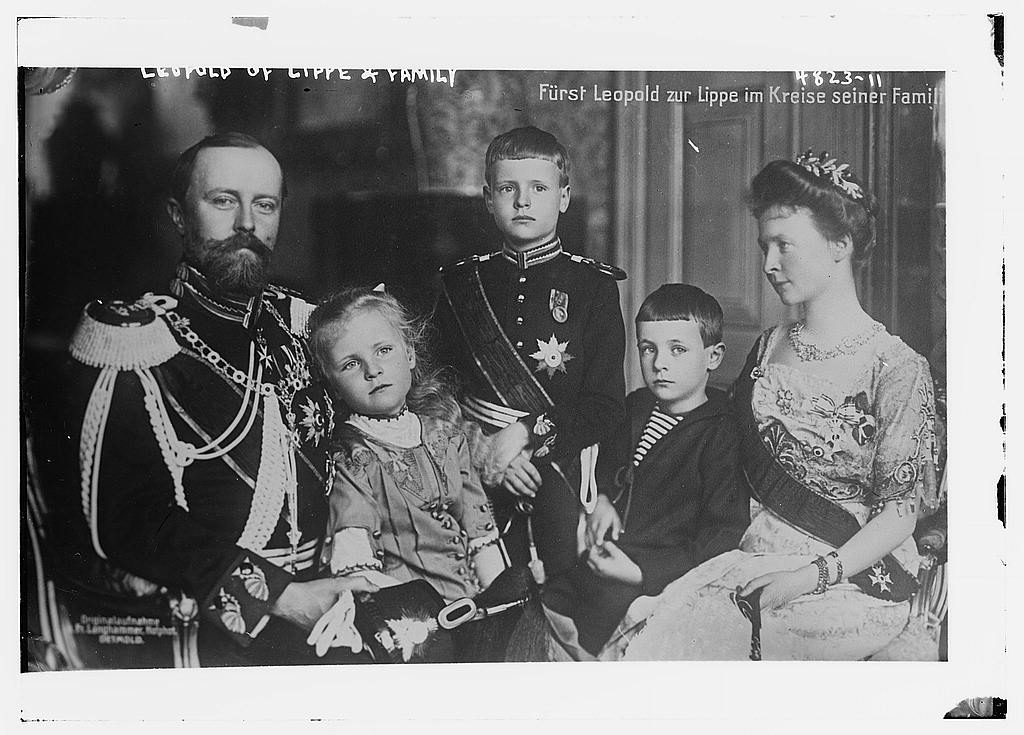
Prince Leopold and Princess Bertha with their three eldest children in 1910.

Leopold was married to Princess Bertha of Hesse-Philippsthal-Barchfeld (1874–1919) on 16 August 1901 in Rotenburg. They had five children.

- Ernst, Hereditary Prince of Lippe (1902–1987) married first (1924) Charlotte Ricken (1900–1974). After divorcing in 1934 he married secondly (1937) Herta-Elise Weiland (1911–1970)
- Prince Leopold Bernhard of Lippe (1904–1965)
- Princess Karoline of Lippe (1905–2001) married (1932) Count Hans von Kanitz (1893–1968)
- Prince Chlodwig of Lippe (1909–2000) married (1940) Veronika Holl (1915–2007)
- Princess Sieglinde of Lippe (1915–2008) married (1942) Friedrich Carl Heldman (1904–1977)

He was married secondly to Princess Anna of Ysenburg and Büdingen (1886–1980) on 26 April 1922 at Büdingen. From this marriage he had one son.

- Armin, Prince of Lippe (1924–2015) married Traute Becker in 1953. Their only son is:
  - Stephan, Prince of Lippe, born 1959, married Countess Maria of Solms-Laubach in 1994

== Ancestry ==
Ancestors of Leopold IV of Lippe

16. Karl, Count of Lippe-Biesterfeld
8. Ernst I, Count of Lippe-Biesterfeld
17. Countess Ferdinande of Bentheim-Tecklenburg-Rheda
4. Julius, Count of Lippe-Biesterfeld
18. Karl Philipp von Unruh
9. Modeste von Unruh
19. Elisabeth Henriette Dorothea von Kameke
2. Ernest II, Count of Lippe-Biesterfeld
20. Count Friedrich Carl of Castell-Castell
10. Friedrich, Count of Castell-Castell
21. Countess Amalie of Löwenstein-Wertheim-Virneburg
5. Countess Adelheid of Castell-Castell
22. Charles Louis, Prince of Hohenlohe-Langenburg
11. Princess Emilie of Hohenlohe-Langenburg
23. Countess Amalie Henriette of Solms-Baruth
1. Leopold IV, Prince of Lippe
24. Count Leopold of Wartensleben
12. Count Cäsar of Wartensleben
25. Caroline Louise Dorothea von der Recke
6. Count Leopold of Wartensleben
26. Carl Georg Friedrich von Gfug
13. Friederike von Gfug, Heiress of Osniszczewo
27. Johanna Juliane von Lestwitz
3. Countess Karoline of Wartensleben
28. Johannes Arnold Halbach
14. Arnold Halbach
29. Maria Gertrud Hilger
7. Mathilde Halbach
30. Bohl Bohlen
15. Caroline Bohlen
31. Johanna Magdalene Oswald

Leopold IV of Lippe House of Lippe Born: 30 May 1871 Died: 30 December 1949
Regnal titles
Preceded by Count Ernest	Regent of Lippe; 26 September 1904 – 25 October 1905	End of Regency became Prince
Preceded by Prince Alexander	Prince of Lippe; 25 October 1905 – 12 November 1918	Monarchy abolished German Revolution
Titles in pretence
Loss of title Republic declared	— TITULAR — Prince of Lippe; 12 November 1918 – 30 December 1949	Succeeded by Prince Armin
