= Bernhard III of Saxe-Meiningen =

Duke of Saxe-Meiningen from 1914 to 1918

Bernhard III
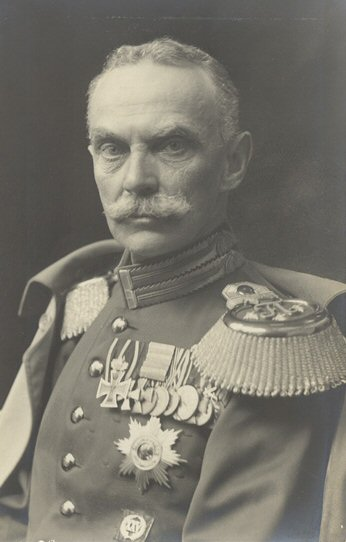
- Bernhard III, c. 1914–1918

Duke of Saxe-Meiningen
- Reign: 25 June 1914 – 10 November 1918
- Predecessor: George II
- Successor: Monarchy abolished

Head of the House of Saxe-Meiningen
- Tenure: 1918–1928
- Predecessor: George II
- Successor: Prince Ernst
- Born: 1 April 1851; Meiningen, Saxe-Meiningen
- Died: 16 January 1928 (aged 76); Meiningen, Weimar Republic
- Burial: 22 January 1928; Schloss Altenstein, Germany
- Spouse: Princess Charlotte of Prussia (m. 1878; died 1919)
- Issue: Feodora, Princess Heinrich XXX Reuss of Köstritz
Names
- German: Bernhard Friedrich Wilhelm Albrecht Georg; English: Bernhard Frederick William Albert George
- House: Saxe-Meiningen
- Father: George II, Duke of Saxe-Meiningen
- Mother: Princess Charlotte of Prussia

Bernhard III (German: Bernhard Friedrich Wilhelm Albrecht Georg; 1 April 1851 – 16 January 1928), was the last reigning duke of Saxe-Meiningen from 1914 to 1918.

== Biography ==
Bernhard was born on 1 April 1851 at Meiningen in what was then the German Confederation, as the eldest son of Georg II, Duke of Saxe-Meiningen and his first wife Princess Charlotte of Prussia. He had one full sister, Princess Marie Elisabeth, and several half-brothers by his father's second marriage.

From 1860 Bernhard was schooled by a Prof. Rossmann before he went to study at Heidelberg University in 1869. For the war against France he interrupted his studies and served as Ordonnanz-Offizier. After the war ended he resumed his studies at Leipzig. From 1873 he again served in the military and rose into the highest echelons: By 1905 he was Generaloberst and inspector general of the 2nd Army Inspection (Central Germany). In 1909, he became Generaloberst im Range eines Generalfeldmarschalls and retired from active service in 1912.

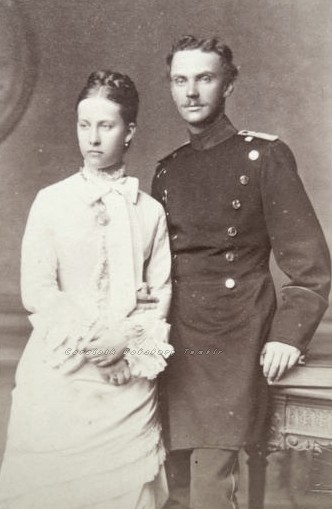
Bernhard of Saxe-Meiningen with Charlotte of Prussia around the time of their engagement, 1876

He married in Berlin on 18 February 1878 Princess Charlotte of Prussia, his second cousin, daughter of Frederick III, German Emperor and granddaughter of the Queen Victoria. They had one daughter: Princess Feodora of Saxe-Meiningen (b. Potsdam, 12 May 1879 - d. Schloß Neuhoff, 26 August 1945), married on 24 September 1898 to Heinrich XXX of Reuss-Köstritz.

His wife's cousin and critic, Queen Marie of Romania, described him in her memoir:

Her husband, Bernard Erbprinz of Saxe-Meiningen, came with her; she never liked him, but for all that he was devoted to her and he imagined she was the most perfect of wives, which shows how clever she was. Both passionate soldiers, Uncle and he would discuss military questions by the hour, but the King preferred still more talking politics with irresistible Charly.

=== Reign ===
Bernhard assumed the Duchy of Saxe-Meiningen after the death of his father in 1914. With the start of World War I Bernhard hoped to be assigned command over an army but was disappointed. In reaction he also withdrew from his role in the Duchy's government.

After Germany lost the war, the German revolution forced Bernhard to abdicate as duke on 10 November 1918. Like all the German princes he lost his title and state. He spent the rest of his life in his former country as a private citizen.

Bernhard died on 16 January 1928 in Meiningen. He is buried next to his wife in the park at Altenstein.

== Interests ==
Despite his military career he also took a great interest in the arts. He was active as a composer, poet and translator. He was known in particular as an expert on Modern Greek and was renowned for translating German literature into Greek. For his historical studies, for which he repeatedly travelled to Greece and Asia Minor, the University of Breslau awarded him an honorary doctorate.

== Honours ==
- (Saxe-Coburg and Gotha) (Duchy of Saxe-Altenburg) (Saxe-Meiningen) Ernestine duchies: Grand Cross of the Saxe-Ernestine House Order, 1869; Joint Grand Master, 25 June 1914
- Kingdom of Prussia:
  - Iron Cross (1870), 2nd Class
  - Grand Commander's Cross of the Royal House Order of Hohenzollern, 2 April 1877
  - Knight of the Order of the Black Eagle, 23 April 1877; with Collar, 1878
- Saxe-Weimar-Eisenach: Grand Cross of the Order of the White Falcon, 1870
- Grand Duchy of Hesse: Grand Cross of the Grand Ducal Hessian Order of Ludwig, 18 February 1878
- Belgium: Grand Cordon of the Order of Leopold (military division), 25 February 1878
- Oldenburg: Grand Cross of the House and Merit Order of Duke Peter Friedrich Ludwig, with Crown in Gold, 18 February 1878
- Baden:
  - Knight of the House Order of Fidelity, 1881
  - Knight of the Order of Berthold the First, 1881
- Kingdom of Saxony: Knight of the Order of the Rue Crown, 1885
- (Austrian Empire) (Kingdom of Hungary) Austria-Hungary: Grand Cross of the Royal Hungarian Order of St. Stephen, 1887
- United Kingdom: Honorary Knight Grand Cross of the Most Honourable Order of the Bath (civil division), 21 June 1887
- Empire of Japan: Grand Cordon of the Supreme Order of the Chrysanthemum, 5 February 1896
- Russian Empire: Knight of the Imperial Order of St. Alexander Nevsky, 1896

Bernhard III of Saxe-Meiningen House of Saxe-Meiningen Cadet branch of the House of Wettin Born: 1 April 1851 Died: 16 January 1928
Regnal titles
Preceded by Georg II	Duke of Saxe-Meiningen; 25 June 1914 – 10 November 1918	Office abolished German Revolution
Titles in pretence
Loss of title Republic declared	— TITULAR — Duke of Saxe-Meiningen; 10 November 1918 – 16 January 1928	Succeeded by Prince Ernst
