= Leopold III =

Leopold III may refer to:

- Leopold III, Margrave of Austria (1073–1136), sixth Margrave of Austria
- Leopold III, Duke of Austria (1351–1386), co-Archduke of Austria and co-Duke of Styria
- Leopold III, Duke of Anhalt-Dessau (1740–1817), first Duke of Anhalt-Dessau
- Leopold III, Prince of Lippe (1821–1875)
- Leopold III of Belgium (1901–1983), fourth King of the Belgians
