= Leopold I =

Leopold I may refer to:

- Leopold I, Margrave of Austria (d. 994), first Margrave of Austria
- Leopold I, Duke of Austria (1290–1326), co-Duke of Austria and Styria with Frederick I
- Leopold I, Holy Roman Emperor (1640–1705), Holy Roman Emperor, King of Germany, Hungary and Bohemia
- Leopold I, Prince of Anhalt-Dessau (1676–1747), Prince of Anhalt-Dessau
- Leopold I, Prince of Lippe (1767–1802), ruler of the Principality of Lippe
- Leopold I, Grand Duke of Baden (1790–1852)
- Leopold I of Belgium (1790–1865), first King of the Belgians
