= Princess Feodora of Hohenlohe-Langenburg =

Feodora of Hohenlohe-Langenburg

Duchess consort of Saxe-Meiningen
- Tenure: 20 September 1866 – 10 February 1872
- Born: 7 July 1839; Stuttgart, Kingdom of Württemberg, German Confederation
- Died: 10 February 1872 (aged 32); Meiningen, Duchy of Saxe-Meiningen, German Empire
- Spouse: Georg II, Duke of Saxe-Meiningen (m. 1858)
- Issue: Ernst, Prince of Saxe-Meiningen; Prince Friedrich; Prince Viktor
Names
- German: Feodora Viktoria Adelheid; English: Feodora Victoria Adelaide
- House: Hohenlohe-Langenburg
- Father: Ernst I, Prince of Hohenlohe-Langenburg
- Mother: Princess Feodora of Leiningen

Princess Feodora Victoria Adelheid of Hohenlohe-Langenburg (7 July 1839 – 10 February 1872) was the daughter of Ernst I, Prince of Hohenlohe-Langenburg and Princess Feodora of Leiningen. She married Georg II, Duke of Saxe-Meiningen, and was the Duchess of Saxe-Meiningen from his accession as Duke Georg II on 20 September 1866 until her death in 1872.

== Life ==
Feodora was the youngest of six children. Her mother was the older half-sister to Queen Victoria, thus making the younger Feodora the niece of the Queen. Her siblings included Prince Victor of Hohenlohe-Langenburg and Adelheid, Duchess of Schleswig-Holstein.

== Duchess consort of Saxe-Meiningen ==
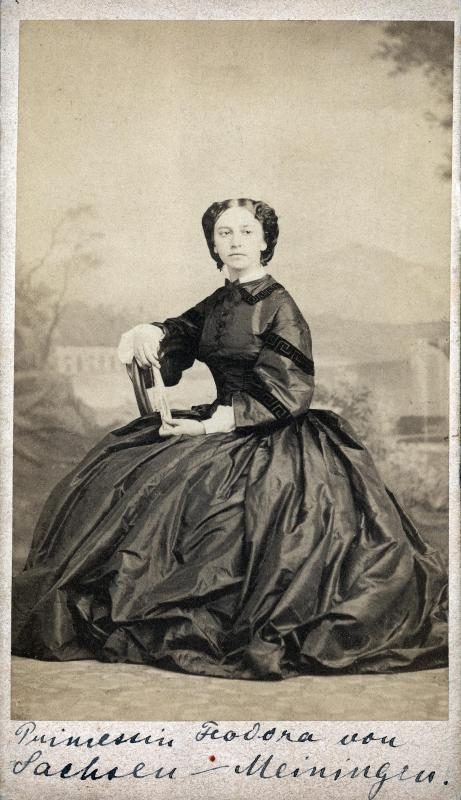
Princess Feodora c. 1865

Feodora met her future husband (and second cousin) while he was on his way to Italy. He had been recently widowed, his first wife having been Charlotte Frederica of Prussia. Despite this recent loss, Georg went on a search to provide a mother for his two young children. Feodora and Georg became engaged almost at once.

The couple then set out for Germany where they on 23 October 1858, they married at Langenburg. King William I of Württemberg and Queen Pauline Therese were present at their wedding. They had three sons.

Their marriage was unhappy, however, as Georg had never become reconciled to Charlotte's death and Feodora was not temperamentally suited for the life she was expected to lead. She had no intellectual or artistic attainments and no apparent interest in developing any. Despite this fact, Georg attempted to educate her. He was a great lover of the arts, especially theatre. Her mother approved, stating it was "very sensible of him indeed to arrange for his bride to be much occupied with lessons, to take drawing lessons, and to hear lectures on history". He soon realised however that she would never be as witty and clever as Charlotte. After the death of their third son, Feodora stayed away from Meiningen for as much time as decently possible. In 1866, he succeeded as Duke of Saxe-Meiningen, making her the first lady of the realm.

Feodora contracted scarlet fever in January 1872, and died the following month. Despite the many differences between them, Georg had remained fond of her; when she became sick, he was genuinely distraught and sent telegrams to her mother twice daily. In the following year, Georg remarried again, morganatically to Ellen Franz, a former actress.

== Children ==
- Prince Ernst Bernhard of Saxe-Meiningen (27 September 1859 – 29 December 1941) he married Katharina Jensen (created Baroness von Saalfeld) on 20 September 1892. They had six children.
- Prince Frederick Johann of Saxe-Meiningen (12 October 1861 – 23 August 1914) he married Countess Adelaide of Lippe-Biesterfeld on 24 April 1889. They had six children.
- Prince Viktor of Saxe-Meiningen (14 May 1865 – 17 May 1865) died three days old.

== Ancestry ==
Ancestors of Princess Feodora of Hohenlohe-Langenburg

8. Christian Albrecht, Prince of Hohenlohe-Langenburg
4. Carl Ludwig III, Prince of Hohenlohe-Langenburg
9. Princess Caroline of Stolberg-Gedern
2. Ernst I, Prince of Hohenlohe-Langenburg
10. Johann Christian II, Count of Solms-Baruth
5. Countess Amalie Henriette of Solms-Baruth
11. Countess Friederike Luise Reuss-Köstritz
1. Feodora of Hohenlohe-Langenburg
12. Carl, Prince of Leiningen
6. Emich Carl, Prince of Leiningen
13. Countess Christiane of Solms-Rödelheim und Assenheim
3. Princess Feodora of Leiningen
14. Francis, Duke of Saxe-Coburg-Saalfeld
7. Princess Victoria of Saxe-Coburg-Saalfeld
15. Countess Augusta Reuss-Ebersdorf

Princess Feodora of Hohenlohe-Langenburg House of Hohenlohe-Langenburg Born: 7 July 1839 Died: 10 February 1872
German royalty
Preceded by Marie Frederica of Hesse-Kassel	Duchess consort of Saxe-Meiningen; 20 September 1866 – 30 March 1872	Vacant Title next held by Charlotte of Prussia
