= Ernest, Count of Lippe-Biesterfeld =

Ernst
- Count of Lippe-Biesterfeld
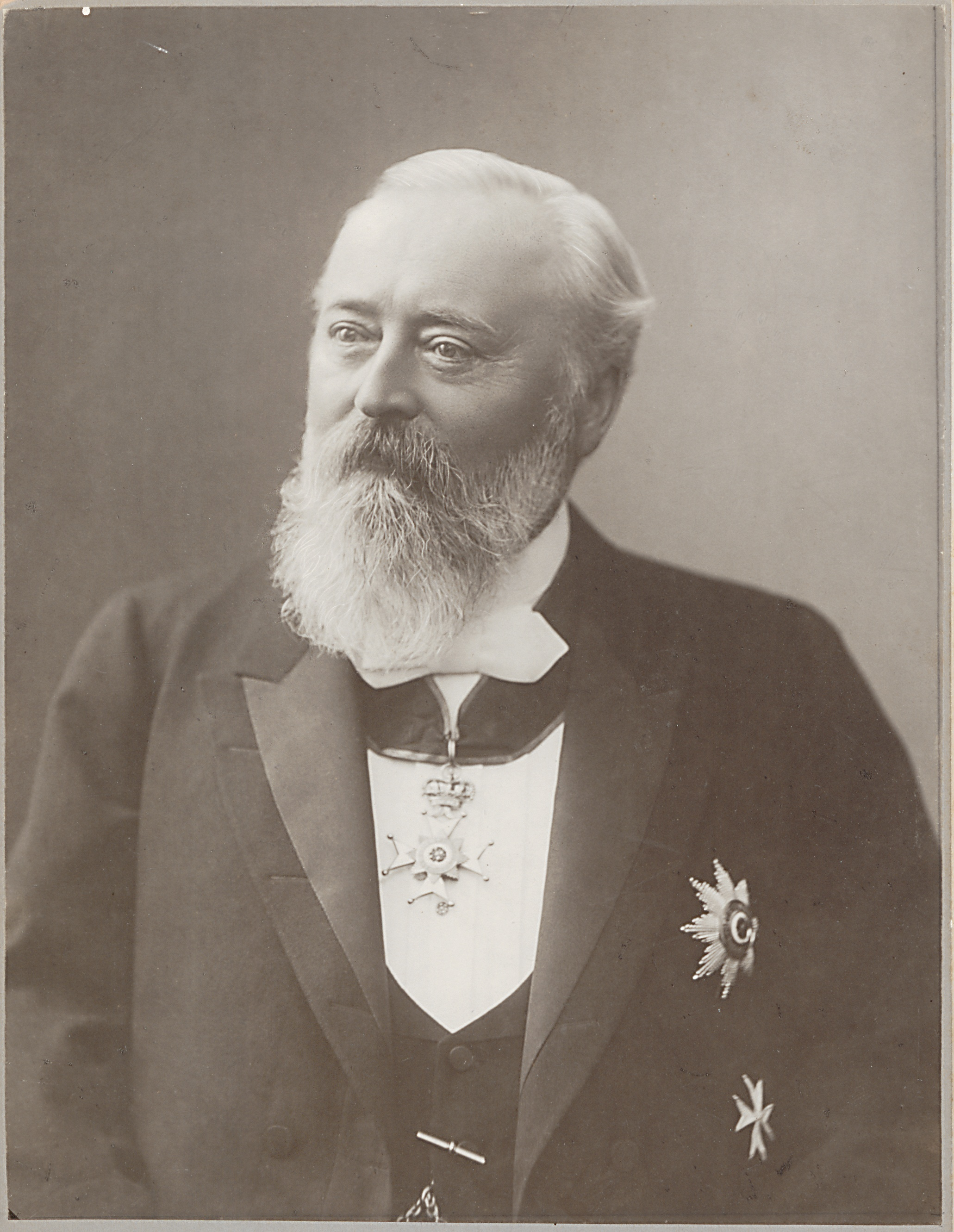

Regent of Lippe
- Reign: 17 July 1897 – 26 September 1904
- Predecessor: Prince Adolf of Schaumburg-Lippe
- Successor: Leopold, Count of Lippe-Biesterfeld
- Born: 9 June 1842; Oberkassel, Kingdom of Prussia
- Died: 26 September 1904 (aged 62); Schloss Lopshorn, Principality of Lippe
- Spouse: Countess Karoline von Wartensleben (m. 1869)
- Issue: Adelheid, Princess Frederick Johann of Saxe-Meiningen; Leopold IV, Prince of Lippe; Prince Bernhard; Prince Julius; Princess Karola; Princess Mathilde
Names
- Ernst Kasimir Friedrich Karl Eberhard
- House: Lippe
- Father: Julius, Count of Lippe-Biesterfeld
- Mother: Countess Adelheid of Castell-Castell

Ernst, Count of Lippe-Biesterfeld (Ernst Kasimir Friedrich Karl Eberhard; 9 June 1842 – 26 September 1904) was the head of the Lippe-Biesterfeld line of the House of Lippe. From 1897 until his death he was the regent of the Principality of Lippe.

== Early life and dispute ==
He was born in Oberkassel the third child of Julius, Count of Lippe-Biesterfeld (1812–1884) and his wife, Countess Adelheid of Castell-Castell (1818–1900). On 17 May 1884 Count Ernst succeeded his father as the head of Lippe-Biesterfeld line of the House of Lippe. After the reigning Princes of Lippe, Biesterfeld was the most senior line of the princely house followed by the Counts of Lippe-Weissenfeld and the Princes of Schaumburg-Lippe.

On 20 March 1895 the reigning prince of Lippe, Prince Woldemar died childless. His heir was his brother Alexander who was incapable of ruling on account of a mental illness so a regency had to be established. A decree had been issued in 1890 by the late Prince Woldemar and though kept secret until his death it resulted in Prince Adolf of Schaumburg-Lippe, the brother in law of the German Emperor William II and not Count Ernst being appointed regent.

This act was disputed by Count Ernst who put forward a claim to the regency. Lippe's diet confirmed Prince Adolf as regent on 24 April pending a settlement over the right to the Lippe regency.

In the first scene (1895–97) of the Lippe succession dispute, it was claimed on part of the Schaumburg-Lippe that count Ernest's paternal grandmother, noblewoman Modeste Dorothea Christiane von Unruh (1781–1854) (who belonged to a family of lower nobility) was not of high enough birth to be legitimately a dynastic wife - that would have made progeny born of her ineligible to succeed.

== Regent of Lippe ==
A settlement was reached in 1897 when a commission under the presidency of King Albert of Saxony ruled in favour of the claims of Count Ernst. Prince Adolf then resigned the regency and was replaced by Count Ernst.

The panel assessed that the Lippe dynasts do not need to marry princely ladies in order to preserve dynasticity; the outcome was a verdict that a lady from an old lower-noble family is sufficient. Modeste von Unruh was adjudicated to have fulfilled this criterion.

While regent Count Ernst was snubbed by the German Emperor after writing to William II complaining that the officers of the local garrison did not salute his children, did not address them by the correct style for a ruling family, and that the commanding general at Detmold had personally ordered this. The Emperor's telegraph in response to Count Ernst's request was:

Your letter received. The orders of the commanding General were issued in accordance with my wishes and after inquiry of me. To the regent what is due to the regent, and nothing more. Moreover, I forbid once for all the tone in which you have seen fit to write me.

Ernst remained as regent until his death in Schloss Lopshorn at which point his son Leopold succeeded him as head of the Lippe-Biesterfeld line and regent, before becoming the reigning Prince of Lippe four months later on the death of Prince Alexander.

== Marriage and children ==
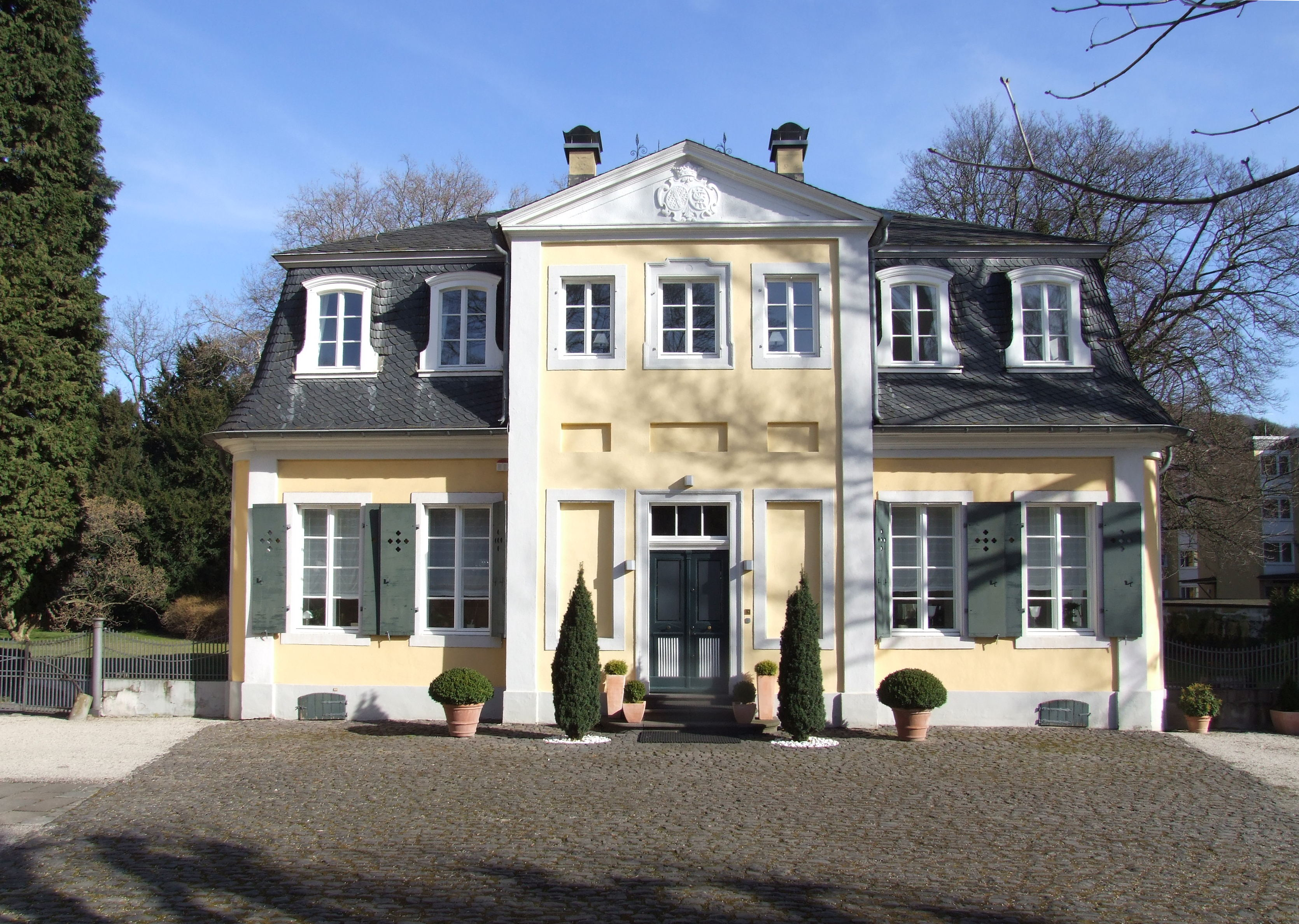
Lippe House at Oberkassel, Bonn

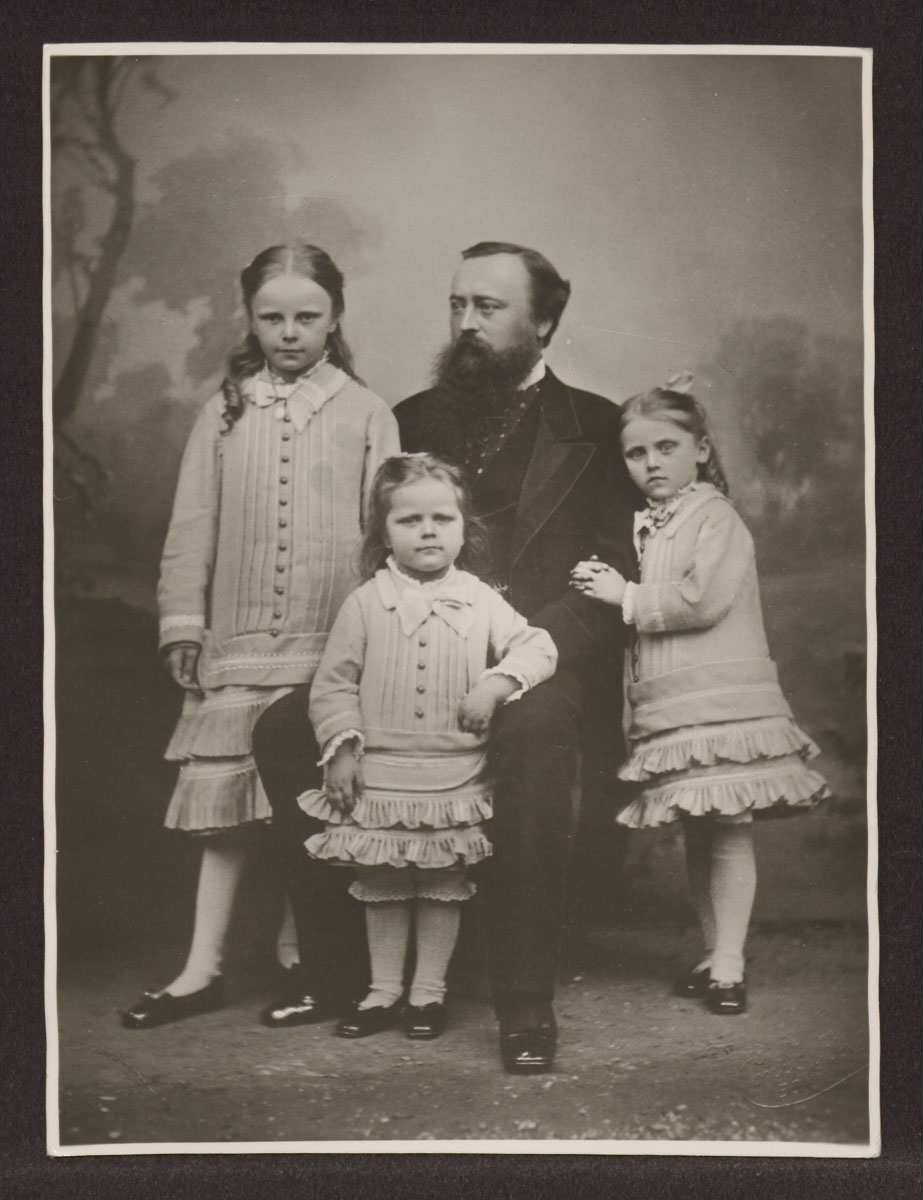
Ernest of Lippe-Biesterfeld with his three daughters Adelheid, Karola, and Mathilde.

Ernest was morganatically married to Countess Karoline Friederike Cecilia of Wartensleben (1844–1905) on the 16 September 1869 in Neuhof. From the marriage he had six children (prince/princess of Lippe since 1905).

- Countess Adelheid (22 June 1870 – 3 September 1948), married Prince Frederick Johann of Saxe-Meiningen; they were the grandparents of Princess Regina of Saxe-Meiningen, wife of Crown Prince Otto of Austria.
- Leopold IV, Prince of Lippe (30 May 1871 – 30 December 1949)
- Prince Bernhard of Lippe (26 August 1872 – 19 June 1934), father of Prince Bernhard of Lippe-Biesterfeld, husband of Queen Juliana of the Netherlands.
- Prince Julius (2 September 1873 – 15 September 1952), married Duchess Marie of Mecklenburg-Strelitz
  - Prince Ernst August of Lippe.
- Princess Karola (2 September 1873 – 23 April 1958)
- Princess Mathilde (27 March 1875 – 12 February 1907)

In the Lippe succession dispute (1904–05), it was claimed on part of the Schaumburg-Lippe that Countess Karoline of Wartensleben (who belonged to a family of counts whose rank of count was from the 18th century, and who were originally of lower nobility) was not noble enough to be legitimately a dynastic wife of count Ernest - that would have made her sons ineligible to succeed. However, it was ruled by the 1905 panel that her birth was high enough and her children with Ernest were dynasts.

== Ancestry ==
Ancestors of Ernest, Count of Lippe-Biesterfeld

8. Karl, Count of Lippe-Biesterfeld
4. Ernst I, Count of Lippe-Biesterfeld
9. Countess Ferdinande of Bentheim-Tecklenburg-Rheda
2. Julius, Count of Lippe-Biesterfeld
10. Karl Philipp von Unruh
5. Modeste von Unruh
11. Elisabeth Henriette Dorothea von Kameke
1. Ernest II, Count of Lippe-Biesterfeld
12. Count Friedrich Carl of Castell-Castell
6. Friedrich, Count of Castell-Castell
13. Countess Amalie of Löwenstein-Wertheim-Virneburg
3. Countess Adelheid of Castell-Castell
14. Charles Louis, Prince of Hohenlohe-Langenburg
7. Princess Emilie of Hohenlohe-Langenburg
15. Countess Amalie Henriette of Solms-Baruth

Ernest, Count of Lippe-Biesterfeld House of Lippe Born: 9 June 1842 Died: 26 September 1904
German nobility
| Preceded by Julius | Count of Lippe-Biesterfeld; 1884–1904 | Succeeded by Leopold |
Regnal titles
| Preceded by Prince Adolf | Regent of Lippe; 1897–1904 | Succeeded by Count Leopold |
