= Arnold Halbach =

Prussian Consul in Pennsylvania, United States

- Born: 3 July 1787; Müngsten, near Remscheid
- Died: 16 May 1869 (aged 81); Baden-Baden
- Citizenship: Prussian
- Occupation: Prussian consul in Philadelphia
- Known for: Great-great-great-grandfather of Beatrix of the Netherlands; Great-grandfather of Alfried Krupp von Bohlen und Halbach
- Spouse: Johanna Karoline Mathilde Bohlen
- Parent(s): Johann Arnold Halbach; Maria Gertrud Hilger

Arnold Halbach (3 July 1787 in Müngsten, near Remscheid – 16 May 1869 in Baden-Baden) was the Prussian Consul in Philadelphia.

== Biography ==
He was the son of Johann Arnold Halbach and in 1810, he founded a steel plant in the US, to supply steel for the local manufacturers of gun barrels. In 1828, the firm "Johann and Caspar Halbach and sons" had to close the plant.

From 1828 to 1838, he was the Prussian consul in Philadelphia. From 1840, he lived in Baden-Baden with his wife Johanna Karoline Mathilde Bohlen (1800-1882). Their daughter Matilde Halbach (1822-1844) was the mother of Countess Karoline of Wartensleben, grandmother of Leopold IV, Prince of Lippe and a great-great-grandmother of Queen Beatrix of the Netherlands. Their son Gustav von Bohlen und Halbach (1831-1890) and grandson Gustav Krupp von Bohlen und Halbach (1870-1950) also had a career in the diplomatic service.
