= George II of Saxe-Meiningen =

German noble (1826–1914)

Georg II
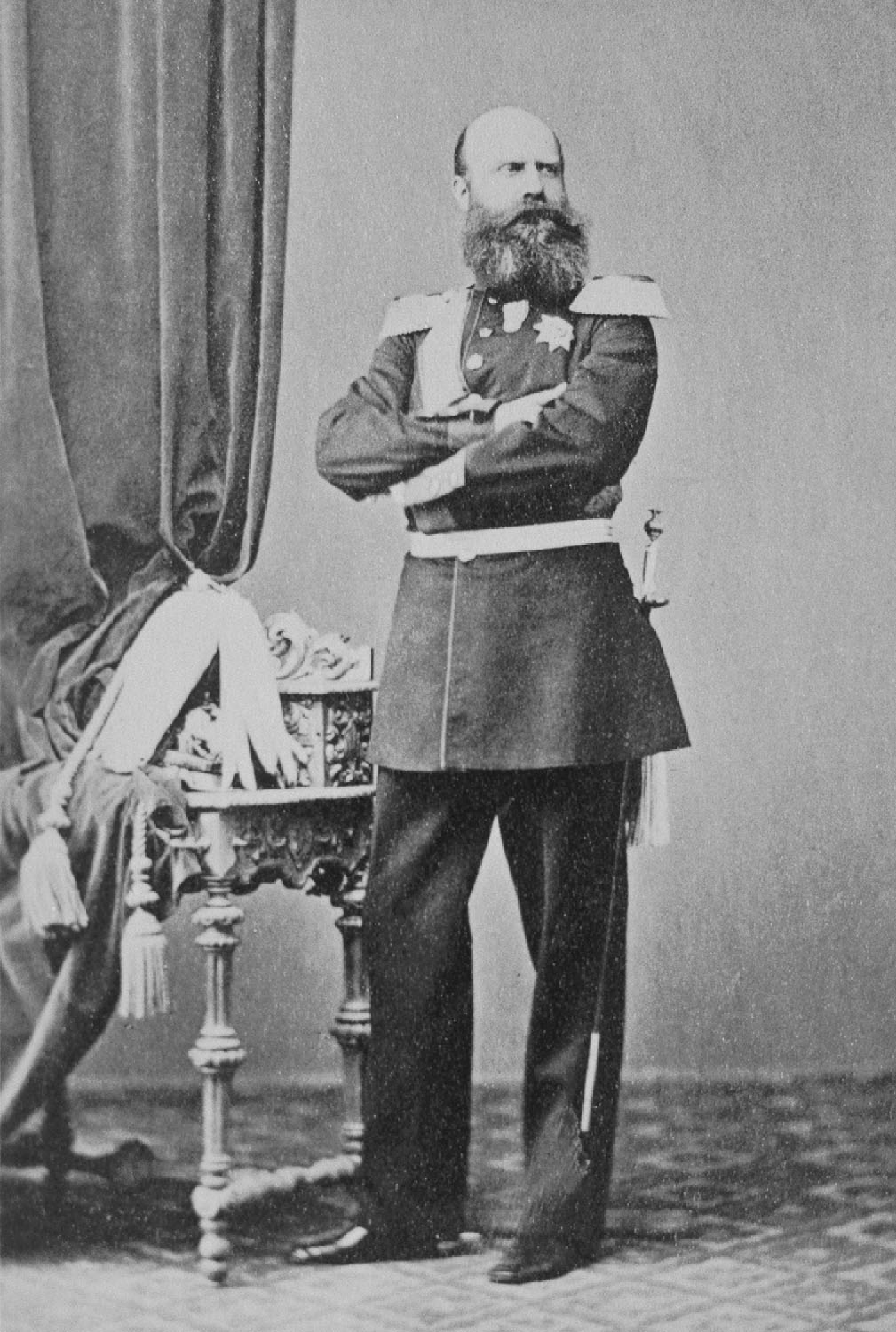
- Georg in 1871

Duke of Saxe-Meiningen
- Reign: 20 September 1866 – 25 June 1914
- Predecessor: Bernhard II
- Successor: Bernhard III
- Born: 2 April 1826; Meiningen, Saxe-Meiningen
- Died: 25 June 1914 (aged 88); Bad Wildungen, German Empire
- Spouses: Princess Charlotte of Prussia (m. 1850; died 1855) Princess Feodora of Hohenlohe-Langenburg (m. 1858; died 1872) Ellen Franz (m. 1873)
- Issue: Bernhard III, Duke of Saxe-Meiningen; Prince Georg Albrecht; Princess Marie Elisabeth; Ernst, Prince of Saxe-Meiningen; Prince Frederick John; Prince Viktor
- House: Saxe-Meiningen
- Father: Bernhard II
- Mother: Marie Frederica of Hesse-Kassel
- Religion: Lutheranism

Georg II, Duke of Saxe-Meiningen (2 April 1826 – 25 June 1914), was the penultimate Duke of Saxe-Meiningen, reigning from 1866 to 1914. For his support for his successful court theatre he was also known as the Theaterherzog (theatre duke).

== Family and early life ==
Georg was the only son of Bernhard II, Duke of Saxe-Meiningen and his wife Princess Marie Frederica of Hesse-Kassel. His birth on 2 April 1826 was met with great relief as the succession to the duchy was in jeopardy due to a lack of male heirs in the family. Georg remained an only child for seventeen years, until the birth of his sister Princess Augusta in 1843.

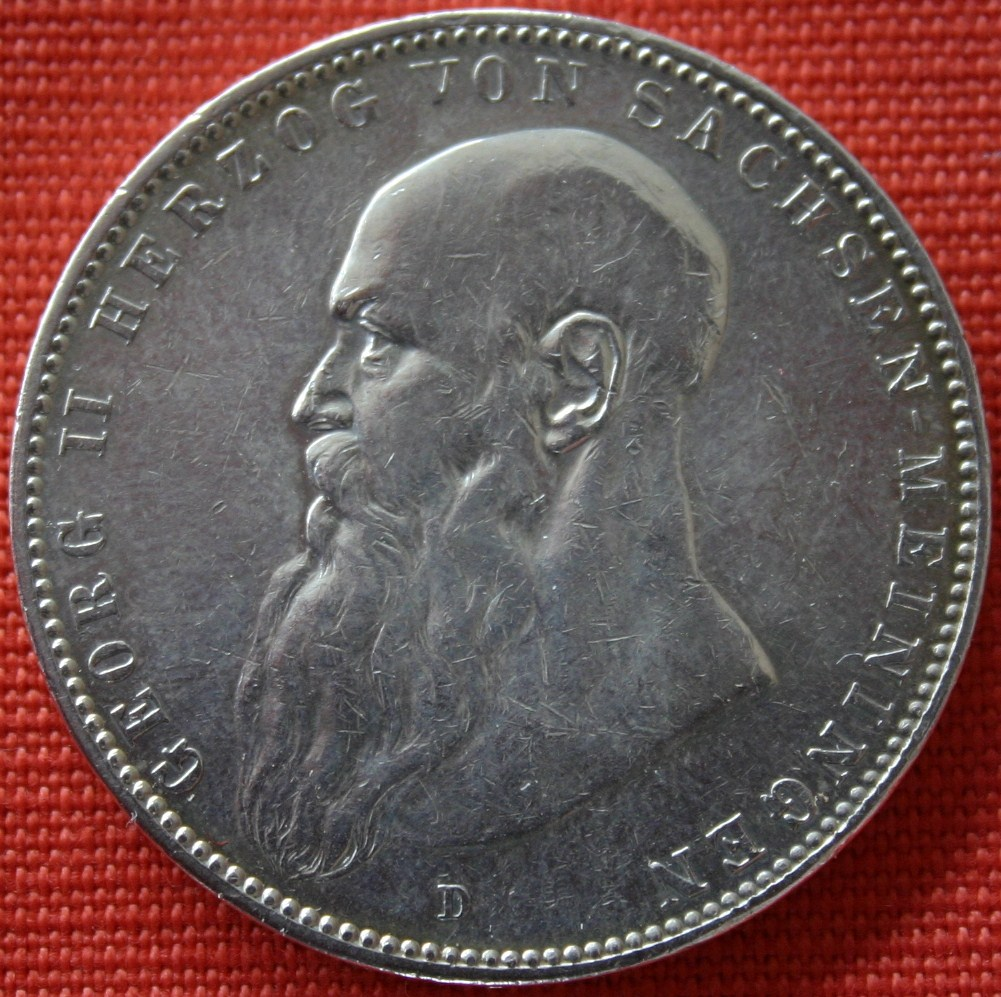
A five mark depicting Georg II, 1908.

Georg spent his first few years under the supervision of his parents and grandmother the Dowager Duchess Luise Eleonore. It was the latter who instilled upon Georg the patriotic virtues of his heritage, as well as the sense of duty needed to rule a duchy.

In 1862, his only sister married Prince Moritz of Saxe-Altenburg, a younger son of Georg, Duke of Saxe-Altenburg. They would be the parents of Ernst II, Duke of Saxe-Altenburg, the last reigning Duke of Saxe-Altenburg.

=== Duke of Saxe-Meiningen ===
Georg succeeded his father as Duke of Saxe-Meiningen on 20 September 1866, when Bernhard was forced to abdicate in favor of his son following the defeat of Austria in the Austro-Prussian War. In opposition to his father, Georg had sided with the Prussians during the war and was rewarded with a position of Lieutenant General of the Prussian army. The young duke was familiar enough with Prussian politics to regard their attitudes as impractical. During the Franco-Prussian War, Georg led two regiments of soldiers from Meiningen and had the honor of capturing the first French flags at the Battle of Froeschweiler. Notably, he fought in nearly every battle during the war. Georg was a member of Wilhelm I's staff when he entered Paris and remained a friend of the Emperor until the latter's death in 1888.

== Marriages ==
=== First ===
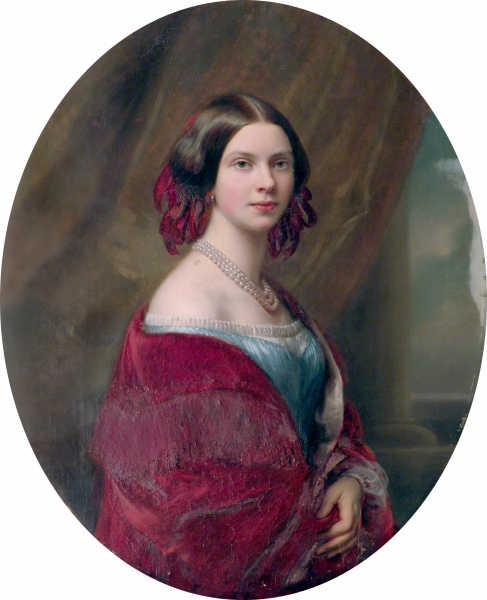
Georg's first wife Charlotte of Prussia (artist unknown).

Georg was married firstly in Charlottenburg on 18 May 1850 to the Princess Charlotte of Prussia. She was the eldest daughter of Prince Albert of Prussia and Princess Marianne of the Netherlands, and was a granddaughter of both Frederick William III of Prussia and William I of the Netherlands.

They had four children:

- Bernhard III, Duke of Saxe-Meiningen (1 April 1851 – 16 January 1928). he married Princess Charlotte of Prussia on 18 February 1878. They had one daughter, Princess Feodora of Saxe-Meiningen.
- Prince Georg Albrecht (12 April 1852 – 27 January 1855). died at two years old.
- Princess Marie Elisabeth of Saxe-Meiningen (23 September 1853 – 22 February 1923).
- unnamed son (29 – 30 March 1855). died at a day old.

Although couple had a short engagement, it was a love match. Among the wedding gifts was an opulent old villa on Lake Como from her mother Marianne. It was renamed the Villa Carlotta in the bride's honor. They spent the next five years in Berlin and Potsdam but returned to Meiningen for the birth of their children.

On 27 January 1855, their second son Georg died. Charlotte would follow him two months later, dying in childbirth and leaving Georg inconsolable. He succeeded his father as Duke of Saxe-Meiningen in 1866, eleven years after Charlotte's death.

=== Second ===
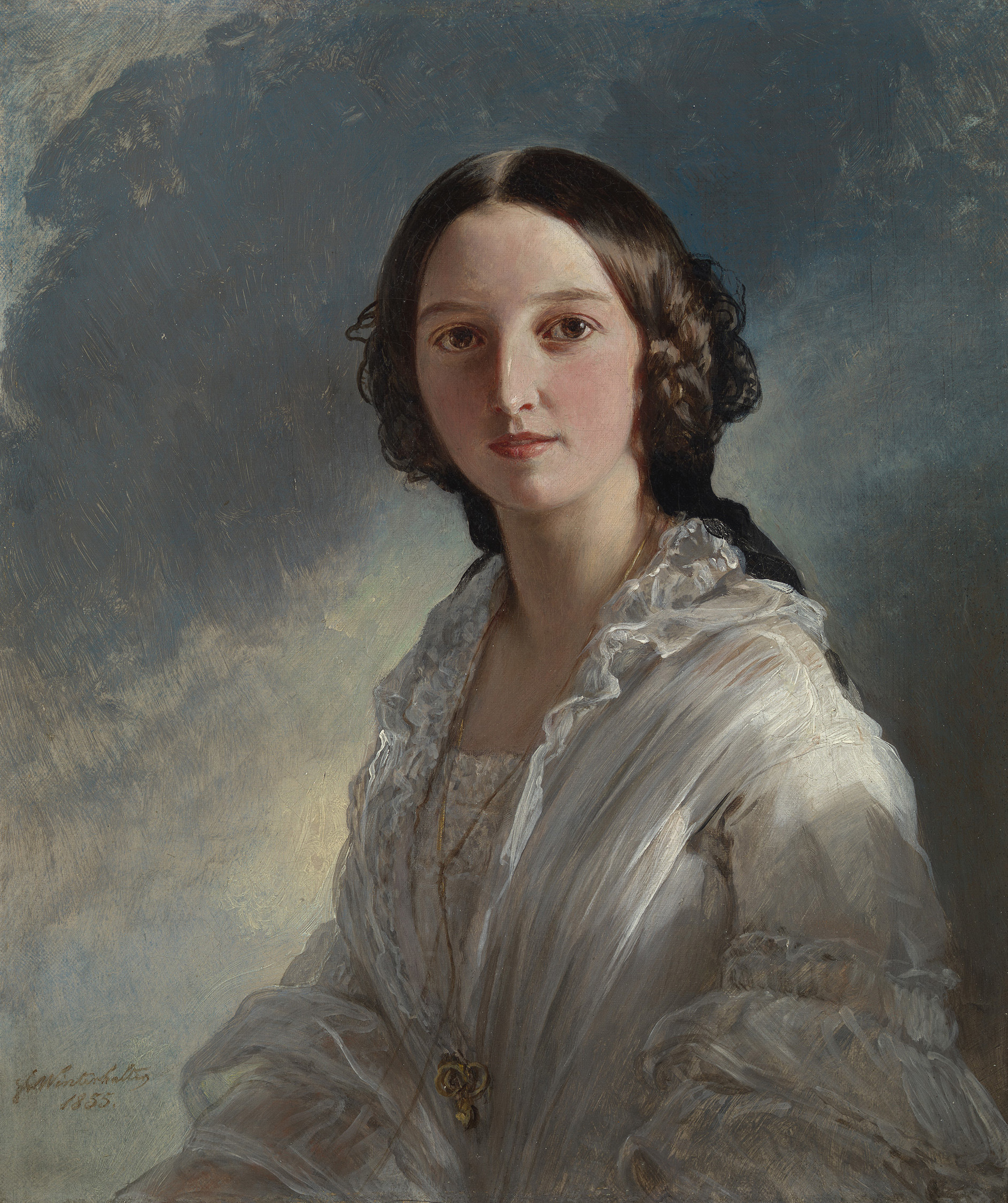
Georg's second wife Princess Feodora of Hohenlohe-Langenburg, c. 1860. Portrait by Franz Xaver Winterhalter

Despite his recent widowhood, Georg went on a search for a new wife, if only to provide a mother for his two young children. Georg met his second cousin Princess Feodora of Hohenlohe-Langenburg while he was on his way to Italy; they became engaged almost at once. She was a niece of Queen Victoria, being a daughter of Victoria's half-sister Princess Feodora of Leiningen and her husband Ernst I, Prince of Hohenlohe-Langenburg. On 23 October 1858, they married at Langenburg.

Georg and Feodora had three sons:

- Prince Ernst Bernhard of Saxe-Meiningen (27 September 1859 – 29 December 1941) he married Katharina Jensen on 20 September 1892. They had six children.
- Prince Frederick Johann of Saxe-Meiningen (12 October 1861 – 23 August 1914) he married Countess Adelaide of Lippe-Biesterfeld on 24 April 1889. They had six children.
- Prince Viktor of Saxe-Meiningen (14 – 17 May 1865).

Their marriage was unhappy however. Georg had never become reconciled to Charlotte's death and Feodora was not temperamentally suited for the life she was expected to lead. She had no intellectual or artistic attainments; even worse, she had no interest in developing any. Despite this fact, Georg attempted to educate her, as he was a great lover of the arts, especially theater. Her mother approved, stating it was "very sensible of him indeed to arrange for his bride to be much occupied with lessons, to take drawing lessons, and to hear lectures on history". Georg soon realized however that she would never be as witty and clever as Charlotte. After the death of their third son, Feodora stayed away from Meiningen for as much as decently possible. In 1866, he succeeded as Duke of Saxe-Meiningen, making her "Duchess consort of Saxe-Meiningen".

Feodora contracted scarlet fever in January 1872, and died the following month. Despite the many differences between them, Georg had remained fond of her; when she became sick, he was genuinely distraught and sent telegrams to her parents twice daily.

=== Third ===
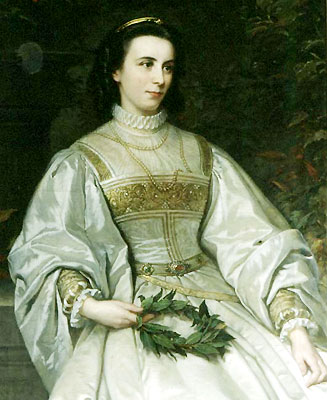
Georg's third wife Ellen Franz, c. 1870. Portrait by Oskar Begas

He was married thirdly and unequally in Liebenstein on 18 March 1873 to Ellen Franz, a former actress. She was given her own style, being known as Helene, "Baroness von Holdburg" shortly before their wedding and after their marriage.

This marriage was morganatic, and greatly angered Kaiser Wilhelm. Georg in turn became increasingly angry and defensive at anyone who failed to recognize his wife and treat her as an equal. Most Germans supported Georg's decision to marry, but Wilhelm felt particularly upset because Georg's first wife had been a kinswoman of his. Wilhelm was not the only one who objected to the marriage; Georg's father ex-Duke Bernhard was equally angry and threatened to appeal directly to the people with the mistaken view that they would support his opinion. Officials and ministers of the Saxe-Meiningen court also objected to the match. Many resigned their offices and their wives openly insulted Ellen. The army also refused to salute her, further angering Duke Georg. He sent an emissary to Berlin with a complaint to Wilhelm, who responded by ordering that all officers must in the future salute Ellen as Baroness von Heldburg. She was never styled as "Duchess of Saxe-Meiningen" like his second wife.

The couple had no children. Well loved by the people, she and Duke Georg created and developed the progressive Meiningen Theater.

== Relationship to theatre and music ==
=== Meiningen Ensemble ===
After the Franco-Prussian War, Georg devoted himself to theatre. He was one of the greatest intellectuals among the higher nobility during the German Empire. He is particularly known for developing the Meiningen Ensemble using his court theatre. Using his knowledge of art history and his drawing skills, he designed highly detailed, historically accurate scenery, costumes, and properties. In addition, he choreographed large crowd scenes that stunned audiences across Europe. He and his ensemble toured Europe extensively, and had a profound effect on theatre production across the continent. There is no doubt that Realism saw the development of the director as a separate entity, someone with an eye to oversee, someone responsible for the overall conception, interpretation, style and detail of the theatrical performance. The Meiningen Ensemble from its roots in the late 1830s under the directorships of Georg II and Ludwig Chronegk, proceeded to develop a theatre company bereft of theatre-managers and the star system. A system centered on realistic acting and staging and well-developed 'unified' productions. The Ensemble which began as a court theatre but started touring in 1874, used detailed research of people, locations, costumes and set, along with highly choreographed and individually detailed crowd scenes, to create productions which were esthetically unified and realistic in their presentations.

In an article for the Deutsche Bühne, the Duke outlined his principles for directing a play, the most important were the creation of a Stage Picture (the pictorial effect created by the synthesis of the actors with the set and props), historical exactitude in the mise en scene, an acting style which used Precise Gestural and Vocal Imitation, the use of Period or Authentic Clothing and Costumes and the use of Group Orchestration by precise planning and direction of all group and crowd scenes

The initial aim of the Meiningen Ensemble was to create, within the context of an ensemble, historical exactitude of the mise en scene. The Meiningen company sought to create the illusion of natural space within the confines of the proscenium arch. Duke Georg was concerned mainly with creating a naturalistic illusory atmosphere where the actor could establish or re-create authenticity in performance. Chronegk and the Duke prepared sketches and diagrams showing actors how to walk and move in period clothing to achieve a naturalistic feel to stage characterization. The Meiningen productions influenced playwrights like Henrik Ibsen, actors like Henry Irving and directors like Antoine and Stanislavsky.

The conventions of realism for the Meiningen seemed to create the means by which a theatre artist creates the illusion of everyday life. They saw that art should copy science by depicting life 'as it is' without direct comment, interpretation and the structural edifice of the well made play. The Duke believed that a lifelike reality was achieved on stage through a careful study of the play and showing this in stage movement, composition and stage business. His major contribution to the stage was not just his use of realistic settings and costumes but in the way he tried to use and integrate performers as part of the mise en scene. The use of costume did not merely reflect historical accuracy but attempted to help actors perform in a style and mode which integrated with other elements. He demanded that all the actors were at most rehearsals and he carefully worked out the actions of even everyone in crowd scenes. Individual members of crowds and main actors alike were expected to provide specific research and character analysis related to the events depicted on stage. He was known for his great vision and memory and he often worked without a prompt book or script, working from his head and using a runner to ferry his ideas to his assistant Chronegk. Because his work toured extensively from 1874 to 1890, Meiningen's unified productions had a great impact on the theatre world. He is widely considered the theatre's first Modern director.

=== Meiningen Court Orchestra ===
The Duke was also the patron of one of Europe's leading orchestras, the Meiningen Court Orchestra. The orchestra attained its distinction after the Duke hired the conductor Hans von Bülow in 1880. Bülow instituted stringent rehearsal methods and, with the Duke's agreement, hired eight musicians, raising its membership to 44. He offered the orchestra as a trial ensemble to Johannes Brahms, who was to try out his Second Piano Concerto and Third Symphony with the orchestra and premiered his Fourth Symphony there, conducting it himself. A dispute with Brahms over who was to conduct the premiere of his Fourth Symphony in Frankfurt led Bülow to resign (he was scheduled to premiere it there, but Brahms pre-empted him by conducting it with a local orchestra). Bülow was succeeded briefly by his 20-year-old assistant Richard Strauss, who resigned after a month, and then by Fritz Steinbach. Steinbach championed the music of Brahms, instituting Brahms Festivals in 1895 and 1897 in Meiningen with the composer present. A private concert by the Meiningen Court Orchestra and Steinbach for Brahms in 1891 led the composer to notice the artistry of the ensemble's first clarinetist, Richard Mühlfeld; Brahms promised to compose music for Mühlfeld, and did indeed compose his Clarinet Trio, Clarinet Quintet, and two Clarinet Sonatas. In 1897 the Duke undertook the construction of a Brahms monument in Meiningen's English gardens, sculpted by Adolf von Hildebrand.

== Later life ==
In his later life, Georg suffered from acute deafness and retired from active life. He had been fond of hunting and traveling, and was a collector of antiques and manuscripts. He died on 25 June 1914 at Bad Wildungen and was succeeded by his eldest son Bernhard.

Georg is buried at Parkfriedhof Meiningen, next to his third wife.

== Honours ==
- (Saxe-Coburg and Gotha) (Duchy of Saxe-Altenburg) (Saxe-Meiningen) Ernestine duchies: Grand Cross of the Saxe-Ernestine House Order, April 1844; Joint Grand Master, 20 September 1866
- Saxe-Weimar-Eisenach: Grand Cross of the Order of the White Falcon, 23 September 1845
- Kingdom of Saxony: Knight of the Order of the Rue Crown, 1845
- Kingdom of Prussia:
  - Knight of the Order of the Black Eagle, 25 December 1849; with Collar, 1854
  - Grand Commander's Cross of the Royal House Order of Hohenzollern, 11 March 1878
- Kingdom of Hanover: Grand Cross of the Royal Guelphic Order, 1858
- Oldenburg: Grand Cross of the House and Merit Order of Peter Frederick Louis, with Crown in Gold, 14 October 1862
- Duchy of Anhalt: Grand Cross of the House Order of Albert the Bear, 15 December 1865
- Württemberg: Grand Cross of the Order of the Württemberg Crown, 1866
- Kingdom of Italy: Knight of the Supreme Order of the Most Holy Annunciation, 18 April 1869
- (Austrian Empire) (Kingdom of Hungary) Austria-Hungary: Grand Cross of the Royal Hungarian Order of St. Stephen, 1870
- Kingdom of Bavaria: Knight of the Order of St. Hubert, 1888

== Ancestry ==
Ancestors of George II of Saxe-Meiningen

Anton Ulrich, Duke of Saxe-Meiningen
Georg I, Duke of Saxe-Meiningen
Princess Charlotte Amalie of Hesse-Philippsthal
Bernhard II, Duke of Saxe-Meiningen
Christian Albrecht, Prince of Hohenlohe-Langenburg
Princess Louise Eleonore of Hohenlohe-Langenburg
Princess Caroline of Stolberg-Gedern
Georg II, Duke of Saxe-Meiningen
William I, Elector of Hesse
William II, Elector of Hesse
Princess Wilhelmina Caroline of Denmark
Princess Marie Frederica of Hesse-Kassel
Frederick William II of Prussia
Princess Augusta of Prussia
Princess Frederica Louisa of Hesse-Darmstadt

== See also ==
- Schloss and park Altenstein

== Sources ==
- "Георг II, герцог саксен-мейнингенский" . Brockhaus and Efron Encyclopedic Dictionary (in Russian). 1906.
- Eckersley, M. (1995). It's All a Matter of Style – Naturalistic Theatre Forms. Melbourne: Mask. Drama Victoria.
- Koller, Ann Marie (1984). The Theater Duke: George II of Saxe-Meiningen and the German Stage. Stanford University Press. ISBN 0-8047-1196-8.

George II of Saxe-Meiningen House of Saxe-Meiningen Cadet branch of the House of Wettin Born: 2 April 1826 Died: 25 June 1914
Regnal titles
Preceded by Bernhard II	Duke of Saxe-Meiningen; 1866–1914	Succeeded by Bernhard III
