= Countess Karoline von Wartensleben =

German noblewoman (1844–1905)

Karoline von Wartensleben
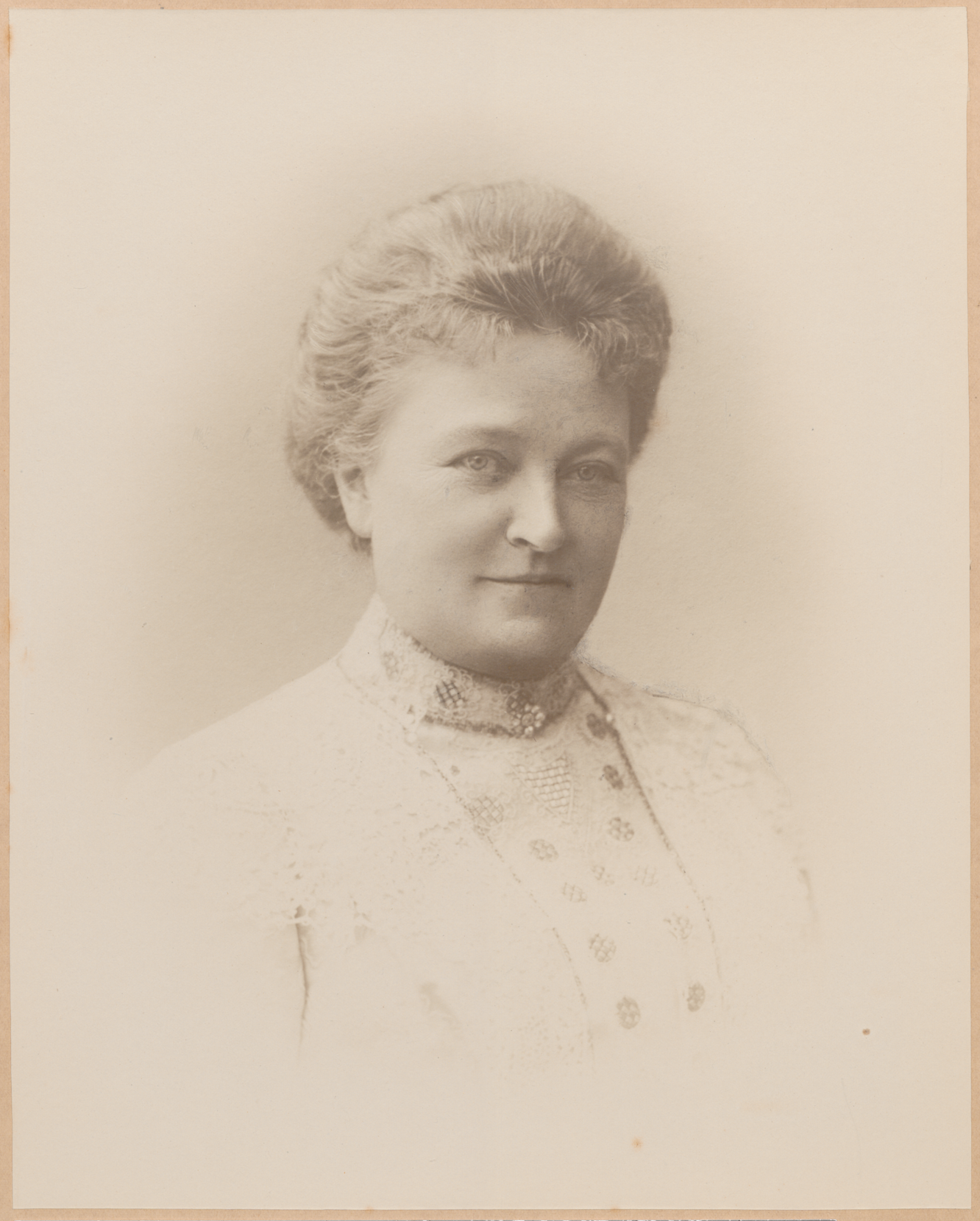
- Full name: Karoline Friederike Cäcilie Klothilde
- Born: 8 April 1844; Mannheim, Grand Duchy of Baden
- Died: 10 July 1905 (aged 61); Detmold, German Empire
- Noble family: von Wartensleben
- Spouse: Ernest II, Count of Lippe-Biesterfeld
- Issue: Adelheid, Princess Frederick Johann of Saxe-Meiningen; Leopold IV, Prince of Lippe; Prince Bernhard; Prince Julius; Princess Karola; Princess Mathilde
- Father: Leopold Otto Frederick, Count von Wartensleben
- Mother: Mathilde Halbach

Countess Karoline Friederike Cäcilie Klothilde von Wartensleben (6 April 1844 in Mannheim – 10 July 1905 in Detmold) was a German noblewoman who was the wife of Ernest II, Regent of the Principality of Lippe.

== Early life ==
She was a daughter of the 1841 marriage of Count Leopold von Wartensleben (1818-1846) with Mathilde Halbach (1822-1844), daughter of Arnold Halbach, a German industrialist and Prussian consul in Philadelphia (whose family made an important fortune – with the firm Johann and Caspar Halbach & sons' steel plant, est. in 1828 – in Germany/US ammunition trade), but the question of her hereditary rank became an important issue in a 1905 dispute over succession to the throne of the principality of Lippe.

== Marriage ==
On 16 September 1869 in Neudorf in the Province of Posen, she married Ernest II, Count of Lippe-Biesterfeld (1842-1904), who was regent of Lippe from 1897 to 1904.

In the Lippe succession dispute (1904–1905), Schaumburg-Lippe claimed that Karoline, who belonged to a non-reigning family of Germany's lower nobility elevated to the rank of Graf (Count) in the 18th century (and whose mother was not noble by birth), was of insufficiently high rank by birth to be a dynastic consort for a Count of Lippe — potentially rendering her sons ineligible to succeed to the throne of the Lippe principality.

On 25 October 1905 the German Empire's arbitration panel (Reichsgericht) accepted an 1897 arbitration panel's finding that until at least 1815 marriages between the House of Lippe and untitled persons, if of old rather than recent noble status, were eligible to marry Lippe prince and counts dynastically.

This was based on the finding that, such marriages, having been banned neither by previous house law nor by any clear marital pattern to the contrary prior to 1815, and that no change in dynastic policy had been explicitly implemented subsequently, the 1869 marriage to a Wartensleben countess was valid for purposes of transmitting succession rights to the descendants.

Thus Karoline's children with the regent of Lippe, Count Ernest, became dynasts and the Schaumburg-Lippe Prince desisted his formal opposition. The monarchs, courts and legislatures of Germany accepted the decision and her eldest son was immediately recognised as Leopold IV, sovereign Prince of Lippe, reigning until compelled to abdicate in 1918 when the German Empire collapsed following the loss of World War I.

== Issue ==
Ernest and Karoline had six children; they were all titular counts and countesses of Lippe-Biesterfeld at birth; the ruling in 1905 made them princes and princesses of Lippe.

- Adelaide (22 June 1870 – 3 September 1948) married Prince Frederick Johann of Saxe-Meiningen; they were the grandparents of Princess Regina of Saxe-Meiningen, wife of Crown Prince Otto of Austria
- Leopold IV (30 May 1871 – 30 December 1949)
- Bernhard (26 August 1872 – 19 June 1934), married morganatically to Baroness Armgard von Sierstorpff-Cramm (1883-1971) and was the father of Prince Bernhard of Lippe-Biesterfeld (1911-2004), the husband of Queen Juliana of the Netherlands
- Julius Ernst (2 September 1873 – 15 September 1952) married Duchess Marie of Mecklenburg-Strelitz
- Karola (2 September 1873 – 23 April 1958)
- Mathilde (27 March 1875 – 12 February 1907)
