= Julius, Count of Lippe-Biesterfeld =

Julius
- Count of Lippe-Biesterfeld
- Born: 2 April 1812; Oberkassel, Kingdom of Prussia
- Died: 17 May 1884 (aged 72); Baden-Baden, Grand Duchy of Baden
- Spouse: Adelheid of Castell-Castell
- Issue: Count Ernest; Emilie, Princess of Salm-Horstmar; Ernest, Count of Lippe-Biesterfeld; Count Adalbert; Countess Mathilde; Prince Leopold; Count Kasimir; Count Oscar; Countess Johanna; Count Friedrich; Countess Elisabeth; Prince Rudolf; Prince Friedrich Wilhelm; Count Friedrich Karl
Names
- German: Julius Peter Hermann August
- House: Lippe-Biesterfeld
- Father: Ernest I, Count of Lippe-Biesterfeld
- Mother: Modeste von Unruh

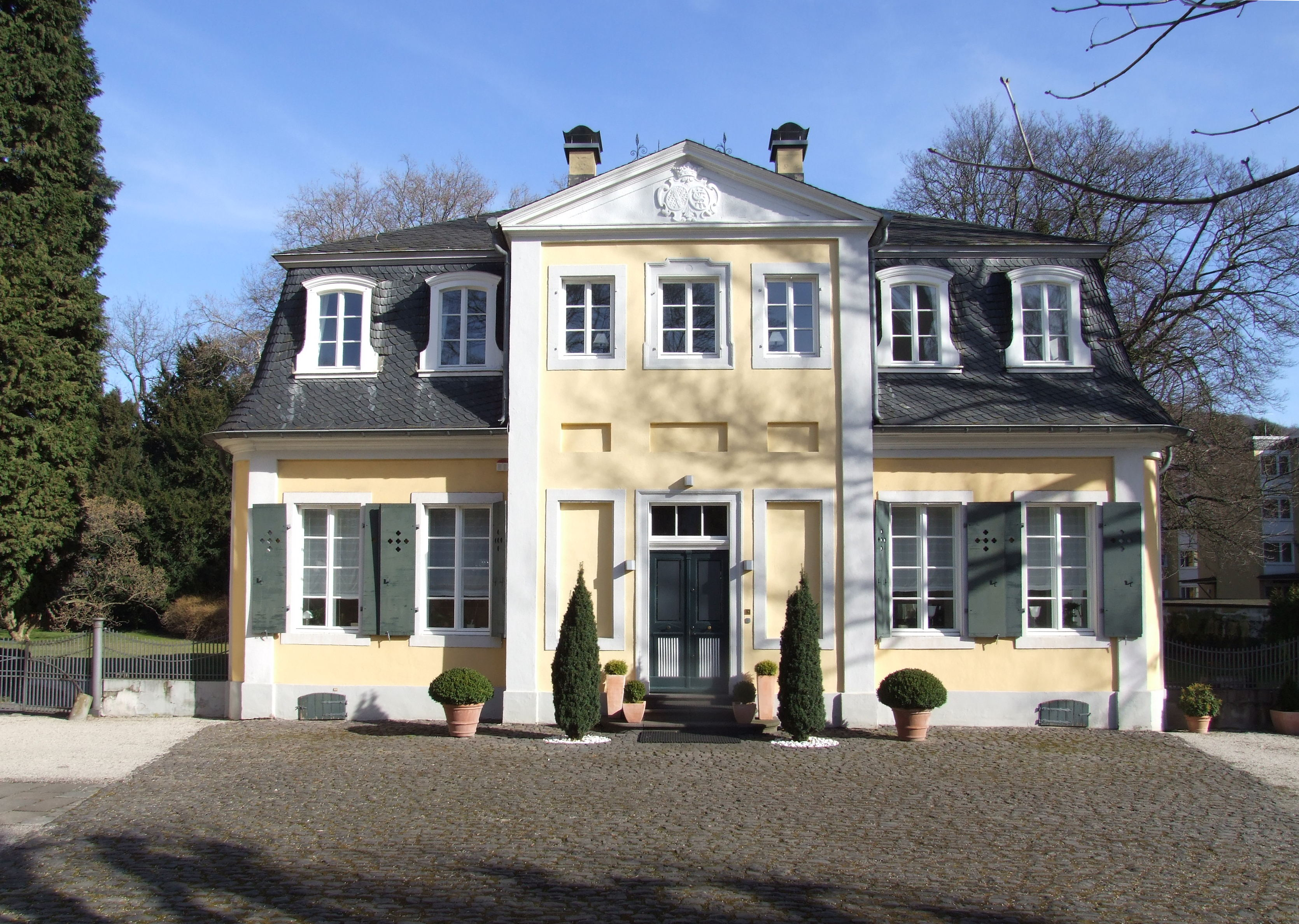
Lippe House at Oberkassel, Bonn, inherited from Edler von Meinertzhagen, owned by the Lippe-Biesterfeld branch since 1770

Julius, Count of Lippe-Biesterfeld (German: Julius Peter Hermann August Graf und Edler Herr zur Lippe-Biesterfeld; 2 April 1812 – 17 May 1884) was Count of Lippe-Biesterfeld from 1840 to 1884 and father of Ernest II, regent of the Principality of Lippe.

== Early life ==
Julius was born at Oberkassel, Kingdom of Prussia (now in North Rhine-Westphalia, Germany), fifth child and second son of Ernest I, Count of Lippe-Biesterfeld (1777–1840, son of Karl, Count of Lippe-Biesterfeld and Countess Ferdinande of Bentheim-Tecklenburg-Rheda) and his wife Modeste von Unruh (1781–1854, daughter of Karl Philipp von Unruh and Elisabeth Henriette Dorothea von Kameke).

== Marriage ==
Julius married on 30 April 1839 at Castell to Countess Adelheid Clotilde Auguste of Castell-Castell (1818–1900), daughter of Friedrich, Count of Castell-Castell, and his wife, Princess Emilie of Hohenlohe-Langenburg, daughter of Karl Ludwig, Prince of Hohenlohe-Langenburg.

They had fourteen children:

- Count Ernest of Lippe-Biesterfeld (20 March 1840 – 28 March 1840);
- Countess Emilie Amalie Modeste Ernestine Bernhardine of Lippe-Biesterfeld (1 February 1841 – 11 February 1892), married in 1864 to Otto I, Prince of Salm-Horstmar, had issue;
- Ernest, Count of Lippe-Biesterfeld (9 June 1842 – 26 September 1904), married in 1869 to Countess Karoline von Wartensleben, had issue;
- Count Adalbert of Lippe-Biesterfeld (15 October 1843 – 2 December 1890);
- Countess Mathilde of Lippe-Biesterfeld (7 December 1844 – 10 January 1890);
- Prince Leopold of Lippe (12 May 1846 – 28 January 1908);
- Count Kasimir of Lippe-Biesterfeld (5 October 1847 – 16 February 1880);
- Count Oscar of Lippe-Biesterfeld (18 December 1848 – 17 January 1849);
- Countess Johanna of Lippe-Biesterfeld (6 March 1851 – 31 January 1859);
- Friedrich Count of Lippe-Biesterfeld (10 May 1852 – 15 August 1892), married in 1882 to Princess Marie of Löwenstein-Wertheim-Freudenberg, had issue;
- Countess Elisabeth of Lippe-Biesterfeld (25 September 1853 – 24 January 1859);
- Prince Rudolf of Lippe (27 April 1856 – 21 June 1931), married in 1889 to Princess Louise of Ardeck, had issue (among which was Princess Marie Adelheid of Lippe);
- Prince Friedrich Wilhelm of Lippe (16 July 1858 – 6 August 1914), married in 1895 to Countess Gisela of Ysenburg and Büdingen in Meerholz (granddaughter of Ernst Casimir II, 2nd Prince of Ysenburg and Büdingen), had issue (among which was Princess Calixta of Lippe-Biesterfeld, wife of Prince Waldemar of Prussia);
- Count Friedrich Karl of Lippe-Biesterfeld (19 June 1861 – 1 April 1901).

== Ancestry ==
Ancestors of Julius, Count of Lippe-Biesterfeld

8. Frederick Charles Augustus, Count of Lippe
4. Karl, Count of Lippe-Biesterfeld
9. Countess Barbara of Solms-Baruth
2. Ernest I, Count of Lippe-Biesterfeld
10. Moritz Kasimir I, Count of Bentheim-Tecklenburg-Rheda
5. Countess Ferdinande of Bentheim-Tecklenburg-Rheda
11. Countess Albertine of Ysenburg and Büdingen in Meerholz
1. Julius, Count of Lippe-Biesterfeld
12. Ludwig Philipp von Unruh
6. Karl Philipp von Unruh
13. Christiane Eleonora de Bruyn
3. Modeste von Unruh
14. Otto von Kameke
7. Elisabeth Henriette Dorothea von Kameke
15. Countess Johanna of Oldenburg

== Notes and sources ==
- L'Allemagne dynastique, Huberty, Giraud, Magdelaine, Reference: II 288
- Europäische Stammtafeln, Band I, Frank Baron Freytag von Loringhoven, 1975, Isenburg, W. K. Prinz von, Reference: Page 148
- Gens Nostra, Reference: 1962

Julius, Count of Lippe-Biesterfeld House of Lippe-Biesterfeld Cadet branch of the House of Lippe Born: 2 April 1812 Died: 17 May 1884
German nobility
| Preceded by Ernest I | Count of Lippe-Biesterfeld; 1840–1884 | Succeeded by Ernest II |
