= Armgard von Cramm =

Baroness Armgard
- Countess Bodo of Oeynhausen; Princess Bernhard of Lippe-Biesterfeld
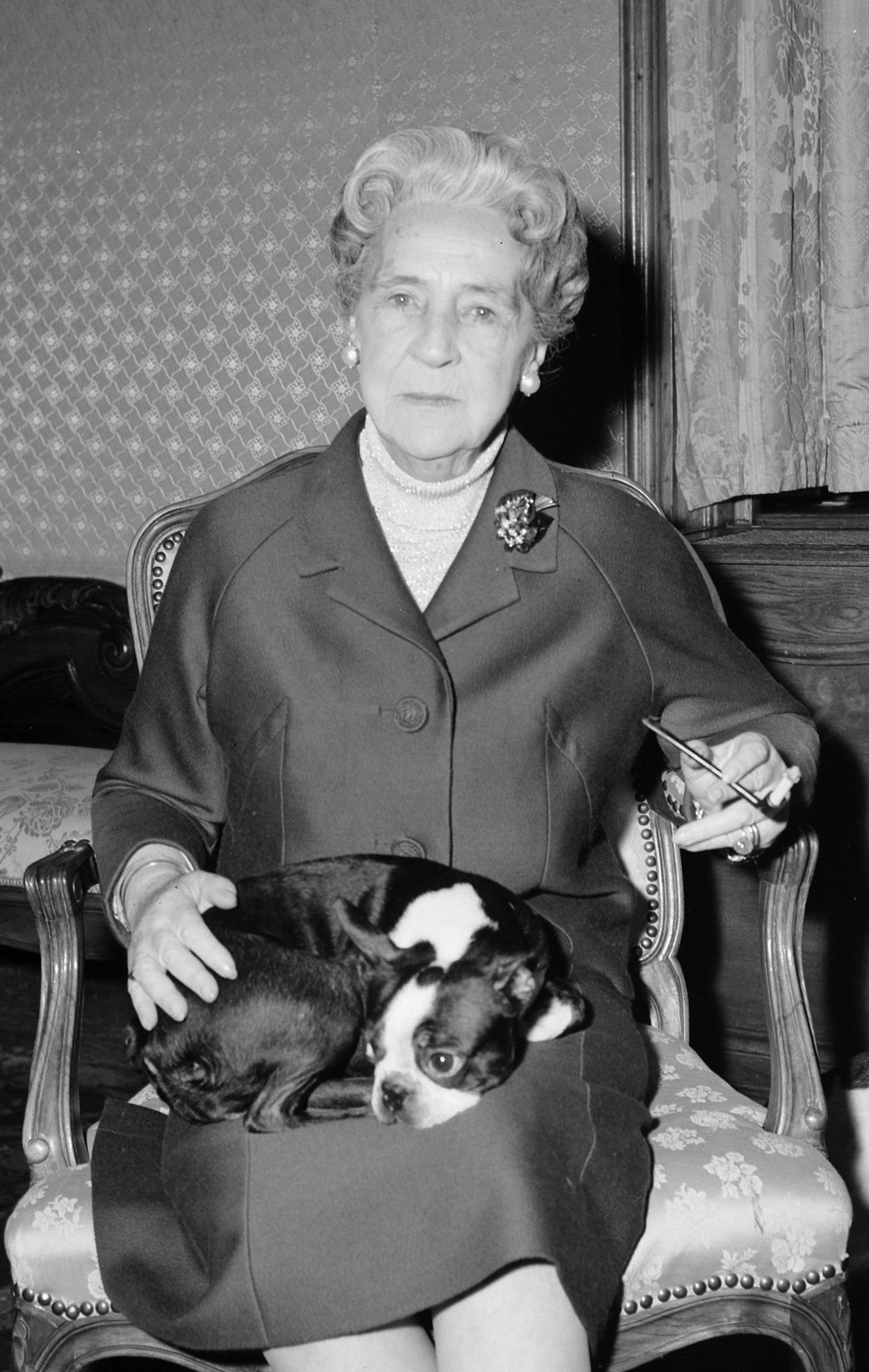
- Princess Armgard in 1964
- Born: 18 December 1883; Bad Driburg, Kingdom of Prussia, German Empire
- Died: 27 April 1971 (aged 87); Diepenheim, Netherlands
- Spouse: Count Bodo of Oeynhausen (m. 1905; div. 1908) Prince Bernhard of Lippe-Biesterfeld (m. 1909; died 1934)
- Issue: Bernhard, Prince Consort of the Netherlands; Prince Aschwin of Lippe-Biesterfeld
Names
- German: Armgard Kunigunde Alharde Agnes Oda
- House: Cramm
- Father: Baron Aschwin of Sierstorpff-Cramm
- Mother: Baroness Hedwig of Sierstorpff-Driburg

Baroness Armgard of Sierstorpff-Cramm, known as Armgard von Cramm (German: Armgard Kunigunde Alharda Agnes Oda von Cramm; 18 December 1883 – 27 April 1971) was the mother of Prince Bernhard of Lippe-Biesterfeld, Prince consort of Queen Juliana of the Netherlands.

== Early life ==
Armgard was born at Bad Driburg, Kingdom of Prussia (now in North Rhine-Westphalia, Germany), as the fourth child and fourth daughter of Baron Aschwin of Sierstorpff-Cramm, and his wife, Baroness Hedwig of Sierstorpff-Driburg. By birth, she belonged to the ancient German Cramm family.

== Marriages ==
Armgard married on 24 October 1905 at Hanover to Count Bodo von Oeynhausen, an officer in the 8th Hussars in Paderborn, son of Count Erich von Oeynhausen and his wife, Therese von Lenthe. They divorced in 1908 and had no children.

Armgard married secondly, after the death of her ex-husband, on 4 March 1909 at Oelber, Brunswick to Prince Bernhard of Lippe-Biesterfeld, a younger son of Ernest II, Count of Lippe-Biesterfeld, regent (1897–1904) of the Principality of Lippe, and his wife, Countess Karoline von Wartensleben. The marriage was at first considered morganatic, as Armgard's family didn't belong to one of the reigning or former reigning families. Thus, she was created "Countess of Biesterfeld" (German: Gräfin von Biesterfeld) on 8 February 1909.

They had two sons:

- Prince Bernhard of Lippe-Biesterfeld (29 June 1911 – 1 December 2004), married in 1937 to Juliana of the Netherlands, had issue.
- Prince Aschwin of Lippe-Biesterfeld (13 June 1914 – 14 May 1988), married in 1951 to Simone Arnoux, no issue.

On 24 February 1916, her marriage was declared equal and she was made "Princess of Lippe-Biesterfeld" (German: Prinzessin zur Lippe-Biesterfeld) along with the style Serene Highness by her brother-in-law, Leopold IV, Prince of Lippe, and this title was extended to her two sons in order to produce a new branch of the Lippe family.

== World War II ==
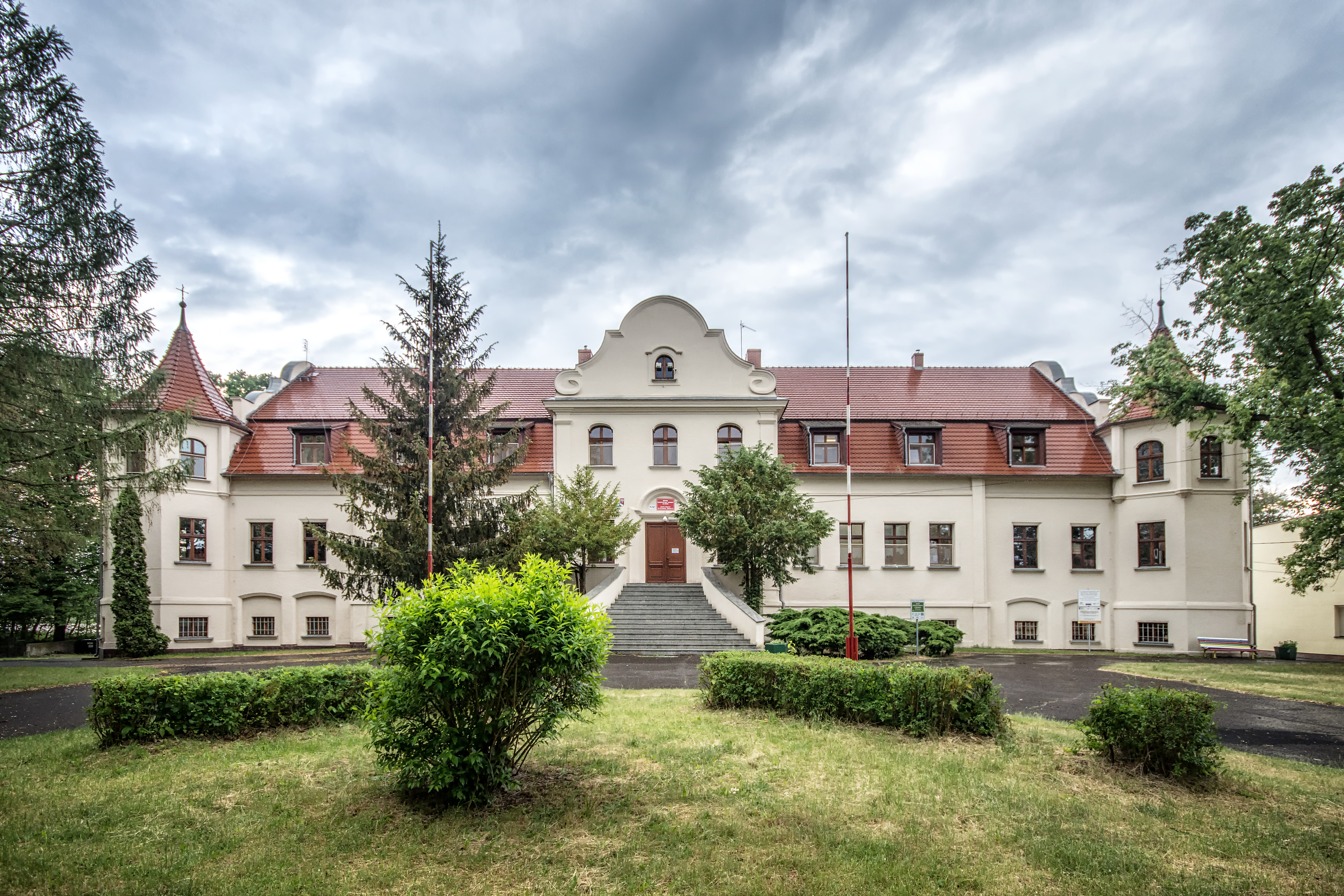
Reckenwalde palace, Armgard's residence in the Province of Brandenburg, today in Wojnowo, Lubusz Voivodeship, Poland (2022)

After the death of her husband in 1934, Armgard moved into Reckenwalde palace with her sons and managed an estate in Wojnowo, Lubusz Voivodeship, Province of Brandenburg (now Wojnowo, Poland), together with her new partner, Alexis Pantchoulidzew, an exiled Russian nobleman. Alexis accompanied Armgard to the wedding of Bernhard to Princess Juliana.

During World War II Armgard and Alexis were observed by the local Gestapo. Her apolitical past and the service that the monarchist and anti-Stalinist Colonel Pantchoulidzew later rendered in the war to the German Reich Railway, would have shielded her from Nazi authorities. The SS demanded in September 1944 in Recke, one of Armgard's properties, Schloss Woynowo Walde for military purposes. Armgard and Alexis gave an account of the withdrawal in 1945 of the Wehrmacht behind the Oder-line on their estate at Neumark.

Wim Klinkenberg and some other writers have accused Armgard of sexual promiscuity, intrigue, conspiracy, and – as with her son Aschwin – of Nazi sympathies. In March 2004, her son Bernhard tried to rectify this image with an open letter to The Times.

== Life in the Netherlands ==
She lived from early 1952 with her partner Alexis Pantchoulidzew in House Warmelo at Diepenheim. Alexis went on to be the Netherlands' sole representative at the 1956 Summer Olympics, competing in dressage. Alexis Pantchoulidzew died in 1968.

Armgard was a convert to Roman Catholicism like her granddaughter Princess Irene, but decided against attending Irene's controversial wedding to Carlos Hugo, Duke of Parma, which neither the Dutch royal family nor any Dutch diplomatic representative attended. The family nevertheless gathered at Armgard's home for the television coverage of the wedding.

== Death ==
Armgard died on 27 April 1971 in House Warmelo in Diepenheim, at the age of 87.

== Ancestry ==
Ancestors of Armgard von Cramm

16. Baron Levin von Cramm
8. Baron Friedrich von Cramm
17. Charlotte Louise von Wrede
4. Baron Adolf von Cramm
18. Wolf von Uetterodt
9. Charlotte Sophie von Uetterodt
19. Friederike von Rabe von Pappenheim
2. Baron Aschwin von Sierstopff-Cramm
20. Baron August Friedrich von Cramm
10. Baron Philipp Lebrecht von Cramm
21. Rebekka Ehlers
5. Baroness Hedwig von Cramm
22. Ernst von Griesheim
11. Philippine von Griesheim
23. Luise von Cornberg
1. Armgard von Sierstorpff-Cramm
24. Baron Peter von Sierstorpff
12. Count Heinrich von Sierstorpff-Driburg
25. Baroness Hedwig von Spätgen
6. Count Ernst von Sierstorpff-Driburg
26. Ernst Idel Jobst Vincke
13. Charlotte Vincke
27. Sophie Louise von Buttlar-Elberberg
3. Baroness Hedwig of Sierstorpff-Driburg
28. Ernst Idel Jobst Vincke (= 26)
14. Baron Ludwig von Vincke
29. Sophie Louise von Buttlar-Elberberg (= 27)
7. Baroness Karoline von Vincke
30. Baron Friedrich von Syberg zum Busch
15. Baroness Eleonore von Syberg zum Busch
31. Wilhelmine von Bodelschwingh
