= Baron Aschwin von Sierstorpff-Cramm =

Baron Aschwin of Sierstorpff-Cramm
- Freiherr
- Full name: German: Aschwin Thedel Adalbert
- Born: 29 March 1846; Lohndorf, Kingdom of Bavaria
- Died: 14 October 1909 (aged 63); Reckenwalde, Kingdom of Prussia
- Noble family: Cramm
- Spouses: Baroness Hedwig of Sierstorpff-Driburg (m. 1872; died 1900)
- Issue: Hedwig, Countess Wilhelm of Oeynhausen-Sierstorpff; Baroness Wanda, Mrs. von Krieger; Baroness Erika, Mrs. von der Marwitz; Armgard, Princess Bernhard of Lippe-Biesterfeld
- Father: Adolf of Cramm
- Mother: Hedwig of Cramm

Baron Aschwin of Sierstorpff-Cramm (German: Freiherr Aschwin von Sierstorpff-Cramm; 29 March 1846 – 14 October 1909) was a German nobleman who was the chamberlain of the Duchy of Brunswick.

== Early life ==
Aschwin of Cramm was born at the village of Lohndorf in the Kingdom of Bavaria, German Empire, as the third child and first son of Adolf of Cramm (1812–1879), and his wife, Hedwig of Cramm (1819–1891).

== Marriage ==
Aschwin married on 24 September 1872 at Bad Driburg to Baroness Hedwig of Sierstorpff-Driburg (1848–1900), member of a Prussian noble family. She was daughter of Count Ernst of Sierstorpff-Driburg (1813-1855) and his wife, Baroness Karoline of Vincke (1822-1870).

They had four daughters:

- Hedwig (10 January 1874 – 21 January 1907), married in 1896 to Count Wilhelm of Oeynhausen-Sierstorpff, had issue.
- Wanda (9 August 1879 – 1960), married in 1900 to Max von Krieger, had issue.
- Erika (1880–1915), married to Caspar von der Marwitz, had issue.
- Armgard (18 December 1883 – 27 April 1971), married in 1905 to Count Bodo of Oeynhausen, divorced in 1908, no issue; Married secondly in 1909 to Prince Bernhard of Lippe-Biesterfeld, had issue (including Bernhard, Prince Consort of the Netherlands).

In 1881, Aschwin added the last name of his wife (Sierstorpff) to his own, since his father-in-law was the last male surviving heir of the Sierstorpff family name and estate.

== Career ==
Aschwin was hereditary chamberlain of the Duke of Brunswick. Later he served as Master of the Horse where he met with the Sultan of the Ottoman Empire. He settled on his estate of Reckenwalde, Province of Brandenburg (now Wojnowo, Poland).

== Ancestry ==
Ancestors of Baron Aschwin von Sierstorpff-Cramm

8. Levin of Cramm
4. Friedrich of Cramm
9. Charlotte Louise von Wrede
2. Adolf of Cramm
10. Wolf von Uetterodt
5. Charlotte Sophie von Uetterodt
11. Friederike Rabe von Pappenheim
1. Baron Aschwin of Sierstorpff-Cramm
12. August Friedrich of Cramm
6. Philipp Lebrecht of Cramm
13. Rebekka Ehlers
3. Hedwig of Cramm
14. Ernst von Griesheim
7. Philippine von Griesheim
15. Luise von Cornberg

== Notes and sources ==
- Genealogisches Handbuch des Adels, Fürstliche Häuser, Reference: 1964 548
