= Alexis Pantchoulidzew =

Russian-Dutch nobleman and equestrian

Prince Bernard (left) with Pantchoulidzew

Alexis "Tschuli" Pantchoulidzew (Russian: Алексей Панчулидзев; 18 September 1888, Pyatigorsk, Russia – 10 April 1968, Diepenheim, the Netherlands) was a Russian-Dutch nobleman and equestrian. He was a long-term unmarried partner of German Princess Armgard of Sierstorpff-Cramm, the mother of Prince Bernhard of Lippe-Biesterfeld, who in turn was the husband of Juliana, Queen of the Netherlands. At 67 years old, Pantchoulidzew was the only equestrian competitor for the Netherlands at the Dutch-boycotted 1956 Summer Olympics. He was the oldest participant at the games, and as of 2013 he still held the record for the oldest Dutch participant in Olympics. (Note: Translated quote: "Pantchoulidzew did not do well [in 1956], partly because he had the misfortune of starting first, and ended up in a disappointing 28th place. "It could have been better," he said in an initial reaction. Nevertheless, this athlete still [2013] holds the record as the oldest Dutch participant ever to take part in the Olympic Games. The day he took action, he was exactly 67 years and 270 days old.")

== Biography ==
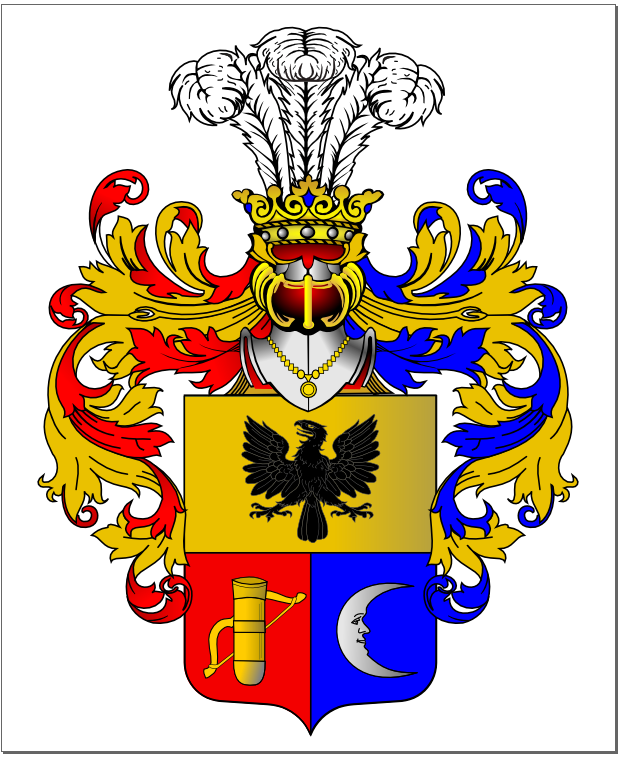
Coat of arms of the Pantchoulidzew family

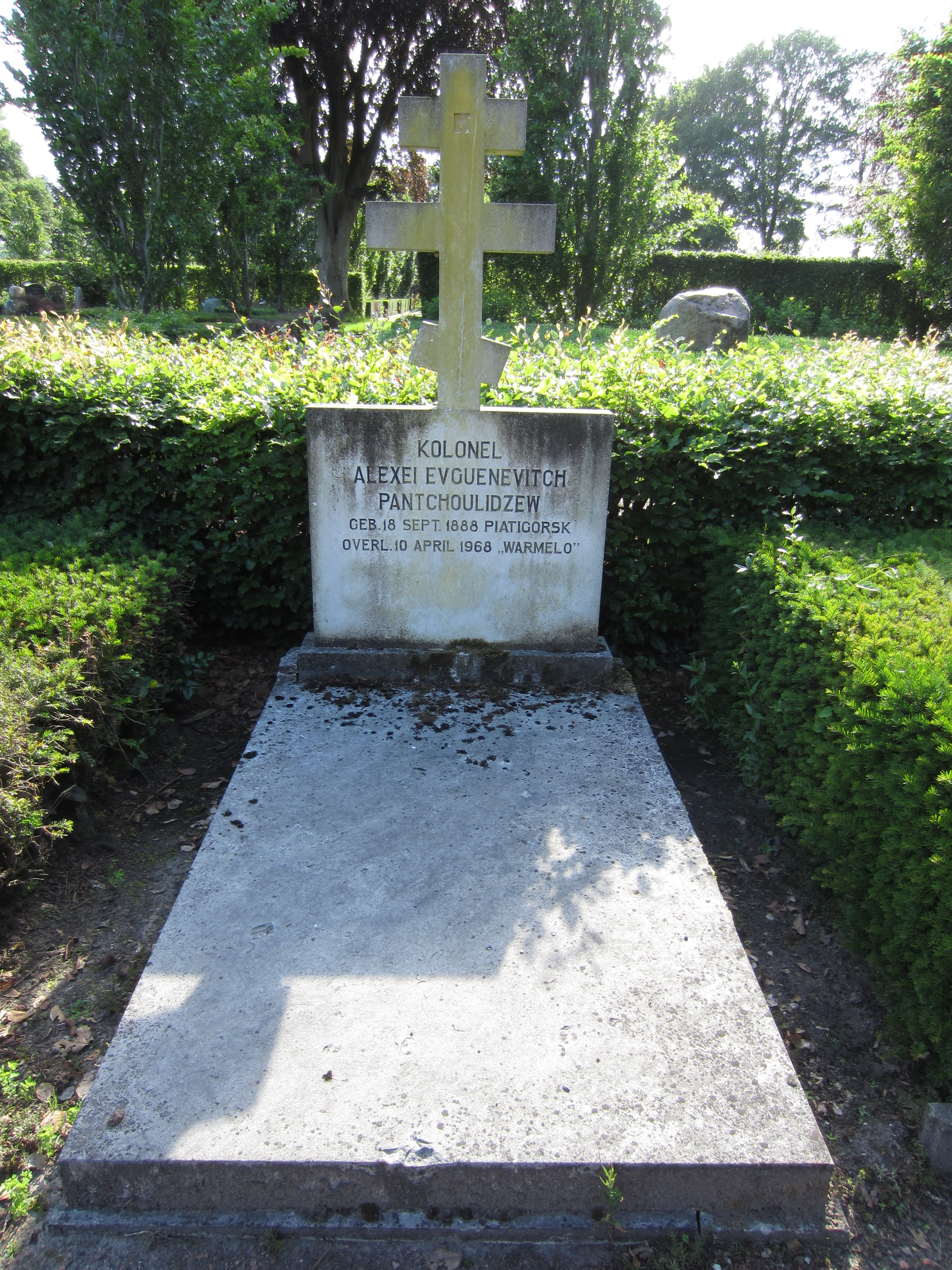
The grave of Pantchoulidzew in Diepenheim

Pantchoulidzew was born into the noble Russian-Georgian Pantchoulidzew family, in Pyatigorsk, a town close to Georgia where he served with the cavalry. After the revolution of 1917 he fled Russia and eventually settled in Germany. There he became a Stable Master of Princess Armgard of Sierstorpff-Cramm and a mentor to her son before he became prince-consort of the Netherlands, with all three sharing a lifelong passion for horse riding. Bernhard learned riding from Pantchoulidzew, and together they took part in international competitions. After the death of her husband Prince Bernhard of Lippe in 1934, Pantchoulidzew became a long-term partner of Princess Armgard and settled with her in Germany. Throughout the Third Reich era, both he and Armgard's second son, Aschwin, who actively backed the Nazi regime, had ended up being employed by the government and all three had relocated to Berlin by the time World War II had been taking place.

After the end of the war, prince Bernhard pleaded for the Vatican to help bring Armgard and Pantchoulidzew to move to the Netherlands. After emigration and naturalisation, Pantchoulidzev dedicated himself to developing and improving the level of Dutch equestrian sports in international stage. He was eventually appointed by the FEI, the international governing body of horse sports in Switzerland, as an official member of the jury d'appel for the showjumping competition at the 1956 Olympic Games in Stockholm.

=== 1956 Olympics ===
After World War II, prince-consort Bernhard became a patron to Pantchoulidzew. Being a Dutch prince and president of the International Federation for Equestrian Sports (since 1954), he arranged that Pantchoulidzew received Dutch citizenship and was the only Dutch competitor at the 1956 Stockholm Equestrian Games.

The Netherlands boycotted the 1956 Summer Olympics in Melbourne, Australia, because of the Soviet Union's invasion of Hungary. However, the strict Australian quarantine regulations resulted in the Olympic equestrian events being held in Stockholm, Sweden, five months earlier, and, with the help of Bernhard, Pantchoulidzew was allowed to participate at his own expense. He took part in the individual Grand Prix dressage with the horse Lascar that belonged to Prince Bernhard. He finished in 28th place among 36 participants, in presence of the Dutch Prince and his mother, Princess Armgard of Lippe-Biesterfeld. To his disadvantage, he had to start first, and thus could not adjust his performance to competitors.
