= Netherlands at the 1956 Summer Olympics =

- Flag of the Netherlands
- IOC code: NED
- NOC: Dutch Olympic Committee

in Melbourne/Stockholm
- Competitors: 1 in 1 sport
- Medals: Gold 0 Silver 0 Bronze 0 Total 0

Summer Olympics appearances (overview)
- 1900; 1904; 1908; 1912; 1920; 1924; 1928; 1932; 1936; 1948; 1952; 1956; 1960; 1964; 1968; 1972; 1976; 1980; 1984; 1988; 1992; 1996; 2000; 2004; 2008; 2012; 2016; 2020; 2024

Other related appearances
- 1906 Intercalated Games

The Netherlands boycotted the 1956 Summer Olympics in Melbourne, Australia because of the participation of the Soviet Union, who invaded Hungary during the Hungarian Revolution of 1956. However, the equestrian events for the 1956 Games were held in Stockholm, Sweden five months earlier (because of Australian quarantine regulations), and one Dutch rider competed.

== Equestrian ==
=== Dressage ===
Athlete	Horse	Event	Judges scores		Overall	
Athlete	Horse	Event	Score	Rank	Overall score	Rank
Alexis Pantchoulidzew	Lascar	Individual	116.5	29	586.50	28
