= Prince Aschwin of Lippe-Biesterfeld =

German prince (1914–1988)

Prince Aschwin
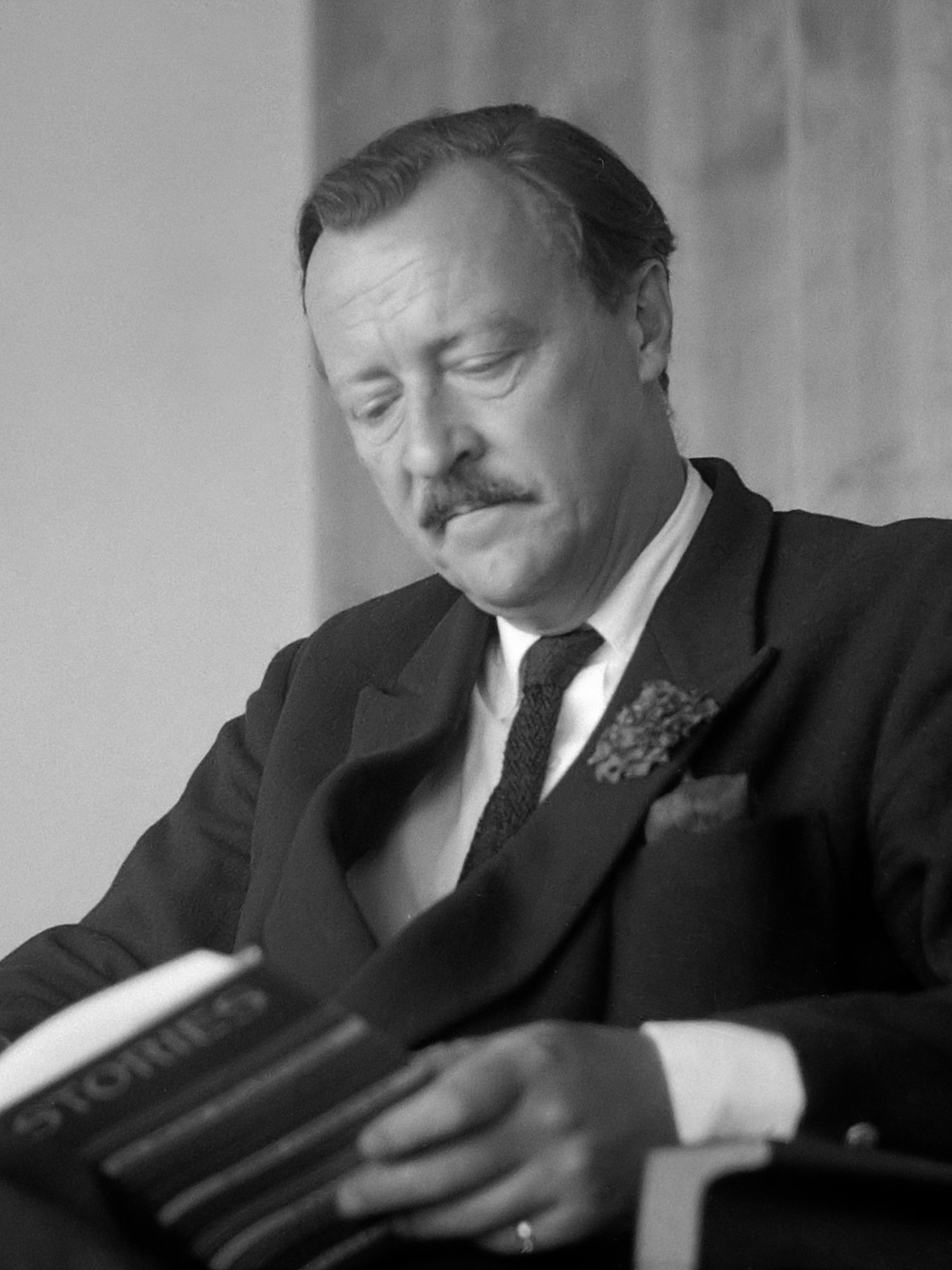
- Aschwin of Lippe-Biesterfeld in 1961
- Born: 13 June 1914; Jena, Saxe-Weimar-Eisenach, German Empire
- Died: 14 May 1988 (aged 73); The Hague, the Netherlands
- Burial: Oud Eik en Duinen, The Hague
- Spouse: Simone Arnoux (m. 1951)
Names
- Ernst Aschwin Georg Carol Heinrich Ignatz Prinz zur Lippe-Biesterfeld
- House: Lippe
- Father: Prince Bernhard of Lippe
- Mother: Armgard of Sierstorpff-Cramm

Prince Aschwin of Lippe-Biesterfeld (13 June 1914 – 14 May 1988) was an expert in Chinese painting and Indian sculpture and curator at the Metropolitan Museum of Art in New York. He was the younger brother of Prince Bernhard of Lippe-Biesterfeld.

== Life and career ==
Aschwin was the second and last child of Prince Bernhard of Lippe and Baroness Armgard of Sierstorpff-Cramm. He was born with the title of count of Biesterfeld and grew up with his elder brother Bernhard at their parents' estate, Castle Reckenwalde (now Wojnowo, Lubusz Voivodeship, Poland). When Adolf Hitler came to power, Aschwin openly supported the Nazis and became a Wehrmacht officer. During the war, Aschwin continued his education in East Asian art. In November 1942, he defended a PhD at the Humboldt University of Berlin on the 13th century Chinese painting Bamboos and Rock by Li Kan, and then worked at the Department of Chinese paintings of the Museum of East Asian Art in Cologne.

In 1945, he left Germany, and in 1949 settled in New York as a research assistant at the Department of Far East of the Metropolitan Museum of Art, where he worked until retirement in 1973. During those years, he regularly published journal articles on Chinese paintings and Buddhist sculptures from South and Southeast Asia.

On 11 September 1951, Prince Aschwin married Simone Arnoux (1915-2001) in London. Arnoux was French and the daughter of Henri Arnoux, a naval officer and Chevalier (Knight) of the Legion of Honour. She was previously married to German aristocrat Gottfried Adam Vollrat von Watzdorf, from whom she had two children (Stephan von Watzdorf, born 1942, and Thilo von Watzdorf, born 1944), but none with Prince Aschwin. After the birth of Prince Constantijn of the Netherlands on 11 October 1969, Prince Aschwin became one of his godfathers.

Although Bernhard cut off communications with Nazi supporters, including his brother, their relationships resumed after the war. In the 1970s, Bernhard persuaded Aschwin, who was suffering from Parkinson's disease, to return to the Netherlands, where he died in 1988, aged 73.

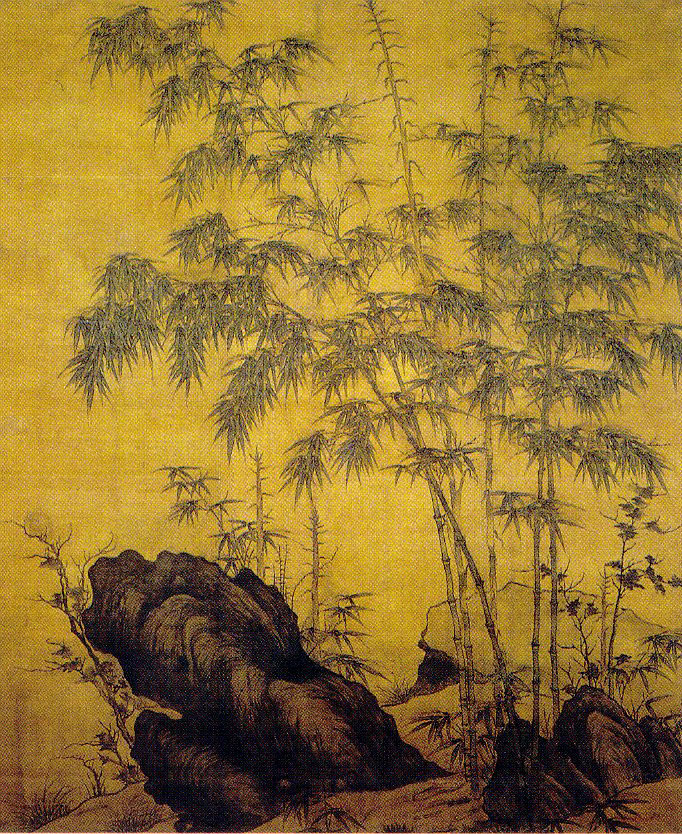
Bamboos and Rocks by Li Kan, the subject of PhD thesis of Prince Aschwin

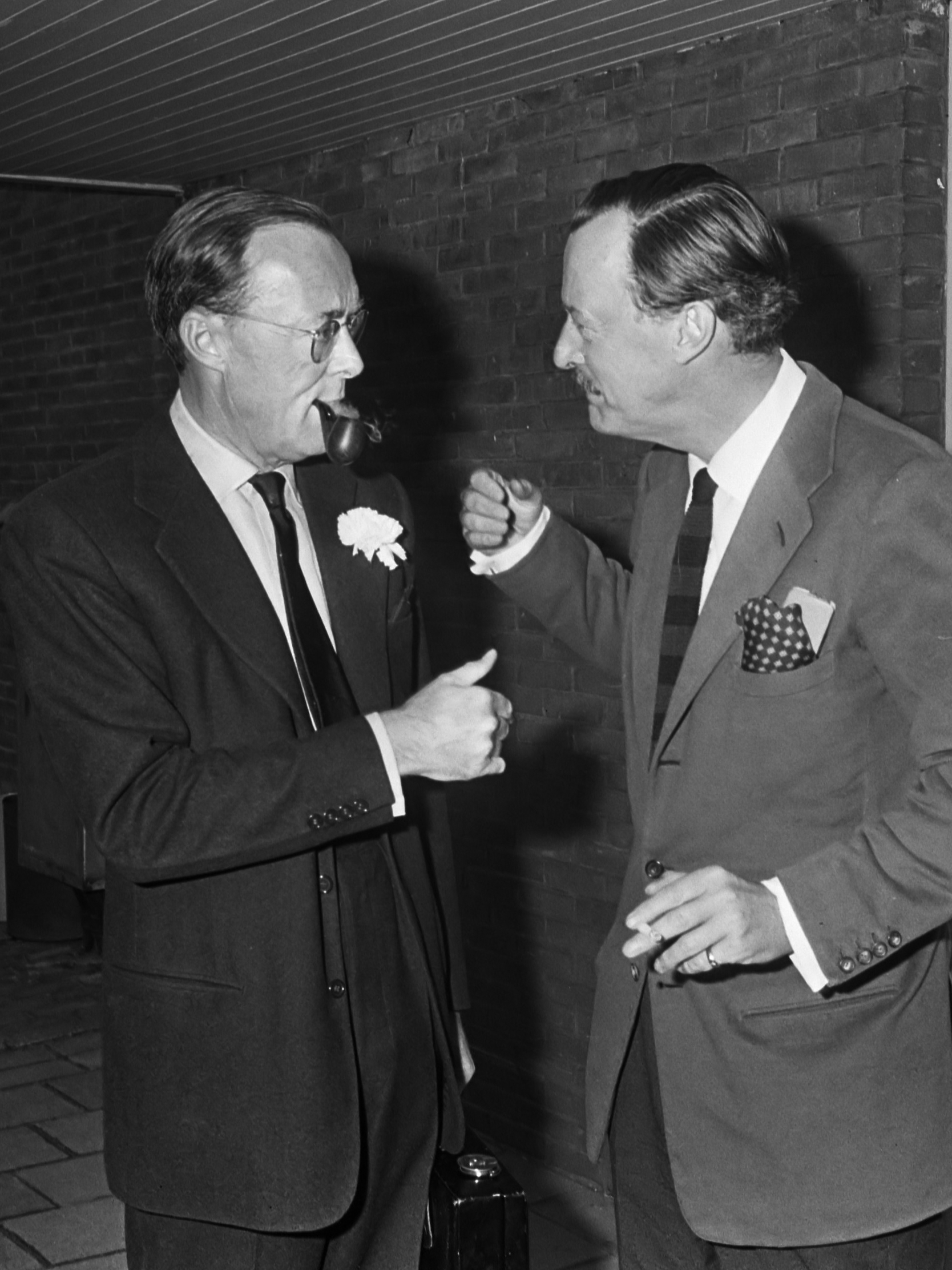
Bernhard and Aschwin in 1966

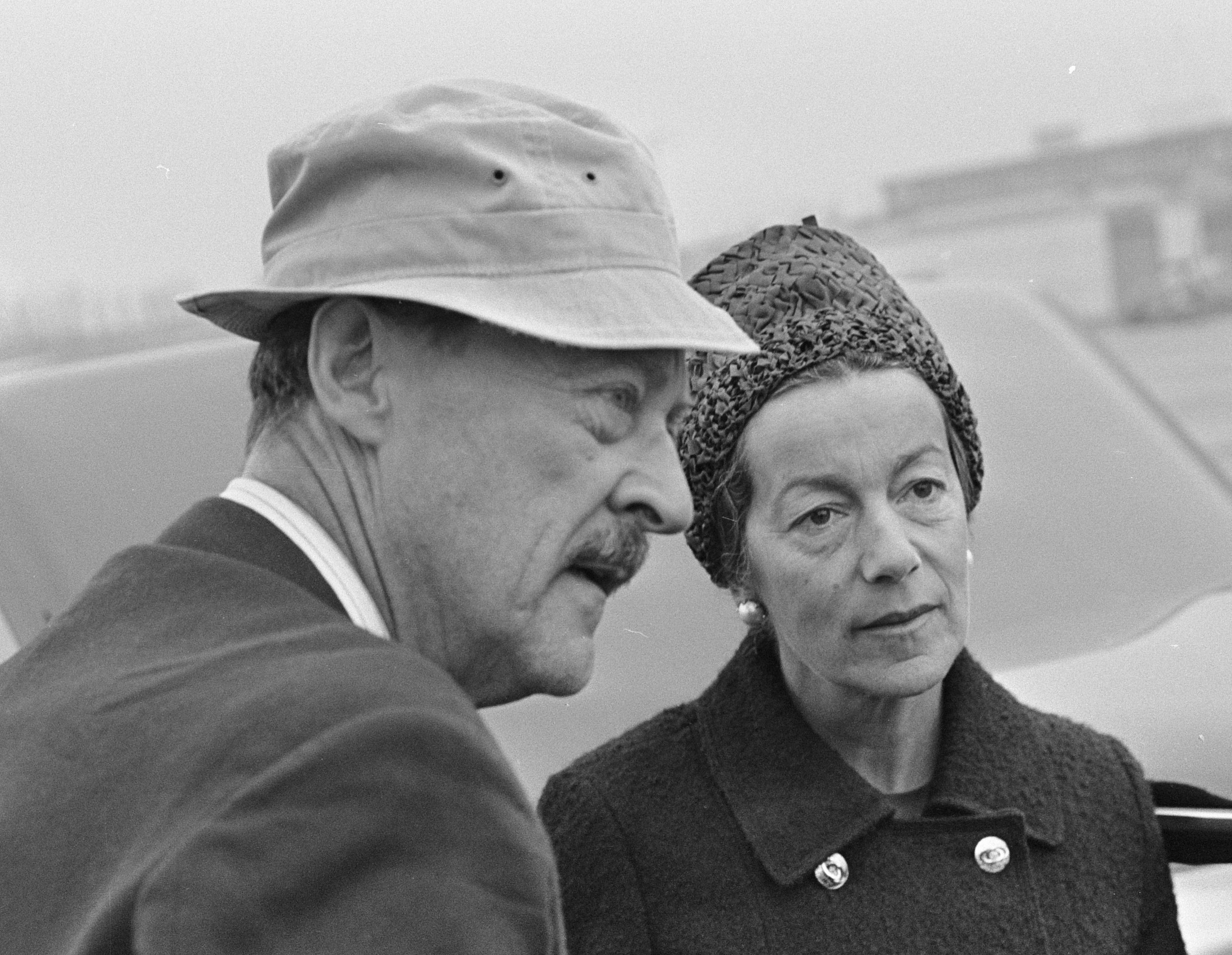
Prince Aschwin and Simone Arnoux in 1966

== Main publications ==
- Fong Chow; Aschwin Lippe (1965). Chinese Buddhist Sculpture. Metropolitan museum of art.
- Aschwin Lippe (1970). The Freer Indian Sculptures. Smithsonian Institution.
- Aschwin Lippe (1978). Indian Mediaeval Sculpture. North-Holland Publishing Company. ISBN 978-0-444-85086-7.
