= Cramm =

German noble family

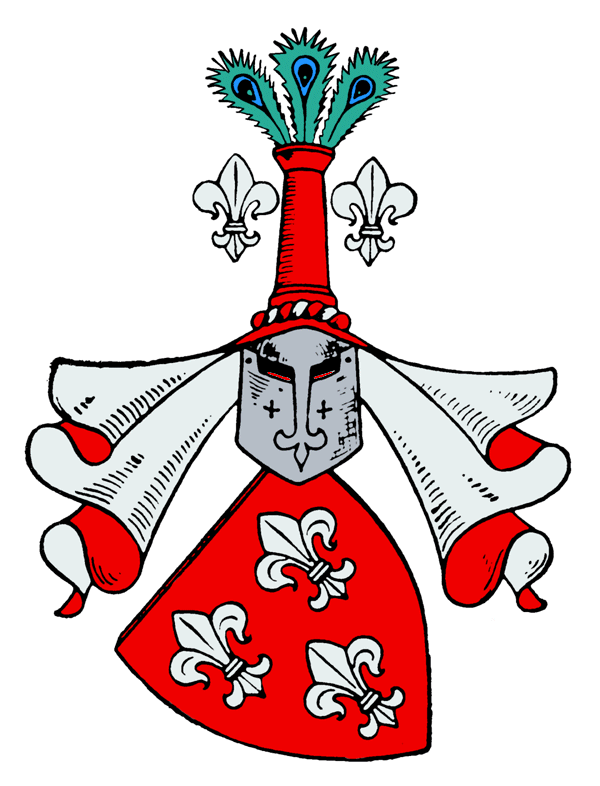
Coat of arms

The von Cramm family (originally also von Kram, von Cramme or von Crammen) is a prominent German noble family of the Uradel and one of the oldest noble houses of Lower Saxony.

== History ==
According to a source from 1774, the family came to the area of the bishopric of Hildesheim around 815 with the Carolingian Emperor Louis I and was granted estates there by him. However, the family is first verifiably documented in 1150 with Dietrich von Cramme. The Cramms were a wealthy knightly family and respected feudatories of the ecclesiastical and secular rulers of the region. From a very early start in their history, the family held high positions at their respective courts. From 1250 on they were the hereditary chamberlains of the Duchy of Brunswick-Lüneburg and from 1294 to 1589 the hereditary cup-bearers of the Prince-Bishopric of Hildesheim. In later centuries family members served the House of Welf as generals, chamberlains and ministers. They held the title of Freiherr (Baron) and owned multiple estates of which the castles of Bodenburg, Brüggen and Oelber are still in their possession.

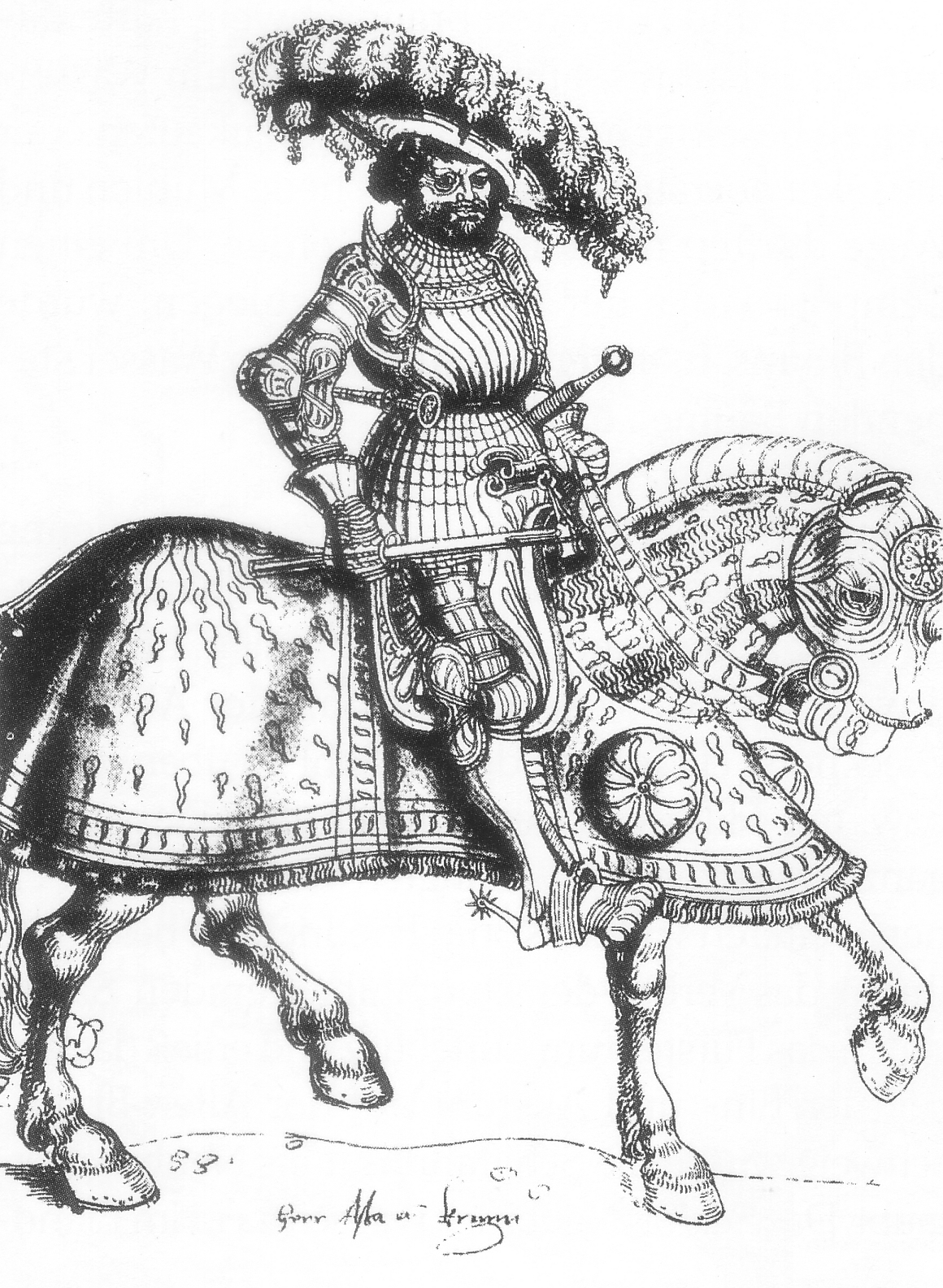
Asche von Cramm, drawn by Lucas Cranach the Elder

== Notable members of the family ==
- Armgard von Cramm (1883–1971), Mother of Prince Bernhard of Lippe-Biesterfeld and grandmother of Beatrix of the Netherlands
- Asche von Cramm (also Aschwin IV., Ascanius, Assa von Cramm; approx. 1480–1528), famous warrior and military leader of the Reformation period, field marshal to Prince-elector John of Saxony and friend of Martin Luther. At his suggestion, Luther wrote "Ob Kriegsleute auch in seligem Stande sein können" (Whether Soldiers, Too, Can Be Saved), which appeared in 1526. He gained special fame for his bravery in battle, but also for his good nature and piety.
- Aschwin von Sierstorpff-Cramm (1846-1909), Hereditary chamberlain of the Duke of Brunswick. Later he served as Master of the Horse for the Sultan of the Ottoman Empire and received the title of Pasha.
- Gottfried von Cramm (1909–1976), German tennis champion who won the French Open twice and reached the final of a Grand Slam in five other occasions. He was ranked number 2 in the world in 1934 and 1936, and number 1 in the world in 1937. His refusal to work with the Nazi regime got him briefly jailed in 1938.
- Helga von Cramm (1840–1919), German and Swiss painter, illustrator and graphic artist.
- Ludolf von Cramme (documented in 1246), first hereditary chamberlain of the Duchy of Brunswick
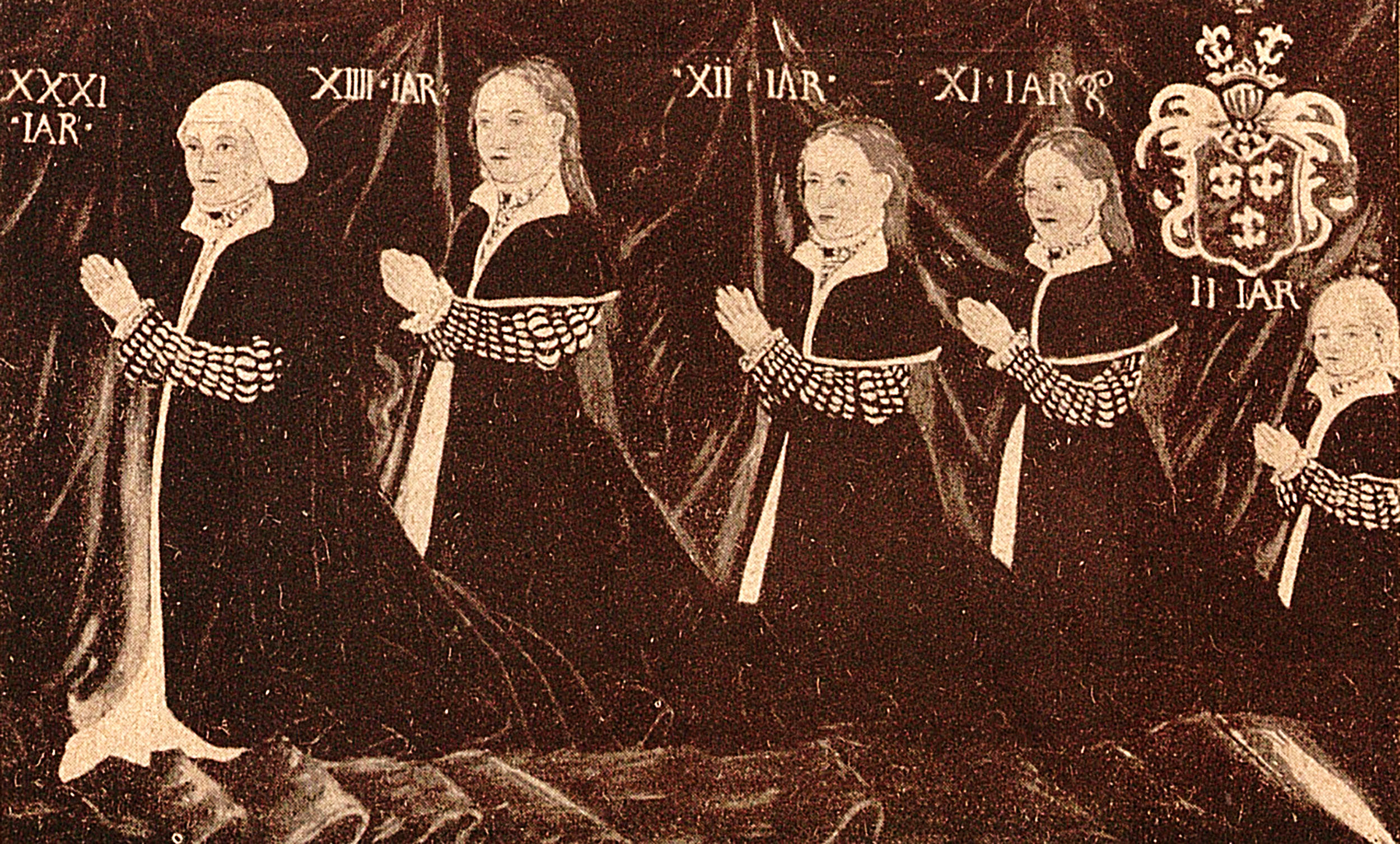
Klara von Cramm (⚭ Johann VIII von der Asseburg) with her daughters, 16th century

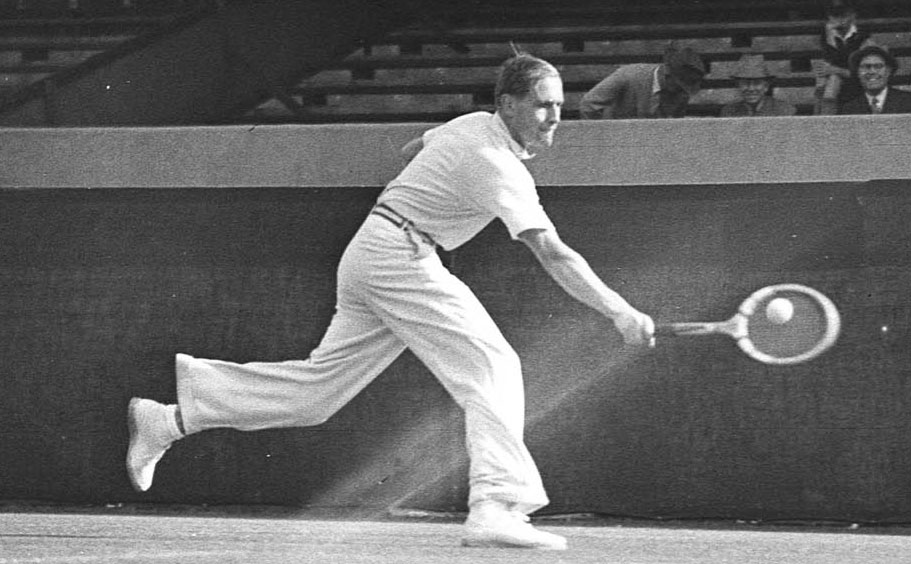
Gottfried von Cramm during the Australian Championships 1937

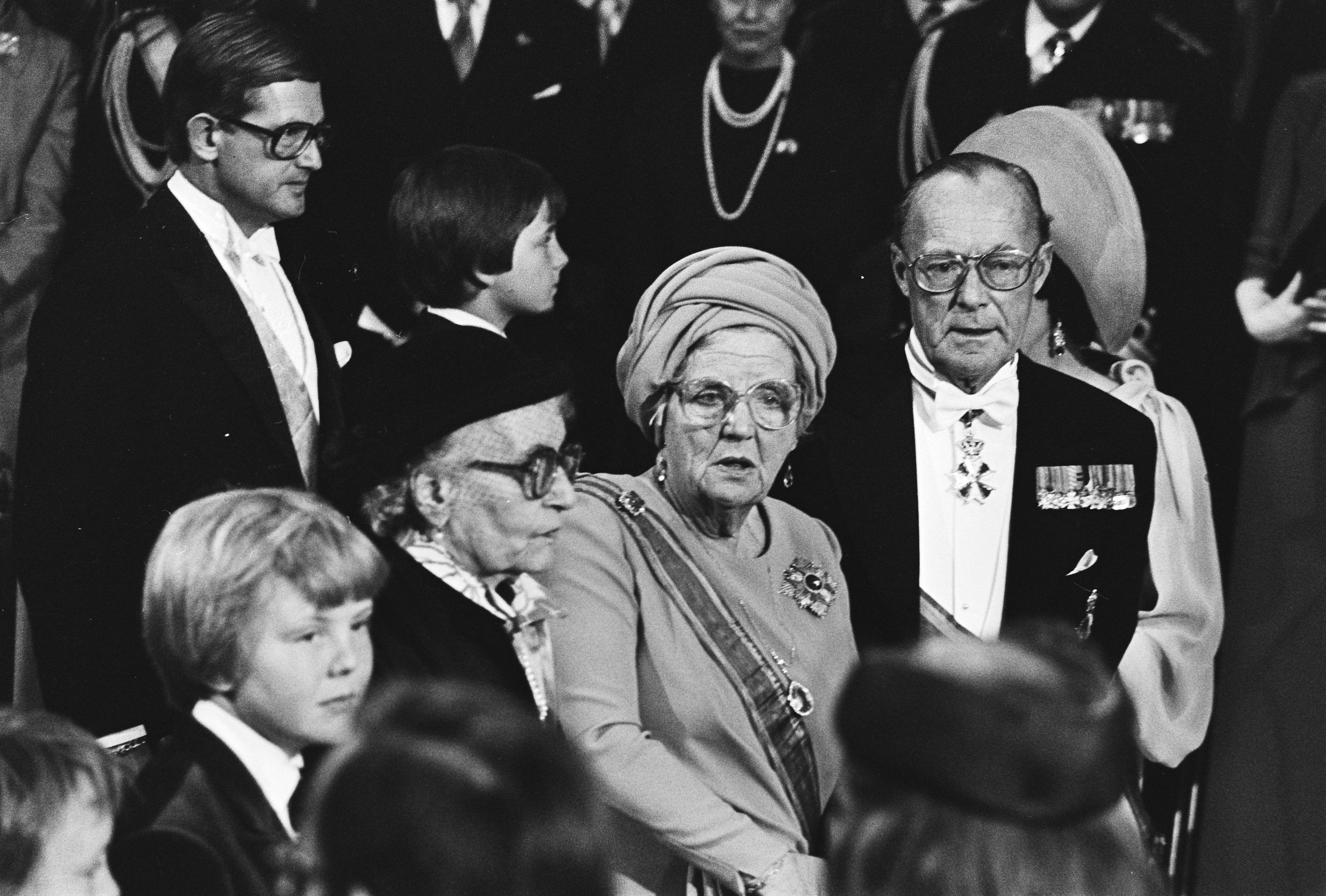
Armgard von Cramm (2nd from the left) together with her daughter-in-law Queen Juliana of the Netherlands, her son Prince Bernhard and her great-grandson Prince Willem-Alexander.

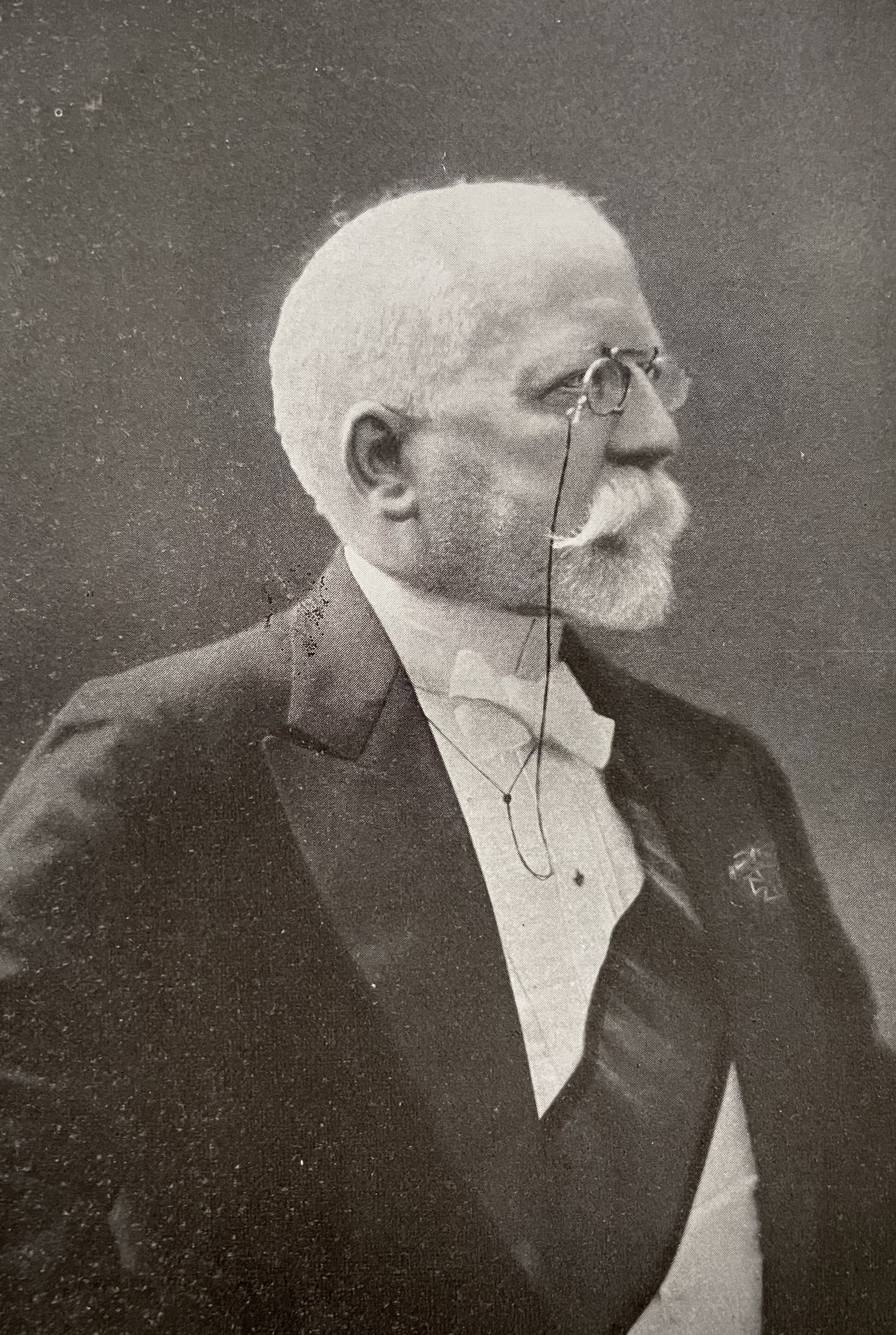
Burghard von Cramm (1837-1913), privy councilor and envoy to the Duke of Brunswick-Lüneburg

== Estates ==
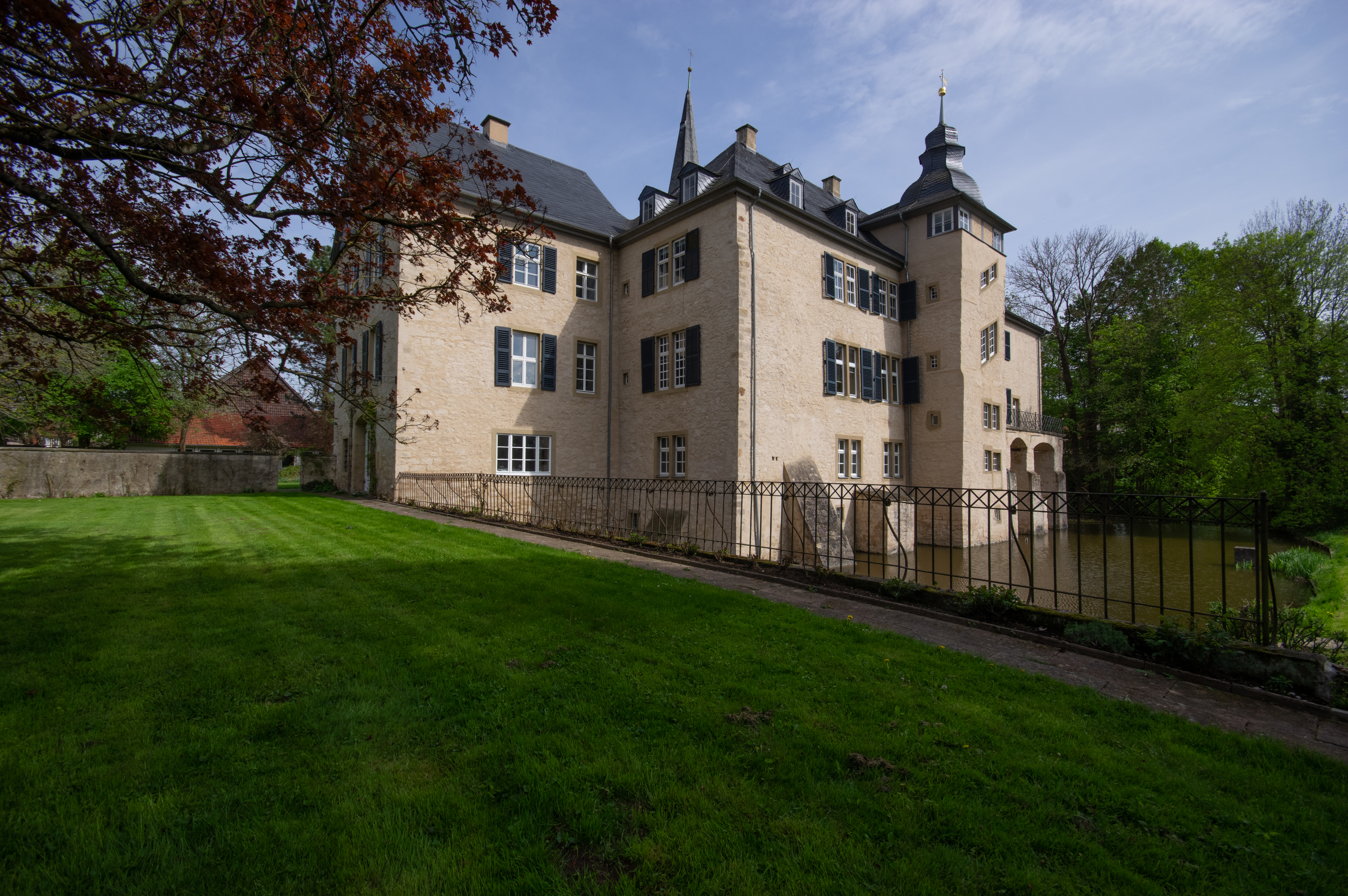
Bodenburg Castle

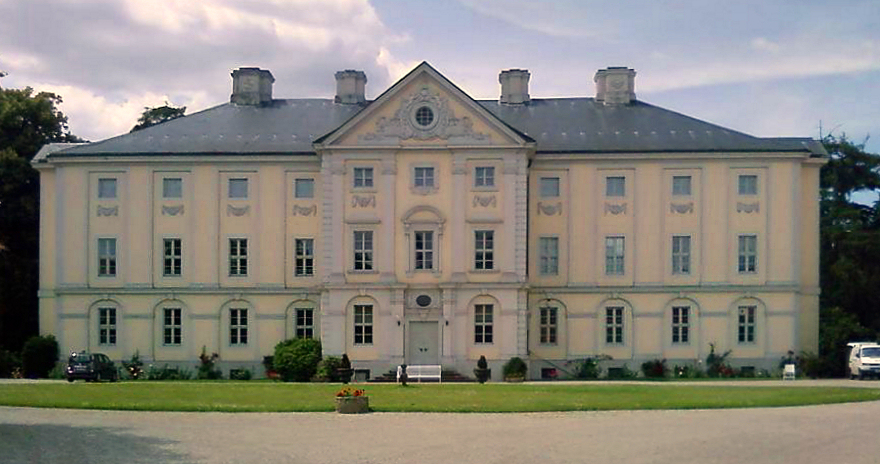
Brüggen Castle

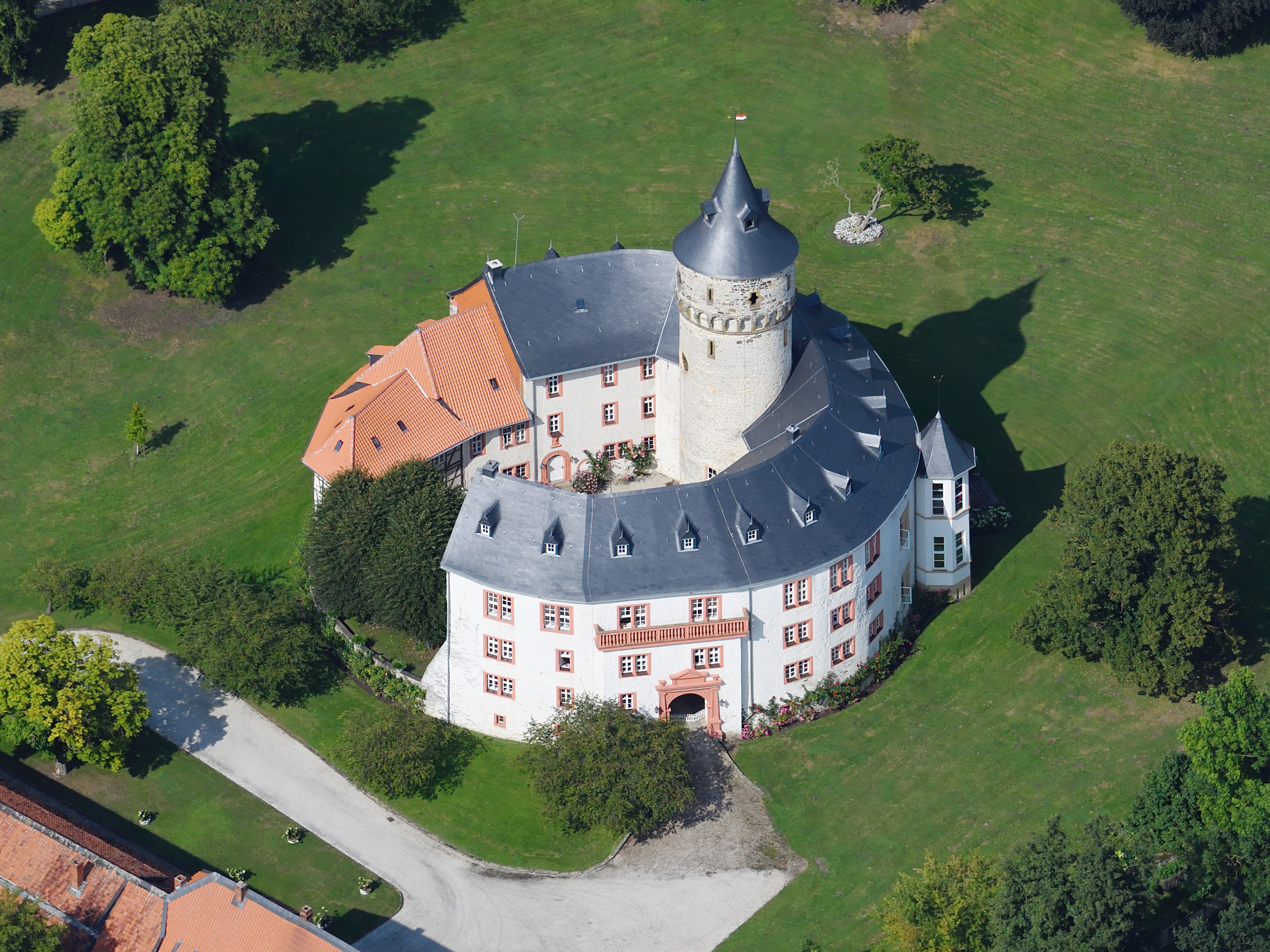
Oelber Castle, ancestral seat of the family since 1296
