= Prince Bernhard of Lippe-Biesterfeld =

Prince consort of the Netherlands from 1948 to 1980

Bernhard of Lippe-Biesterfeld
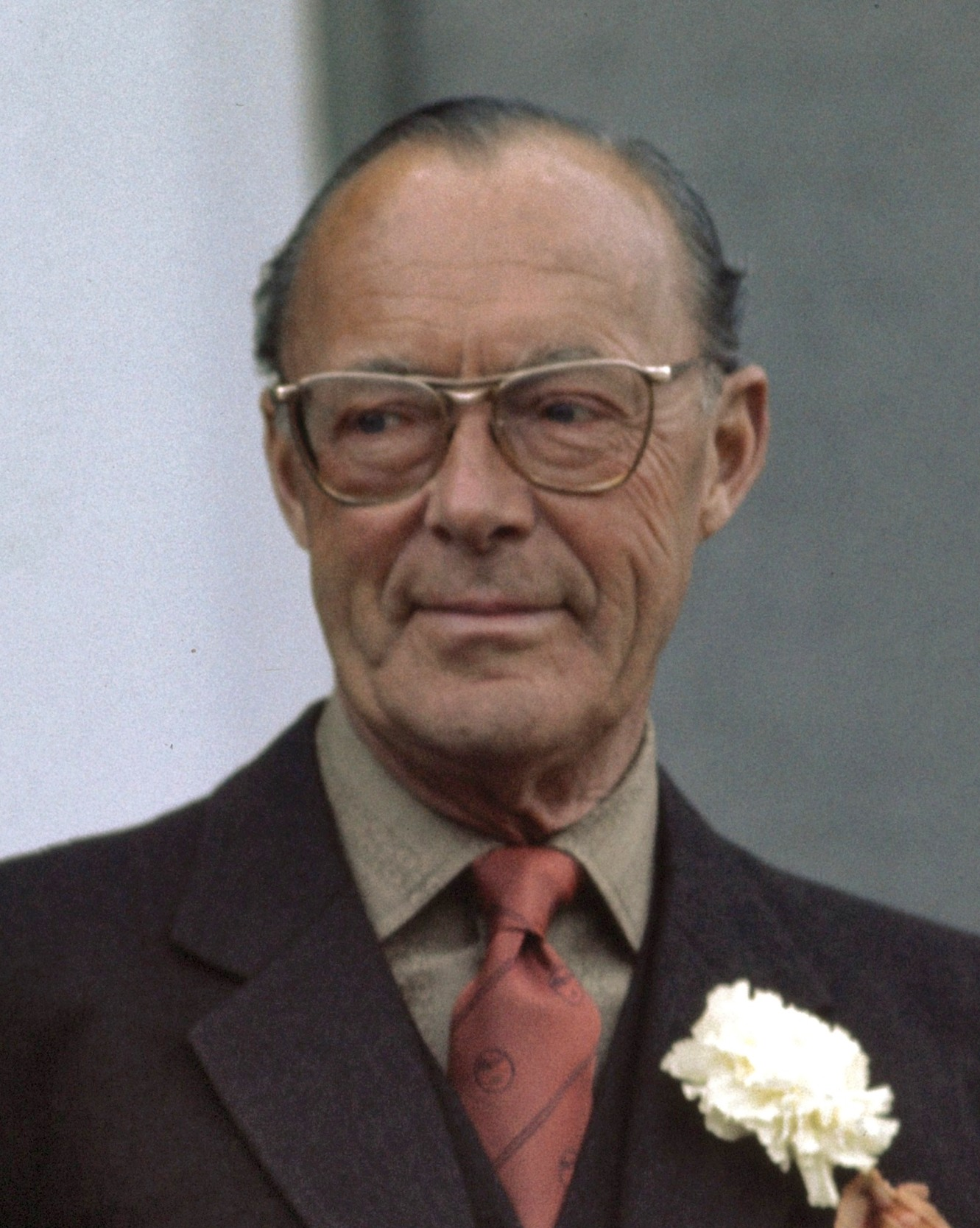
- Bernhard in 1976

Prince consort of the Netherlands
- Tenure: 6 September 1948 – 30 April 1980
- Born: Count Bernhard of Biesterfeld; 29 June 1911; Jena, Saxe-Weimar-Eisenach, German Empire
- Died: 1 December 2004 (aged 93); University Medical Center Utrecht, Utrecht, Kingdom of the Netherlands
- Burial: 11 December 2004; Nieuwe Kerk, Delft, Netherlands
- Spouse: Juliana of the Netherlands; (m. 1937; died 2004)
- Issue Detail: Beatrix of the Netherlands; Princess Irene; Princess Margriet; Princess Christina
Names
- German: Bernhard Leopold Friedrich Eberhard Julius Kurt Karl Gottfried Peter Prinz zur Lippe-Biesterfeld; Dutch: Bernhard Leopold Frederik Everhard Julius Coert Karel Godfried Pieter, Prins van Lippe-Biesterfeld
- House: Lippe-Biesterfeld
- Father: Prince Bernhard of Lippe
- Mother: Baroness Armgard von Sierstorpff-Cramm
- Religion: Church of Lippe (1911–1937); Dutch Reformed Church (1937–2004)
- Occupation: Military officer, aviator, conservationist, nonprofit director
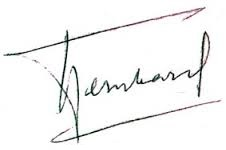
- Signature
- Political party: NSDAP (1933–1937)
- Prince Bernhard's voice Prince Bernhard (second voice heard in recording) as commander of the Domestic Forces speaks about the German capitulation (recorded 5 May 1945)

Prince Bernhard of Lippe-Biesterfeld (later Prince Bernhard of the Netherlands; 29 June 1911 – 1 December 2004) was Prince of the Netherlands from 6 September 1948 to 30 April 1980 as the husband of Queen Juliana. They had four daughters together, including Queen Beatrix of the Netherlands.

Bernhard belonged to the German princely House of Lippe-Biesterfeld and was a nephew of the last sovereign prince of Lippe, Leopold IV. From birth he held the title Count of Biesterfeld; his uncle raised him to princely rank with the style of Serene Highness in 1916. He studied law and worked as an executive secretary at the Paris office of IG Farben. In 1937 he married Princess Juliana of the Netherlands, and was immediately given the title Prince of the Netherlands with the style of Royal Highness. Upon his wife's accession to the throne in 1948, he became prince consort.

Bernhard was an early member of the Nazi Party (NSDAP) as well as the brown shirts or Sturmabteilung (SA), and served as an officer in the Schutzstaffel (SS). He switched his political allegiance to the Allies after the invasion of the Netherlands. Until his death, Bernhard denied being a NSDAP member or holding a NSDAP membership card. He was respected for his performance as a combat pilot and his activities as a liaison officer and personal aide to his mother-in-law, Queen Wilhelmina, during the conflict, and for his work during post-war reconstruction. During the war, he was part of the London-based Allied war planning council, and saw limited active combat service as honorary wing commander in Royal Air Force (RAF), flying both fighter and bomber planes. He was also an honorary general officer in the Dutch army and was an observer in negotiating the terms of surrender of Nazi forces in the Netherlands. Officially for proven bravery, leadership and loyalty during his wartime efforts, he was appointed a Commander of the Military William Order, the Netherlands' oldest and highest honour. After the war he was made honorary air marshal of the RAF by Queen Elizabeth II. In 1969, Bernhard was awarded the Grand Cross (Special Class) of the Order of Merit of the Federal Republic of Germany. He became entangled in the so-called Lockheed bribery scandal in 1976 for having secretly promoted the sale of their airplanes and of Northrop's for money, and was degraded from all his military functions with a lifelong ban on wearing any military uniform.

Bernhard helped found the World Wildlife Fund (WWF, later renamed World Wide Fund for Nature), becoming its first president in 1961. In 1970, along with Prince Philip, Duke of Edinburgh, and other associates, he established the WWF's financial endowment "The 1001: A Nature Trust". In 1954, he was a co-founder of the international Bilderberg Group, which has met annually since then to discuss corporate globalisation and other issues concerning Europe and North America. He was forced to step down from both groups after being involved in the Lockheed bribery scandal.

== Early life ==
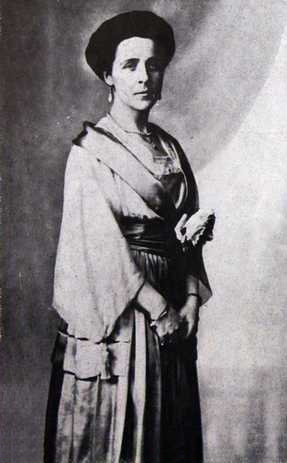
Bernhard's mother: Princess Armgard zur Lippe-Biesterfeld, née Baroness von Sierstorpff-Cramm (circa 1909)

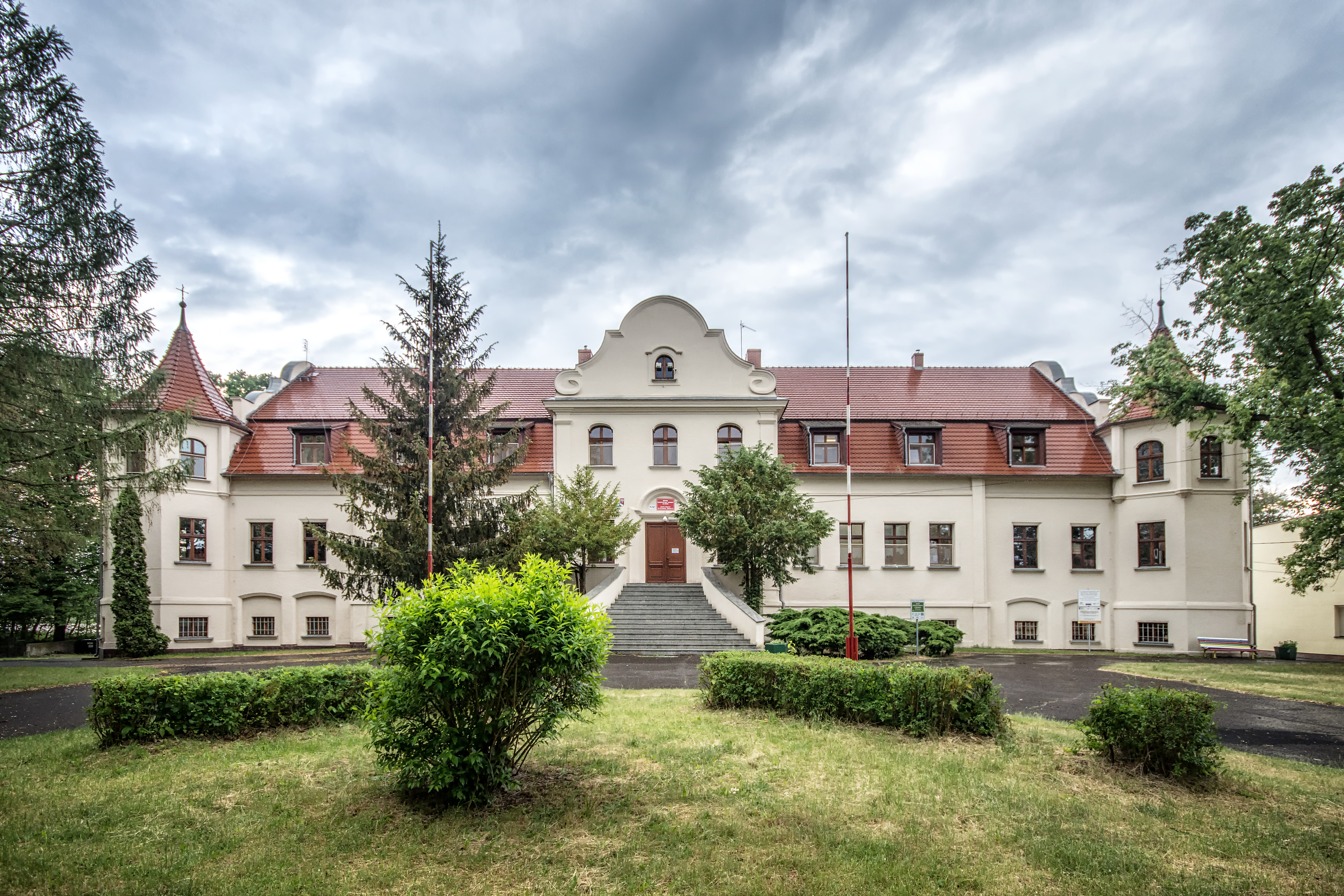
Reckenwalde palace, today Wojnowo in Poland, where Prince Bernhard spent his youth

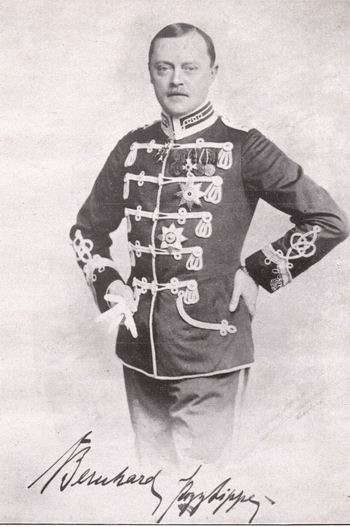
Bernhard's father: Prince Bernhard of Lippe (circa 1909)

Bernhard was born Bernhard Leopold Friedrich Eberhard Julius Kurt Karl Gottfried Peter, Count of Biesterfeld in Jena, Saxe-Weimar-Eisenach, German Empire on 29 June 1911, the elder son of Prince Bernhard of Lippe and his wife, Baroness Armgard von Sierstorpff-Cramm, member of one of the oldest Lower Saxon noble families, House of Cramm. He was a grandson of Ernest, Count of Lippe-Biesterfeld, who was regent of the Principality of Lippe until 1904, and was also a nephew of the principality's last sovereign, Leopold IV, Prince of Lippe.

Because his parents' marriage did not conform with the marriage laws of the House of Lippe, it was initially deemed morganatic, as Armgard did not belong by birth to any ruling or the former ruling families of Europe, Bernhard was granted only the title of Count of Biesterfeld at birth. He and his brother could succeed to the Lippian throne only if the entire reigning House became extinct. In 1916, his uncle Leopold IV as reigning Prince raised him and his mother to the rank of Prince and Princess of Lippe-Biesterfeld, thereby retroactively according his parents' marriage dynastic status. The suffix Biesterfeld revived the beginning of a new cadet line of the House of Lippe.

After World War I, Bernhard's family lost their German Principality and the revenue that had accompanied it, but the family was still reasonably well-off. Bernhard spent his early years at Reckenwalde palace (Wojnowo, Poland), the family's new estate in East Brandenburg, thirty kilometres east of the River Oder. He was taught privately and received his early education at home. When he was twelve, he was sent to board at the Gymnasium in Züllichau (Sulechów). Several years later he was sent to board at a Gymnasium in Berlin, from which he graduated in 1929.

Bernhard suffered from poor health as a boy. Doctors predicted that he would not live very long. This prediction might have inspired Bernhard's reckless driving and the risks that he took in the Second World War and thereafter. The prince wrecked several cars and planes in his lifetime.

Bernhard studied law at the University of Lausanne, Switzerland, in fall 1929 until the spring of 1930, then in Berlin, then in Munich the following year in the fall of 1931, and then again in Berlin. In Munich Bernhard enrolled himself on 24 October 1930. Van der Zijl also stresses the notoriety of the Ludwig-Maximilians-Universität München as extreme-right including sending away Albert Einstein as a lecturer in the twenties and the early ban of all Jewish societies. She characterizes of the city of Munich as the birthplace of the NSDAP. Back in Berlin at the Friedrich-Wilhelms-Universität in October 1931 after a serious illness, he could also indulge in his taste for fast cars, horse riding, and big-game hunting safaris. He was nearly killed in a boating accident and in an aeroplane crash. (He later suffered a broken neck and crushed ribs in a 160 km/h (100 mph) car crash after his marriage to princess Juliana in 1938). Bernhard was an active member of the Motor-SA and of the Deutsche Studentenschaft, where he inscribed himself on 27 April 1933.

While at university in Berlin for the year 1933, Bernhard joined the Nazi Party, exactly dated on his membership card as 1 May 1933. He also enrolled in the Sturmabteilung (SA), stating to his biographer Sefton Delmer that such a membership was necessary to register for exams – but Van der Zijl points out, that there were no official exams at this university until 1935.

Bernhard left Berlin in December 1934 when he graduated and went to work for IG Farben. The Prince later denied that he had belonged to SA, to the Reiter-SS (SS Cavalry Corps), and to the paramilitary National-sozialistisches Kraftfahrerkorps (NSKK), but these are well-documented memberships. According to journalist Philip Dröge, Bernhard was also a member of Nazi youth movement Sturm. While he was not a fierce champion of democracy, the Prince was never known to hold any radical political views or express any racist sentiments, although he admitted that he briefly had sympathised with Adolf Hitler's regime. van der Zijl clearly demonstrates, that Bernhard again and again fabulates on his memberships and other activities, to enhance his postwar stance that he never willingly would have joined any Nazi-organization. In October 2023, Bernhard's original NSDAP membership card was discovered in his old residence in Germany.

The Prince eventually went to work for the German chemical giant IG Farben in the early-to-mid 1930s, then the world's fourth-largest company. In 1932, it had already sponsored Hitler's election campaigns. (It survives today as BASF, AGFA, and Bayer). He joined the statistics department of IG Farben's N.W.7 wing, the company's main information gathering and management centre headquartered in Berlin and with offices worldwide (known as VOWI) that evolved into the economic intelligence arm of the Wehrmacht. He was lodged with Count Paul von Kotzebue (1884–1966), an exiled Russian nobleman of German descent, and his wife Allene Tew, who was born in the United States. After training, Bernhard became a secretary in 1935 to the board of directors at IG Farben's Paris office.

== Marriage and children ==
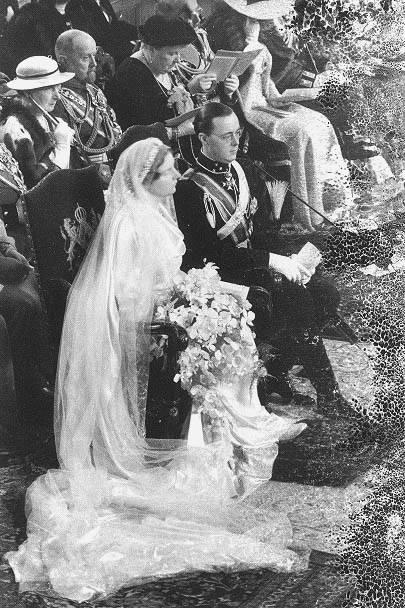
Princess Juliana and Prince Bernhard 1937 wedding

Bernhard met then-Princess Juliana at the 1936 Winter Olympics at Garmisch-Partenkirchen. Juliana's mother, Queen Wilhelmina, had spent most of the 1930s looking for a suitable husband for Juliana. As a Protestant of royal rank (the House of Lippe was a sovereign house in the German Empire), Bernhard was deemed acceptable for the devoutly religious Wilhelmina. They were distantly related, seventh cousins, both descending from Lebrecht, Prince of Anhalt-Zeitz-Hoym. Wilhelmina left nothing to chance, and had her lawyers draft a very detailed prenuptial agreement that specified exactly what Bernhard could and could not do. The couple's engagement was announced on 8 September 1936, and they were married at The Hague on 7 January 1937. Earlier, Bernhard had been granted Dutch citizenship and changed the spelling of his names from German to Dutch. Previously styled as Serene Highness, he became a Royal Highness by Dutch law. His appropriateness as consort of the future Queen would later become a matter of considerable public debate.

Prince Bernhard fathered six children, four of them with Queen Juliana. The eldest daughter is Beatrix, (born 1938), who later became Queen of the Netherlands. His other daughters with Juliana are Irene (born 1939), Margriet (born 1943) and Christina (1947–2019).

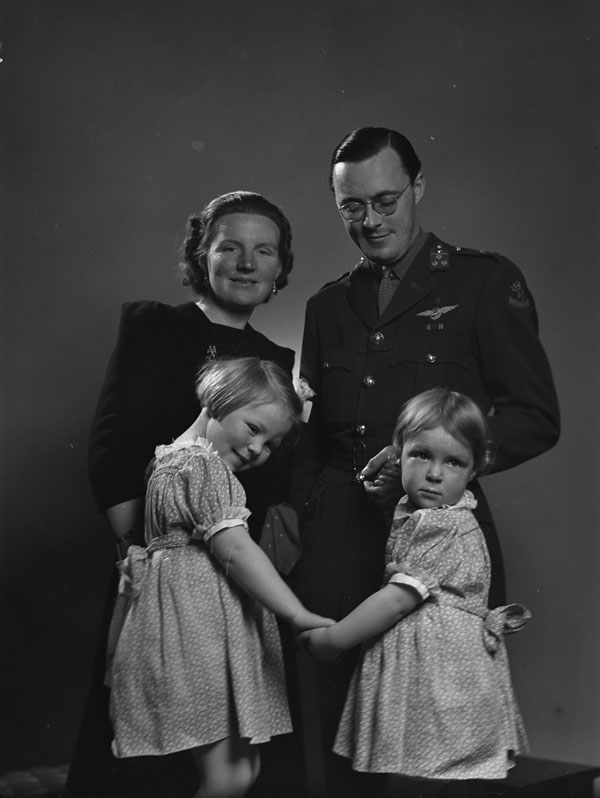
Princess Juliana and Prince Bernhard with their oldest daughters Princess Beatrix and Princess Irene in Ottawa on 4 May 1942.

He had two illegitimate daughters. The first is Alicia von Bielefeld (born in San Francisco on 21 June 1952), who became a landscape architect and lives in the United States. His sixth daughter, Alexia Grinda-Lejeune (born in Paris on 10 July 1967), is his child by Hélène Grinda, a French socialite and fashion model. Although rumours about these two children were already widespread, their status as his daughters was made official after his death. In December 2004, Dutch historian Cees Fasseur claimed that Jonathan Aitken, former British Conservative Cabinet Minister, is also a child of Prince Bernhard, the result of his wartime affair with Penelope Maffey.

== 1930s: Relationship with Nazi Party ==
Prince Bernhard was a member of the "Reiter-SS", a mounted unit of the SS, part of the National Socialist Motor Corps. Historian Flip Maarschalkerweerd discovered a NSDAP membership archive card that showed he had been a member of the NSDAP, also known as the Nazi Party from April 1933 to June 1934 and again from November 1934 until January 1937. His Nazi Party membership card was found in his belongings after his death. Bernhard denied being a paid or active member of the Nazi party throughout his life, although he did admit to being part of the movement as part of the Sturmabteilung; he claimed it was needed for him to be member of this organization as a student at the university. This was not the case as when Hitler became Chancellor of Germany on January 30, 1933, there was a run on party membership among opportunists. Between January and April 1933 the number of members of the party grew from around 850,000 to more than 2.5 million. Due to its inability to manage the influx, the party implemented a membership halt on May 1, 1933, which was only removed in 1937.

Bernhard stated to have severed all ties to the ruling Nazi regime in 1937 when he married princess Juliana of the Netherlands. In interviews he claimed his brother Aschwin was a real Nazi at the time, but that he was only Nazi on paper.

Various members of his family and friends were aligned with the Nazis prior to the Second World War, and a number of them attended the royal wedding. Protocol demanded that the prospective Prince-Consort be invited to an audience with his head of state, who was Adolf Hitler. Hitler gave an account of the conversation that he had with Bernhard in his TablecTalk. The book was a collection of monologues, remarks and speeches that Hitler gave during lunch or dinner to those he had invited. In those notes, Hitler is recorded to have said that Bernhard approached him, shortly after the start of the Nazi regime, with an offer of support to increase German influence in the Netherlands.

When asked in an interview in 2004 why he changed sides and started fighting against his homeland Germany, Bernhard claimed that he did not believe that Hitler and his regime had no plans to invade the Netherlands. Once Germany attacked his new homeland of the Netherlands in 1940; Bernhard's feelings towards his birth country of Germany changed to antagonism, and he had no problems fighting against Germany for the rest of the war.

The Dutch government's information bureau Rijksvoorlichtingsdienst (RVD) would later confirm in 2023, years after the death, that Bernhard was member of the NSDAP, and that the Koninklijk Huisarchief (Royal House Archive) does still have Bernhard's original party membership card in his file.

== Second World War ==
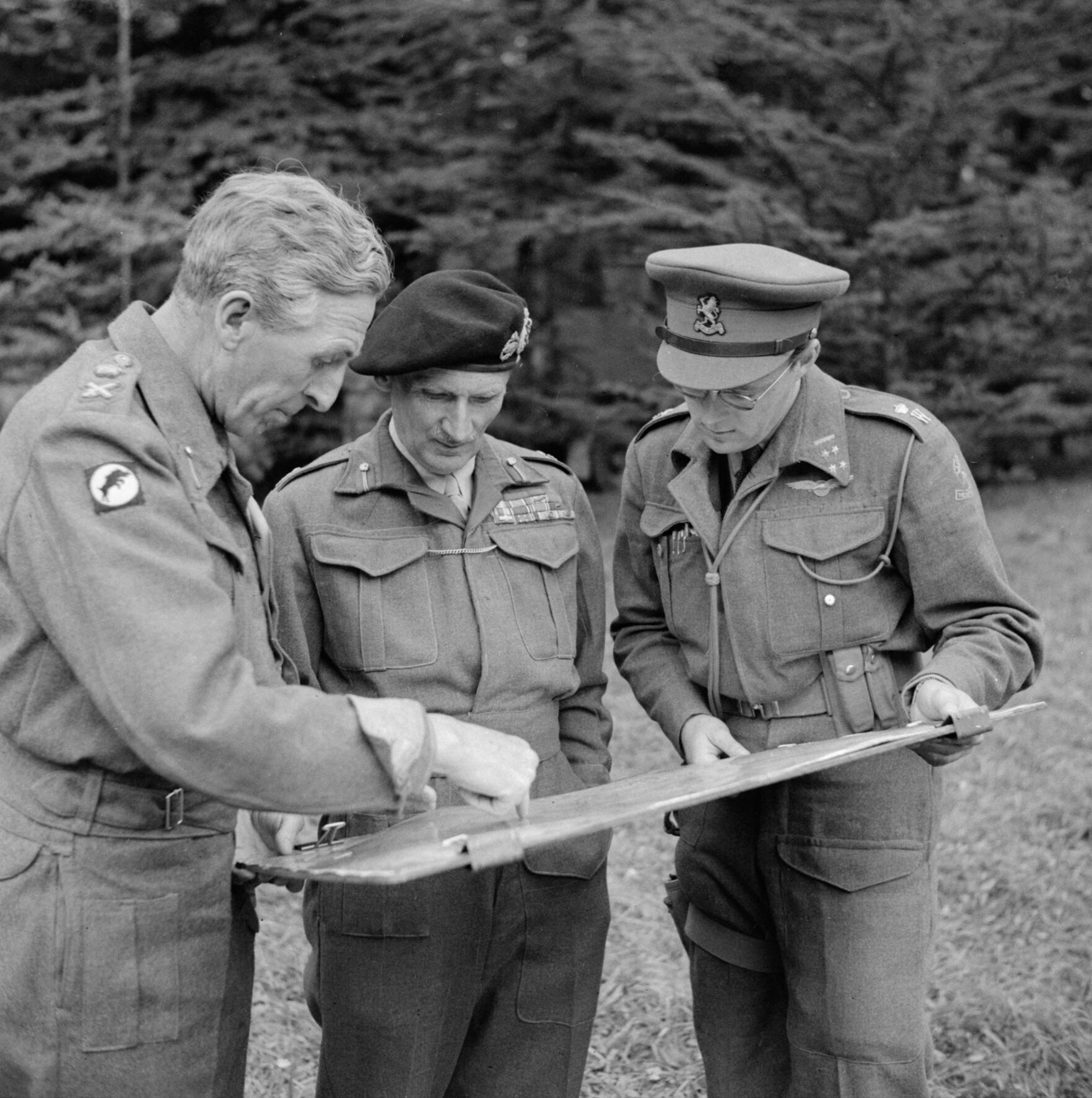
General Brian Horrocks, Field Marshal Bernard Montgomery and Prince Bernhard before Operation Market Garden on 8 September 1944

At the outset of the Second World War, during the German invasion of the Netherlands; the prince, carrying a machine gun, organised the palace guards into a combat group and shot at German warplanes. The royal family fled the Netherlands and took refuge in England. Disagreeing with Queen Wilhelmina's decision to leave the Kingdom, the prince, aged 28, is said at first to have refused to go and to have wanted to oppose the German occupation from within the country. However, in the end, he agreed to join his wife and became head of the Royal Military Mission based in London. His wife Princess Juliana and their children continued on to Canada, where they remained until the end of the war.

In England, Prince Bernhard asked to work in British Intelligence. The War Admiralty, and later General Eisenhower's Allied Command offices, did not trust him enough to allow him access to sensitive intelligence information. On the recommendation of Bernhard's friend and admirer King George VI; however, who was also of German aristocratic descent through his mother Mary of Teck, he was given access into the Intelligence organization.

Prince Bernhard was personally screened by British intelligence officer Ian Fleming at the behest of Winston Churchill. After Fleming's screening was positive, he was given work to do in the Allied War Planning Councils.

Ian Fleming, who personally knew Bernhard from their war efforts and from luncheons in the Lincoln's Inn Hotel in London, based some features of his fictional character James Bond on Bernhard. One of their luncheons is explained in Andrew Lycett's biography of Ian Fleming. It actually resulted in a life-threatening event, as the entrance and a 200-year-old staircase was destroyed during the bombardment of London by the Nazis. No one was injured. Prince Bernhard then lowered himself 20 feet to the lowest bit of staircase standing, and then said staunchly and with a mixture of Dutch/British flair, as nothing happened: "Most enjoyable evening!" Bernhard's favorite drink during his meeting with Ian Fleming was a vodka martini shaken, not stirred. Bernhard's favorite car in London was a Bentley 4.5 litre, the same car Bond had in Fleming's first books. He also owned many Ferraris and several Aston Martins and was known as a very flamboyant personality.

Bernhard also had a close relationship with the Americans during the war, that continued after the war in his work as chairman of the Bilderberg conference. He worked with and continued to be friends with Walter Bedell Smith and Allen Dulles, both working for the US Army during the war and later at the CIA. He knew US Presidents Roosevelt and Eisenhower. Bernhard also became acquainted with Ambassador Joseph Kennedy due to his role as a liaison between Europe and the US, connection to intelligence, multinationals and European royalty.

"For Bernhard, the Prince of the Netherlands, the war was a frustrating business. Born a German, he had married Queen Wilhelmina's only child, Princess Juliana, and in due time made a conscious and meaningful transition of loyalties to his new homeland. Because of this, and in view of the doubts his background initially evoked among some Britons, he longed more than anyone for a chance to get at Holland's aggressors." Erik Hazelhoff Roelfzema aka "Soldier of Orange", decorated war hero.

On 25 June 1940, three days after France fell to the German war machine, Bernhard spoke on the Overseas Service of the BBC. He called Hitler a German tyrant and expressed his confidence that Britain would defeat the Third Reich.

In 1940, Flight Lieutenant Murray Payne gave the prince instruction in flying a Spitfire. The prince made 1,000 flight-hours in a Spitfire with the RAF's No. 322 (Dutch) Squadron RAF, wrecking two planes during landings. He remained an active pilot throughout his life and flew his last aeroplane 53 years later, with his grandson and heir to the throne, who inherited his passion for flying.

In 1941, Prince Bernhard was given the honorary rank of wing commander in the Royal Air Force. As "Wing Commander Gibbs (RAF)", Prince Bernhard flew over occupied Europe, attacking V-1 launch pads in a B-24 Liberator, bombing Pisa, and engaging submarines over the Atlantic in a B-25 Mitchell, and conducting reconnaissance over enemy-held territory in an L-5 Grasshopper. Prince Bernhard was awarded the Dutch Airman's Cross for his "ability and perseverance" (Dutch: "bekwaamheid en volharding"). In 1941 he also received a promotion to Honorary Air Commodore.

He also helped organise the Dutch resistance movement and acted as the personal secretary for Queen Wilhelmina.

Queen Wilhelmina erased the style "honorary" (the exact words were "à la suite") in the decree promoting Bernhard to General. In this unconstitutional manner, she gave this Royal Prince a status that was never intended by either Parliament or her Ministers. The Minister of Defence did not choose to correct the Monarch, and the Prince took an active and important role in the Dutch armed forces.

By 1944, Prince Bernhard became Commander of the Dutch Armed Forces. After the liberation of the Netherlands, he returned with his family and became active in the negotiations for the German surrender. He was present during the Armistice negotiations and German surrender at Hotel de Wereld ("The World Hotel"), Wageningen in The Netherlands on 5 May 1945, where he avoided speaking German. The Prince was a genuine war hero in the eyes of most of the Dutch; he kept cordial relations with the Communists who fought against the Nazis. In the post-war years, he earned respect for his work in helping to reinvigorate the economy of the Netherlands.

== Postwar roles ==
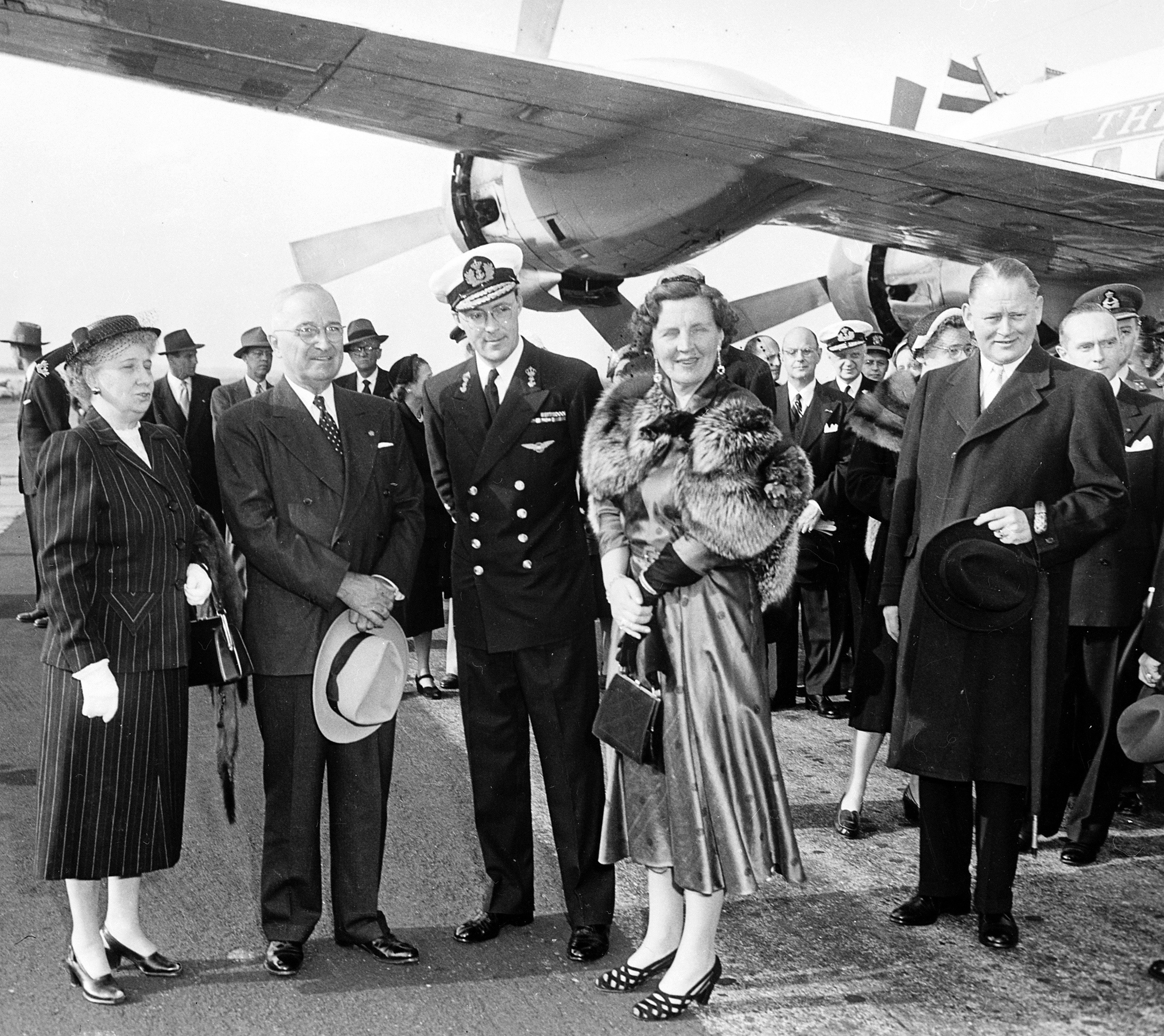
Queen Juliana and Prince Bernhard with President of the United States Harry S. Truman and First Lady Bess Truman at Washington National Airport on 2 April 1952

After the War, the position of Inspector General was created for the Prince. On 4 September 1948, his mother-in-law Queen Wilhelmina abdicated the throne and Juliana became Queen of the Netherlands with Bernhard becoming prince consort. He was made a member of the boards of supervisors of Fokker Aircraft and KLM Royal Dutch Airlines, and within a few years he had been invited to serve as an adviser or non-executive director of numerous corporations and institutions. There have been claims that KLM helped Nazis to leave Germany for Argentina on KLM flights while Bernhard was on its board. After a 1952 trip with Queen Juliana to the United States, Prince Bernhard was heralded by the media as a business ambassador extraordinaire for the Netherlands.

== Bilderberg ==
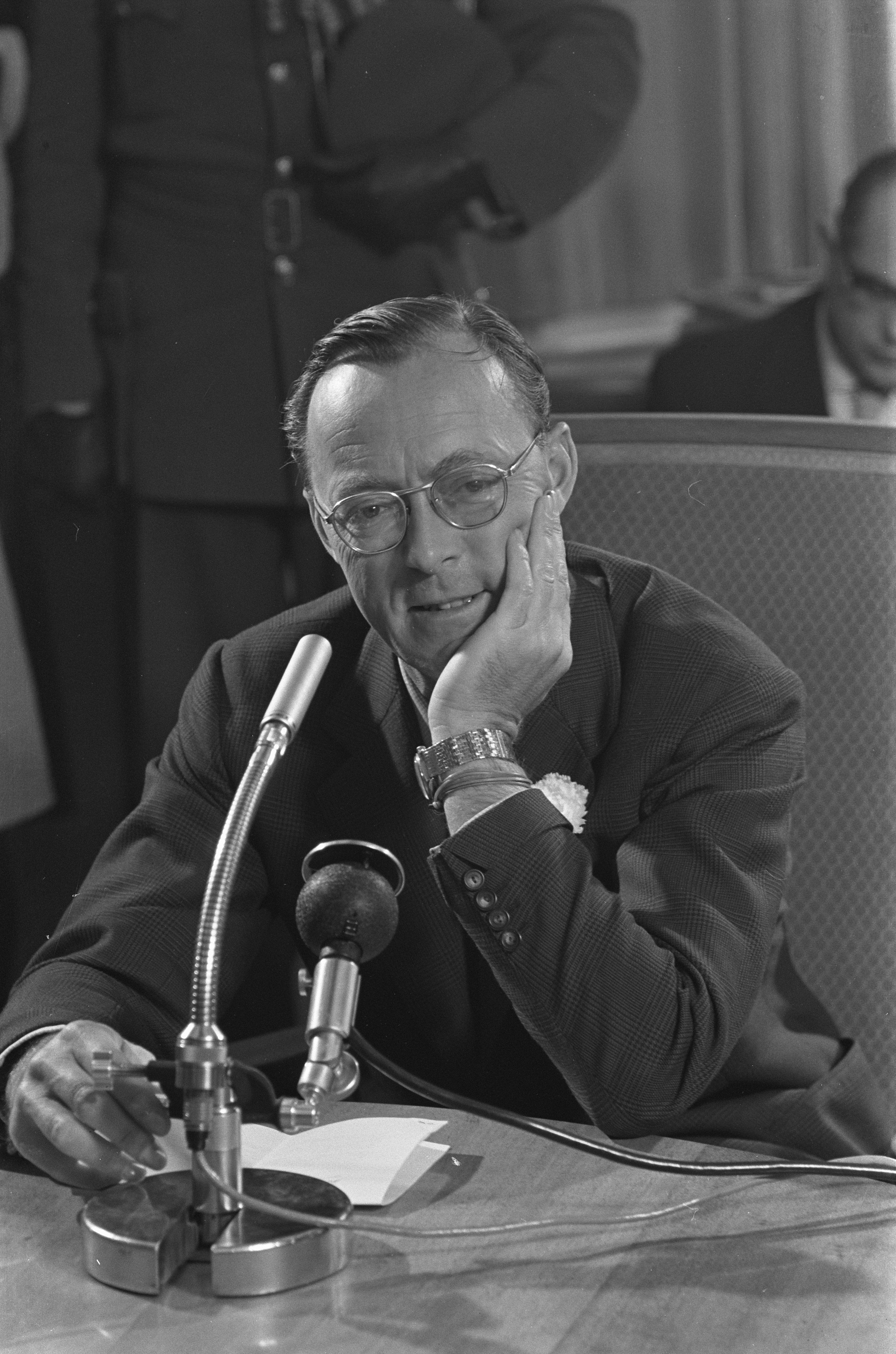
Prince Bernhard at Amsterdam Airport Schiphol on 4 November 1959.

In the early 1951 Polish diplomat, Józef Retinger contacted Prince Berhard with the idea to create an international conference between European and US greatest influencers to create a better relationship between Europe and the United States. This led to an informal meeting in Paris in 1952 where they discussed the idea with Paul Rijkens of Unilever, Paul van Zeeland, one of the founders of the EU and advisor to NATO and the Belgian government, retired British Army General Colin Gubbins of special military operation, French former prime minister Antoine Pinay, Danish conservative leader Kraft and 5 other political leaders. After this Bernhard contacted Walter Bedell Smith, director of the CIA and old war friend to help him get things started in the US. Bedell Smith was happy to help set up this meeting and got media expert C.D.Jackson involved in the project. Banker David Rockefeller also had an important role creating the Bilderberg. Finally in May 1954 Bernhard was organizer and chairman of the first Bilderberg and essential in organising a meeting at the Bilderberg Hotel in the Netherlands for the business elite and intellectuals of the Western World to discuss the economic problems in the face of what they characterised as the growing threat from Communism. This first meeting was successful, and it became an annual gathering known as the Bilderberg Group. The idea for the European Union, first proposed by Robert Schuman on 9 May 1950, was encouraged at Bilderberg.

Prince Bernhard was a very outspoken person who often flouted protocol by remarking upon subjects about which he felt deeply. Almost until his last day, he called for more recognition for the Polish veterans of the Second World War, who had figured greatly in the liberation of the Netherlands. However, it was not until after his death that the Dutch Government publicly recognised the important role of the Polish Army in the liberation, when on 31 May 2006, at the Binnenhof in The Hague, Queen Beatrix conferred the Military William Order, the highest Dutch military decoration, on the Polish 1st Independent Parachute Brigade. The award is now worn by the 6th Airborne Brigade which inherited the battle honours of the brigade.

== First president of the World Wildlife Fund ==
Prince Bernhard helped found the WWF and was the first president of the WWF from its founding year 1961 until 1976. To fund the WWF, he created the 1001 club in 1970. It was an exclusive club of members that helped raise US$10 million for the WWF, including people like Henry Ford, Gianni Agnelli, Alfred Heineken. He was deeply involved in the creation of numerous nature reserves, including the Chitwan National Park in Nepal, tiger reserves in India, Biebrza National Park in Poland, and the Taï National Park in Côte d'Ivoire.

== Friendships, jetset and international connections ==
Prince Bernhard was seen as a jet-setting and charismatic ambassador for the Dutch during post-war reconstruction. He was well known for his exclusive car collection, which included special edition Ferraris made for him by his friend Enzo Ferrari and his love for racing competitions, like Formula 1. He owned 14 Ferraris Berhard travelled around the world; he had his own airplane and had a licence to fly, having been part of the Royal Air Force during the war. After the war, he bought a Douglas C-47 Skytrain from the US army and used it as his personal plane.

He travelled to places like France, Italy, Argentina, Africa, England and the US where he had many friends in high places. His language skills included Dutch, German, French, English and Spanish. Prince Bernhard reportedly maintained friendships with several high-profile international figures. They included Nelson Mandela due to his interest in National Parks and work for WWF, David Rockefeller as one of his colleagues at Bilderberg, Mohammad Reza Shah Pahlavi, Eva Perón was part of his connection with Argentina, Enzo Ferrari and Gianni Agnelli due to his interest in cars and racing, Ian Fleming, Walter Bedell Smith. and Allen Dulles due to his time in London during the war working with British and US Intelligence and the Dutch military/resistance.

== Scandals and rumours ==
=== BS militia ===
The Binnenlandse Strijdkrachten (BS, Domestic Armed Forces) militia, set up and under command of Prince Bernhard towards the end of World War II, gained a notorious reputation for unruly and out-of-control behavior including incidents of pillaging and plundering at the time the country was being liberated from Nazi occupation. Prince Bernhard was appointed commander of this militia in early September 1944 by Queen Wilhelmina, who had unified several Dutch resistance groups into the BS. However, under Bernhard's leadership, the militia proved difficult to control and was marred by controversy due to its disorderly conduct and failure to reign in misbehavior among its ranks.

One of the worst incidents occurred in the afternoon of 7 May 1945 on Dam square, Amsterdam. The BS militia was explicitly warned not to provoke and disarm German soldiers, as this was designated to be the responsibility of the approaching Canadian Allied forces. The armistice agreement on May 4, 1945, included the condition that only Allied units would directly carry out the disarming of German troops in the Netherlands. However, Prince Bernhard's BS militia on the ground disregarded their orders and arrested two German soldiers nearby Dam square. One German soldier refused to surrender his weapon, fired a shot, and was subsequently killed by the militia. This act provoked German soldiers, who were stationed inside the nearby Groote Club building, to open fire on the crowd celebrating the end of the war. They fired machine guns from windows, balconies, and the roof into the crowd, resulting in panic and a chaotic shootout lasting about two hours, with over three dozen bystanders killed.

=== Hofmans Affair ===
In the mid-1950s, Queen Juliana and Prince Bernhard's marriage faced significant strain because of the ongoing influence of Greet Hofmans, a faith healer and layer-on of hands. For nine years she acted as a confidante and adviser to Queen Juliana, often residing at Palace Soestdijk. Originally, Hofmans was introduced to Queen Juliana at the initiative of Prince Bernhard in 1948 to treat an eye illness of their youngest daughter, Princess Christina (then still called Marijke). This illness arose because Juliana was infected with rubella during pregnancy. Hofmans developed an influence on the Queen, encouraging pacifist ideas. In the period of the Cold War, this caused a crisis in the Royal Household.

While the Dutch press did not report widely on the issue, outside the Netherlands, a great deal was written about the Hofmans affair. On 13 June 1956, an article was published in the German magazine Der Spiegel, titled "Zwischen Königin und Rasputin" – "between the Queen and her Rasputin". It portrayed Hofmans in a less-than-flattering way. Later, Bernhard admitted that he had personally provided the information for the article. Observers said that, in doing so, he hoped to have Hofmans removed from the court. In the face of escalating tensions, the couple appointed a committee of "three wise men" (elder statesmen) to advise the royal couple. Hofmans was banished as were various allies and supporters who had grown to prominence within the Royal Household.

In 2008 the report of the "three wise men" was made public. Historian Cees Fasseur drew from it for his book, Juliana & Bernhard (2008); in addition, the Queen had granted him access to the private royal archive. He noted that Bernhard was reprimanded in 1956 for having leaked confidential information to the international press. Fasseur said that Bernhard resorted to bringing in the international press only after repeated, desperate and often dramatic pleading with his wife to distance herself from the Hofmans group. Fasseur wrote:

"Bernard was obviously a free spirited chap, who independently went about his business. But he was still very much a family man. I got the feeling he was the only one that was seeing things were getting completely out of hand and tried to salvage the situation as much as he could."

=== Lockheed scandal ===
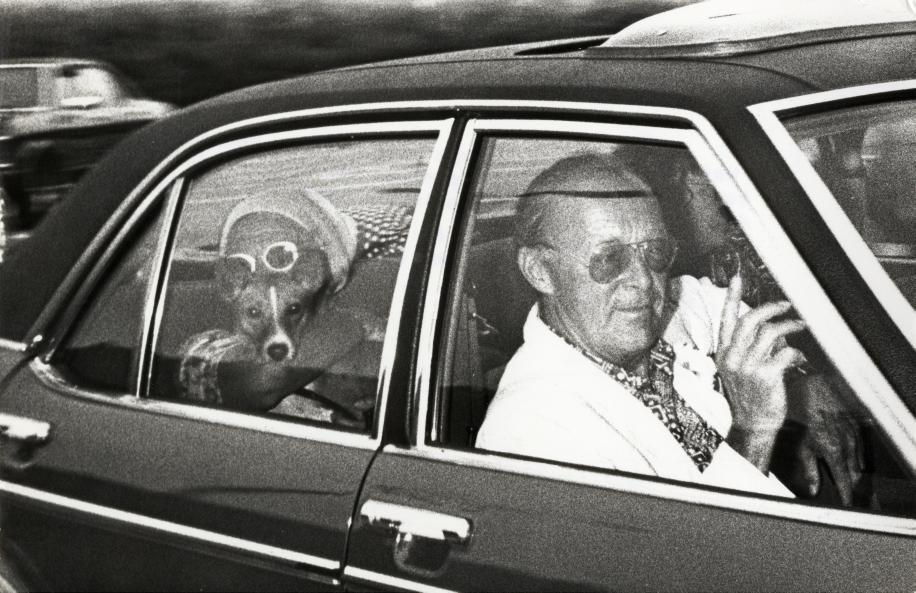
Queen Juliana and Prince Bernhard returning from Porto Ercole, Italy, due to developments in the Lockheed scandal on 26 August 1976.

Scandal rocked the royal family in 1976 when the press reported that Prince Bernhard had accepted a US$1.1 million bribe from U.S. aircraft manufacturer Lockheed Corporation to influence the Dutch government's purchase of fighter aircraft. At the time he had served on more than 300 corporate boards and committees worldwide and had been praised in the Netherlands for his efforts to promote the economic well-being of the country. Joop den Uyl, the Prime Minister of the Netherlands, ordered an inquiry into the Lockheed affair. Prince Bernhard refused to answer reporters' questions, stating: "I am above such things".

The Dutch and international press headlined the stories for months. They also brought up records of Prince Bernhard's Reiter SS membership and details of his numerous extramarital affairs. They noted he had purchased a luxurious Paris apartment for his mistress Hélène Grinda (granddaughter of Édouard Grinda), with whom he had a daughter, Alexia, who was illegitimate. Bernhard had an older illegitimate daughter, Alicia, born in the United States (with a German pilot whom he met in Mexico in 1951).

On 26 August 1976, a full report of Prince Bernhard's activities was released to a shocked Dutch public. The Prince's own letter of 1974, to Lockheed Corporation, was publicised; he had demanded "commissions" be paid to him on Dutch government aircraft purchases. This was very damaging evidence of improper conduct by the man who was Inspector-General of the Dutch Armed Forces. Out of respect for Queen Juliana, the government did not press charges against Bernhard.

Prince Bernhard resigned as Inspector-General of the Dutch Armed Forces. He was no longer officially allowed to wear a uniform in public. But a few years later, he was in full military dress when he attended the 1979 funeral of Lord Mountbatten in London.

Prime Minister Joop den Uyl made a statement in Parliament and told the delegates that the Prince would also resign from his various high-profile positions in businesses, charities, and other institutions. The Dutch States-General voted against criminal prosecution. Prince Bernhard turned over the Presidency of the international World Wildlife Fund to Prince Philip, Duke of Edinburgh.

In an interview published after his death, on 14 December 2004, Prince Bernhard admitted that he had accepted more than one million dollars (US) in bribes from Lockheed. He acknowledged it was a mistake and claimed that all of the money went to the WWF. He said: "I have accepted that the word Lockheed will be carved on my tombstone." He also confirmed having fathered two illegitimate daughters.

In February 2008, Joop den Uyl's biography claimed that the official report investigating the Lockheed bribe scandal also presented proof that the Prince had accepted money from yet another aerospace firm: Northrop. The former Prime Minister claimed he had not made the information public to protect the Dutch monarchy.

=== Project Lock ===
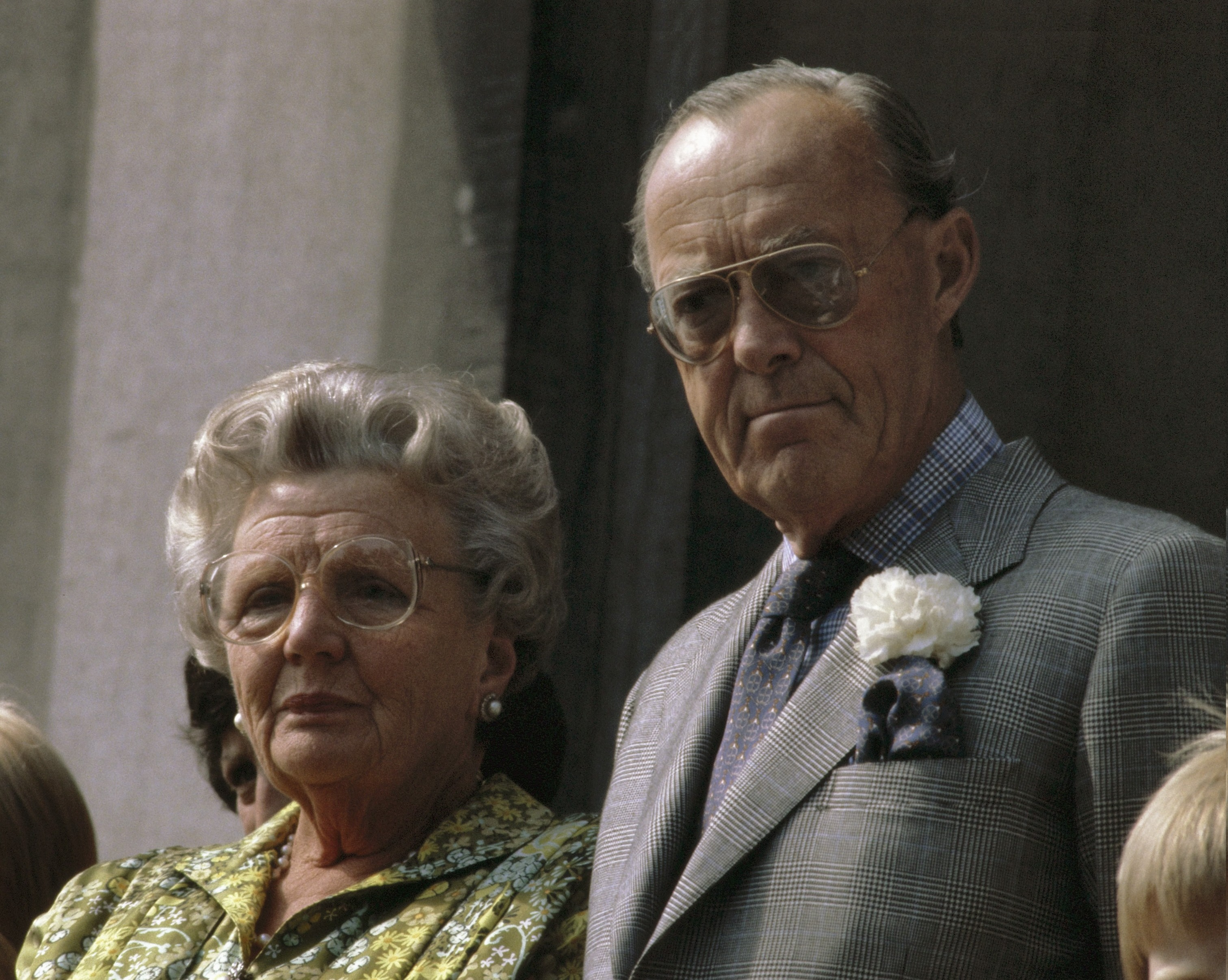
Princess Juliana and Prince Bernhard at Soestdijk Palace on 31 May 1980.

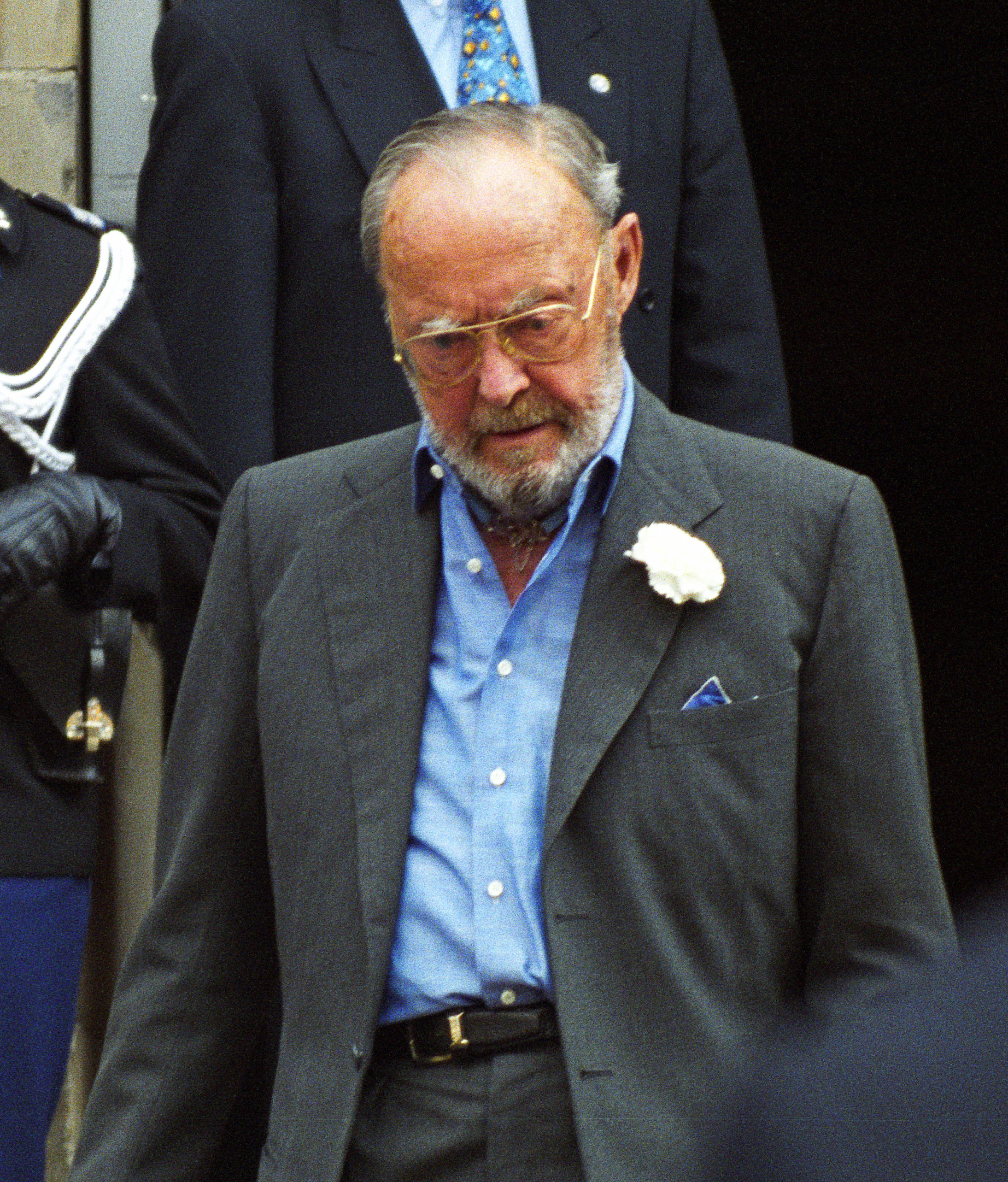
Prince Bernhard wearing his trademark carnation in Amsterdam on 6 July 1999.

In 1988, Prince Bernhard and Princess Juliana sold two paintings from their personal collection to raise money for the World Wildlife Fund. The paintings sold for £700,000, which was deposited in a Swiss WWF bank account. In 1989, however, Charles de Haes, Director-General of the WWF, transferred £500,000 back to Bernhard, for what De Haes called a private project. In 1991, newspapers reported that WWF was acting as a front for an operation involving people of military and intelligence background and under the leadership or coordination of Prince Bernhard, who had hired KAS International or KAS Enterprises, a private contractor owned by Special Air Service founder Sir David Stirling, to use mercenaries – mostly British – to ostensibly fight poachers in nature reserves. The paramilitary group supposedly infiltrated organisations profiting from illegal trade in ivory to arrest them.

This Project Lock seemed to have backfired enormously, however. The hired mercenaries had not only infiltrated the illegal trade, they were also participating in it and benefitting financially, and worse, were using the entire WWF project as cover to conduct secret paramilitary operations in multiple African nations.

In 1995, Nelson Mandela called upon the Kumleben Commission to investigate, among other things, the role of the WWF in apartheid-South Africa. In the report that followed, it was suggested that mercenaries from Project Lock had planned assassinations of ANC members and that mercenaries had been running training camps in the wildlife reserves, training fighters for rebel groups UNITA (Angola) and Renamo (Mozambique). Prince Bernhard was never accused of any crime in this context, but the Project Lock scandal negatively impacted the Prince's reputation.

=== Additional controversies and rumours ===
Prince Bernhard garnered media attention when, on 30 October 2002, he paid the fines of two Albert Heijn supermarket staff members, who were convicted of assaulting a shoplifter after they detained him.

The 2009 publication HRH: High Stakes at the Court of His Royal Highness by historian Harry Veenendaal and journalist Jort Kelder alleges that the Prince in 1950 attempted to oust the young government of the newly founded Republic of Indonesia and place himself to lead the islands as viceroy similar to Lord Mountbatten's role in British India. This was particularly contentious as in 1949 the Netherlands had already officially recognised its former colony as an independent nation.

A 2016 biography by Jolande Withuis about Queen Juliana, titled Juliana, posited further rumours including that Bernhard had once sexually assaulted a minor, that he had refused to divorce the queen twice, and that later on during their final years in life he prohibited Juliana from seeing him.

== Later life and death ==
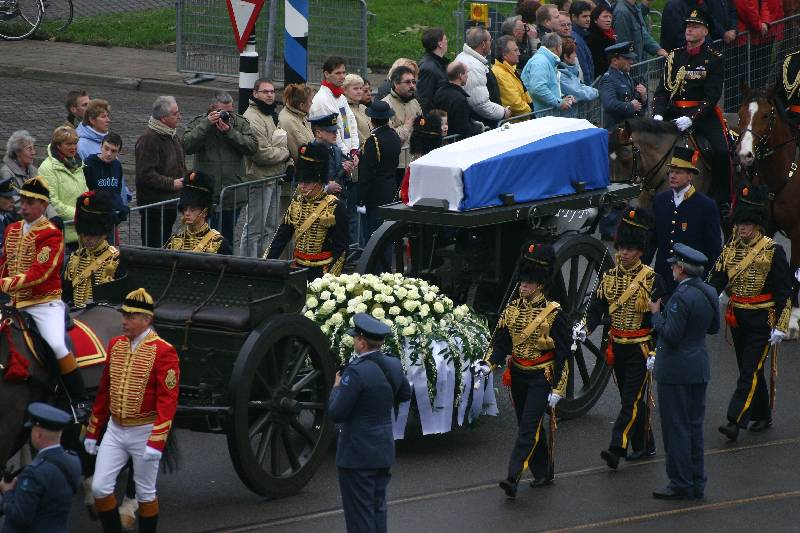
The state funeral of Prince Bernhard of the Netherlands, on 11 December 2004 in Delft, Netherlands

In 1994, the Prince had a colon tumour removed and suffered severe complications due to respiratory distress. In December, his daughter Queen Beatrix rushed to the hospital straight after landing from a trip to Africa. By Christmas the prospect of death had faded and by spring the next year he recovered enough to go home. His health problems continued in 1998 when he had a prostate swelling and in 1999 when he suffered difficulties breathing and talking. He did, however, attend the wedding of his grandson, straight after having prostate surgery. In 2000, his life was endangered again when he suffered neurological complications and continued breathing problems. Two days after intensive medical attention the Royal Press Office issued a statement the Prince was reading newspapers again.

Over the following years Bernhard continued to appear at the military parades on the national liberation day celebrating the defeat of Nazi Germany. Only when Juliana died in March 2004 did Bernhard become exceedingly fragile. Up to the last moment it remained uncertain if he could attend the royal funeral, which he eventually managed to attend. He said his final farewells to his war comrades on Liberation Day in May and in November that same year he was diagnosed with untreatable cancer.

Bernhard died of lung cancer at the age of 93 at University Medical Center Utrecht in Utrecht on 1 December 2004. Ten days later, he was interred with a state funeral at the Nieuwe Kerk, Delft. Bernhard's funeral was different from those of Prince Claus and Queen Juliana in that Bernhard's coffin was transported on the undercarriage of a cannon instead of in the traditional carriage used when the coffins of Prince Claus and Queen Juliana were transported to Delft. Together with the playing of many military marches and the forming of guards of honour by Second World War veterans this gave the funeral procession a military character as the late Prince, a Second World War veteran, had wished. As a final tribute to his former military role in the Royal Netherlands Air Force, three modern F-16 jet fighters and a World War II Spitfire plane performed a low flypast during the funeral in a classic missing man formation.

== In popular culture ==
In the years after Bernhard died his life story has been the inspiration for literature, theatre, television and comic books. In 2010 fact and fiction of the life of Bernhard was portrayed in a Dutch television series. In a biographical dissertation by Dutch journalist and historian Annejet van der Zijl published in March 2010, Bernhard was called "a failure" in the history of the Dutch royal family and a "creature of his own myths".

== Titles, styles and honours ==
Personal Coat of arms of Prince Bernhard of Lippe-Biesterfeld

=== Titles ===
- 29 June 1911 – 24 February 1916: Your High-born Count Bernhard of Biesterfeld
- 24 February 1916 – 7 January 1937: His Serene Highness Prince Bernhard of Lippe-Biesterfeld
- 7 January 1937 – 6 September 1948: His Royal Highness Prince Bernhard of the Netherlands, Prince of Lippe-Biesterfeld
- 6 September 1948 – 30 April 1980: His Royal Highness The Prince of the Netherlands
- 30 April 1980 – 1 December 2004: His Royal Highness Prince Bernhard of the Netherlands, Prince of Lippe-Biesterfeld

=== Honours ===
==== National honours ====
- Commander of the Military William Order
- Knight Grand Cross of the Order of the Netherlands Lion
- Knight Grand Cross of the Order of Orange-Nassau
- Founder, Grand Master & Commander of the Order of the Golden Ark
- Commander of the Order of St. John in the Netherlands
- Recipient of the Airman's Cross
- Recipient of the Queen Juliana Inauguration Medal

==== Foreign honours ====
- Argentina: Grand Cross of the Order of the Liberator General San Martín
- Austria: Grand Star of the Decoration for Services to the Republic of Austria
- Belgium: Grand Cordon with crossed swords of the Order of Leopold
- Belgium: Recipient of the Croix de Guerre
- Brazil:
  - Grand Cross of the Order of the Southern Cross
  - Grand Cross of the Order of Aeronautical Merit
  - Grand Cross of the Order of Naval Merit
- Cameroon: Grand Cordon of the Order of Valour
- Chile: Grand Cross of the Order of Merit
- Czech Republic: Grand Cross of the Order of the White Lion
- Czechoslovakia: Recipient of the Czechoslovak War Cross 1939–1945
- Chile: Grand Cross of the Order of Merit
- Colombia: Grand Cross of the Order of Boyacá, Special Class
- Denmark: Knight of the Order of the Elephant
- Dominican Republic: Grand Cross with Silver Breast Star of the Order of Merit of Duarte, Sánchez and Mella
- Ecuador: Member 1st Class of the Order of Abdon Calderón
- (Ethiopia) Ethiopian Imperial Family: Collar of the Order of the Queen of Sheba
- Finland: Grand Cross of the Order of the White Rose of Finland
- France: Grand Cross of the Order of the Legion of Honour
- France: Commander of the Order of Academic Palms
- France: Recipient of the Aeronautical Medal
- Germany: Grand Cross special class of the Order of Merit of the Federal Republic of Germany
- Greece
  - (Kingdom of Greece) Greek royal family:
    - Grand Cross of the Order of the Redeemer
    - Knight Grand Cross of the Order of George I
  - Greece: Recipient of the 1940 War Cross Medal
- Honduras: Grand Cross of the Order of Santa Rosa and of Civilisation
- Indonesia: Star of Mahaputera, 1st Class
- (Iran) Iranian Imperial Family:
  - Knight Grand Cordon of the Order of the Lion and the Sun
  - Recipient of the Commemorative Medal of the 2,500 year Celebration of the Persian Empire
- Italy: Knight Grand Cross of the Order of Merit of the Italian Republic
- Ivory Coast: Grand Cross of the National Order of the Ivory Coast
- Japan: Grand Cordon of the Order of the Rising Sun
- Liberia: Grand Cordon of the Order of the Pioneers of Liberia
- Luxembourg: Knight of the Order of the Gold Lion of the House of Nassau
- Luxembourg: Recipient of the War Cross Medal 1939–1945
- Mexico: Collar of the Order of the Aztec Eagle
- (Kingdom of Nepal) Nepal: Member of the Order of Ojaswi Rajanya
- Nicaragua: Grand Cross of the Order of Rubén Darío, Special Class
- Norway: Knight Grand Cross of the Order of Saint Olav
- Panama: Grand Cross of the Order of Manuel Amador Guerrero
- Paraguay: Grand Cross of the Order of Merit, Special Class
- Peru: Grand Cross of the Order of the Sun of Peru
- Poland: Grand Cross of the Order of Military Virtue
- Senegal: Grand Cross of the National Order of Merit
- Sovereign Military Order of Malta: Bailiff Knight Grand Cross of Honour and Devotion of the Sovereign Military Order of Malta
- Spain: Knight Grand Cross of the Order of Charles III
- Suriname: Grand Cordon of the Honorary Order of the Yellow Star
- Sweden: Knight of the Royal Order of the Seraphim
- Thailand: Knight of the Order of the Royal House of Chakri
- Tunisia: Grand Cross of the Order of Independence
- United Kingdom:
  - Honorary Knight Grand Cross of the Order of the Bath
  - Honorary Knight Grand Cross of the Royal Victorian Order
  - Recipient of the France and Germany Star
  - Recipient of the Defence Medal
  - Recipient of the King George VI Coronation Medal
  - Recipient of the Queen Elizabeth II Coronation Medal
- United States: Chief Commander of the Legion of Merit
- Venezuela: Grand Cross of the Order of the Liberator
- Kingdom of Yugoslavia: Grand Cross of the Order of Karađorđe's Star

== Military ranks ==
=== Netherlands ===
Discharged from all military functions in September 1976

Royal Netherlands Army	Date	–	Captain	3 December 1936	–	Major general	25 May 1942	–	Lieutenant general	15 December 1943	–	General	3 September 1944

Royal Netherlands East Indies Army	Date	–	Captain	23 August 1940	–	Lieutenant general	15 December 1943	–	General	3 September 1944

Royal Netherlands Navy	Date	–	Lieutenant commander	3 December 1936	–	Captain	23 August 1940	–	Rear admiral	25 May 1942	–	Vice admiral	15 December 1943	–	Lieutenant admiral	3 September 1944

Royal Netherlands Air Force	Date	–	Air Chief Marshal	27 March 1953

=== Honorary foreign ranks ===
Royal Air Force	Date	–	Air commodore	4 April 1941	–	Air marshal	15 September 1964

Royal New Zealand Air Force	Date	–	Air commodore	19 August 1946

== Ancestry ==
Ancestors of Prince Bernhard of Lippe-Biesterfeld

8. Julius, Count of Lippe-Biesterfeld
4. Ernest, Count of Lippe-Biesterfeld
9. Countess Adelheid of Castell-Castell
2. Prince Bernhard of Lippe
10. Count Leopold Otto von Wartensleben
5. Countess Karoline von Wartensleben
11. Mathilde Halbach
1. Prince Bernhard of Lippe-Biesterfeld
12. Wolfgang Adolf von Cramm
6. Baron Aschwin von Sierstorpff-Cramm
13. Hedwig von Cramm
3. Armgard von Cramm
14. Count Ernst Moritz von Sierstorpff-Driburg
7. Baroness Hedwig von Sierstorpff-Driburg
15. Baroness Karoline von Vincke

Prince Bernhard of Lippe-Biesterfeld House of Lippe Born: 29 June 1911 Died: 1 December 2004
Dutch royalty
Vacant Title last held by Duke Henry of Mecklenburg-Schwerin	Prince consort of the Netherlands; 1948–1980	Succeeded by Claus von Amsberg
Non-profit organization positions
First	Chairmen of the Bilderberg Group; 1954–1976	Succeeded by Alec Douglas-Home
First	President of the World Wide Fund for Nature; 1961–1977	Succeeded by John Hugo Loudon
Military offices
Vacant Title last held by Henri Winkelman	Commander-in-chief of the Armed forces of the Netherlands; 1944–1945	Vacant Title next held by Henk Kruls as Chief of the Netherlands Defence Staff
First	Inspector General of the Royal Netherlands Army; 1945–1970	Became Inspector General of the Armed forces of the Netherlands
First	Inspector General of the Royal Netherlands Navy; 1946–1970	Became Inspector General of the Armed forces of the Netherlands
First	Inspector General of the Royal Netherlands Air Force; 1953–1970	Became Inspector General of the Armed forces of the Netherlands
First	Inspector General of the Armed forces of the Netherlands; 1970–1976	Succeeded by Witius Henrik de Savornin Lohman
