= Wojnowo, Lubusz Voivodeship =

Wojnowo
- Village
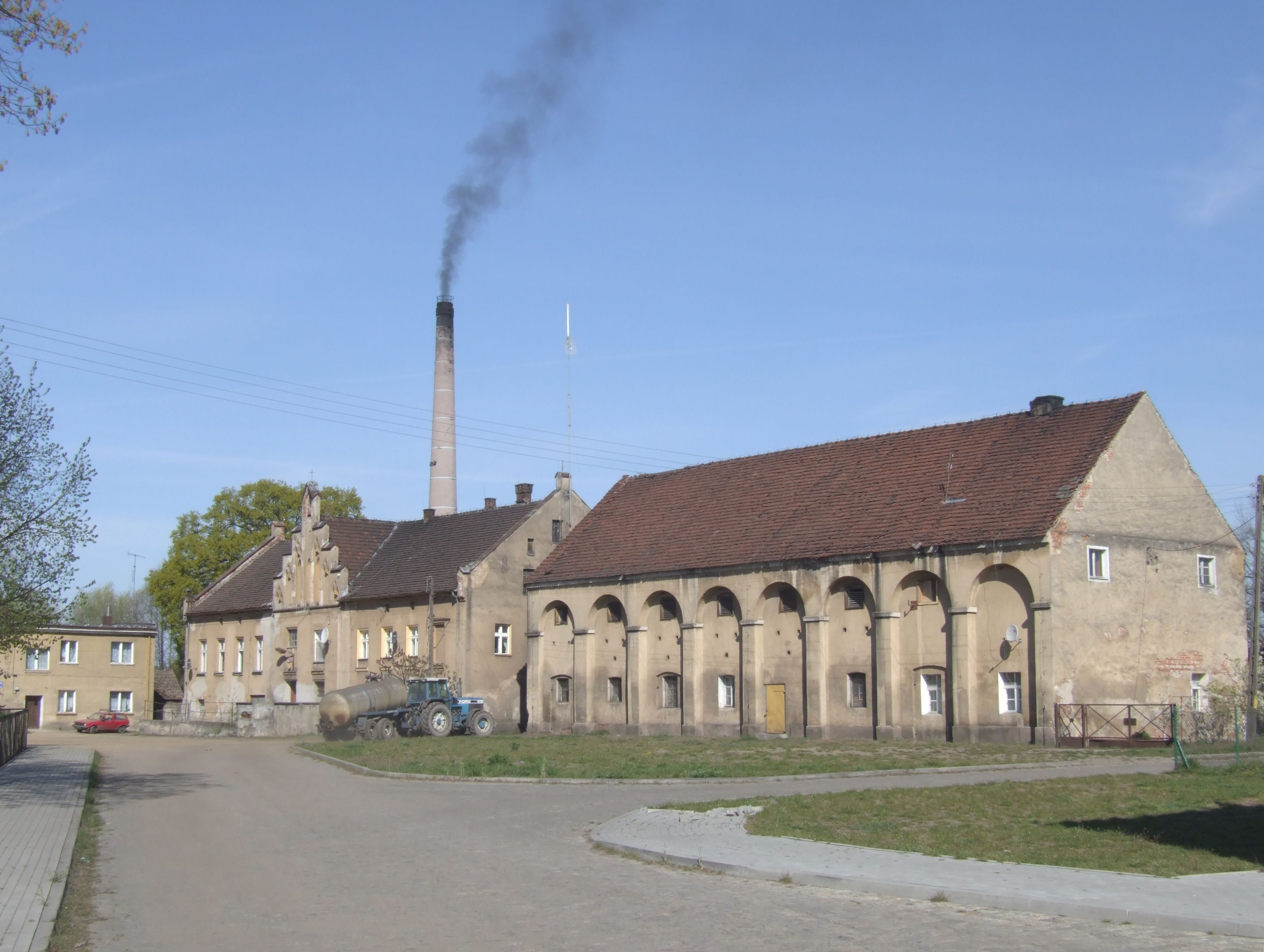
- Distillery in Wojnowo

- Location within Poland
- Coordinates: 52°6′N 15°47′E
- Country: Poland
- Voivodeship: Lubusz
- County: Zielona Góra
- Gmina: Kargowa
- Time zone: UTC+1 (CET)
  - Summer (DST): UTC+2 (CEST)
- Vehicle registration: FZI

Wojnowo [vɔi̯ˈnɔvɔ] is a village in the administrative district of Gmina Kargowa, within Zielona Góra County, Lubusz Voivodeship, in western Poland.

== History ==
Wojnowo was a private village of Polish nobility, administratively located in the Kościan County in the Poznań Voivodeship in the Greater Poland Province of the Kingdom of Poland.

During the German evacuation from occupied Poland in the final stages of World War II in 1945, a German-perpetrated death march of Jewish women from a just dissolved subcamp of the Gross-Rosen concentration camp in Sława passed through the village.

== Notable residents ==
- Prince Bernhard of Lippe-Biesterfeld (1911–2004)
