= Mésalliance =

Marriage between partners from different social classes

A mésalliance (also misalliance) is a marriage to an unsuitable partner. Typically used to define a union with a socially inferior partner, like morganatic marriage by a member of royal family, this gallicism is also used metaphorically, especially in the misalliance variant, to describe a generally unworkable association, for example, the ill-fated alliance of German nobility with Hitler.

Researchers also use terms hypergamy (for "marrying up") and hypogamy ("marrying down") to describe marriages involving partners from different social classes or status. Both terms were invented on the Indian subcontinent in the 19th century while translating classical Hindu law books, which used the Sanskrit terms anuloma (a bride is marrying a man from a higher caste) and pratiloma (husband is from lower caste). The hypergamy and hypogamy can therefore be considered as special cases of mésalliance.

Mésalliances break the patterns of endogamy (marrying within one's social group). The definitions of the "proper marriage" and consequences of ignoring them varied from one culture to another (for example, the nobles in the early modern Europe were expected to avoid marrying commoners, with issues of religion and wealth being considered of less importance).

== Nobility ==
For nobles, mésalliance denoted a scandal of a marriage between an aristocrat and a person of lower standing that might involve a loss of rank or inheritance. Although in the aristocratic circles this looked like a disaster, the noble mésalliances were not infrequent, driven by either romantic or financial considerations.

== France ==
The word mésalliance, originally of a French origin, had been used in English since the late 18th century (the Anglicised version, misalliance, had been recorded earlier). The French society of the 17th–18th centuries (the ancien régime) was built not of individuals, but of the families. These patriarchal families were living, for many generations, in a family house, a heritage from the ancestors that had to be preserved for the future generations at any cost. Every family member had their own hereditary social position and counted for nothing without the family. A mésalliance represented a direct threat to this system. Marrying for the status and wealth was the norm, so when the young Louis XIV was infatuated with Marie Mancini, he was forced to marry the Maria Theresa of Spain instead, with "father of all the fathers" thus adding Franche-Comté and part of the Flanders to the possessions of his "large family" (the state). But on the question of mésalliance the French Third Estate was "just as susceptible" as nobility.

During the 18th century, the nobility gradually lost all fear of mésalliances based on descent, and the highest nobility was marrying for money. Nicolas Chamfort remarked that "almost all the women ..., either in Versailles or Paris ..., are only bourgeoises de qualité".

== In art ==
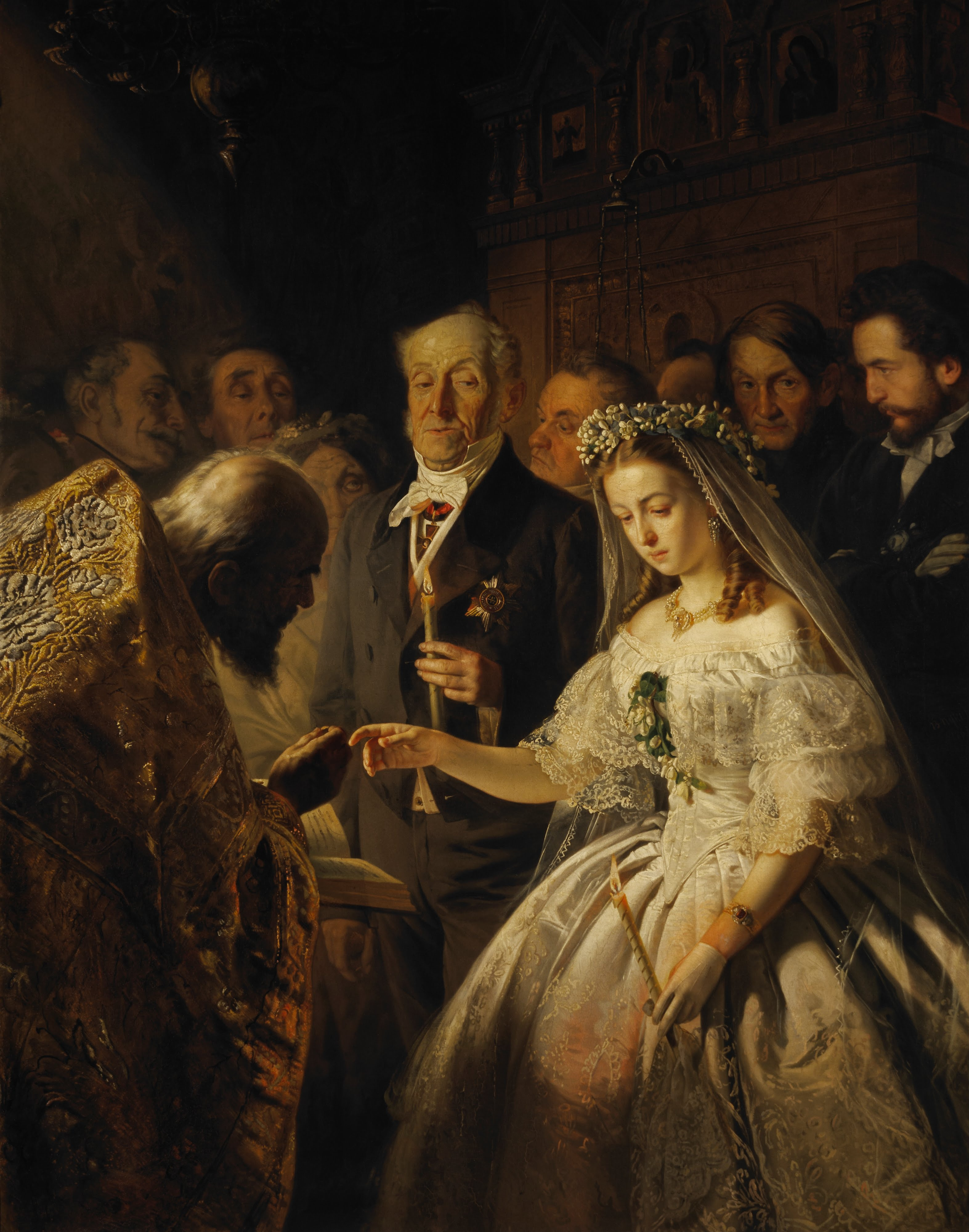
Unequal marriage (Vasili Pukirev, 1862)

Mésalliances had attracted attention of writers and artists since antiquity. The story of Apollonius of Tyre, an ancient Greek novel, describes Apollonius, a young king disguised as a fisherman, successfully wooing a princess. The tradition carried over through Mediaeval period (Nibelungen saga) to modern times with the stories of George Dandin, chevalier des Grieux, and the play Misalliance by Bernard Shaw.

Painters were attracted to the subject since at least the late 15th century, typically playing on a contrast between a young wife and her old husband, sometimes reversing the ages. Notable works were created by Quentin Matsys and Lucas Cranach the Elder.

== Sources ==
- Eckland, Bruce K. (1971). "Theories of Mate Selection". In Adams, Bert N.; Weirath, Thomas (eds.). Readings on the Sociology of the Family. Chicago: Markham. ISBN 0-8410-4025-7.
- Funck-Brentano, Frantz (1929). The Old Regime in France. Longmans, Green.
- Garner, Bryan A. (2022). "mésalliance; misalliance". Garner's Modern English Usage. Oxford University Press. ISBN 9780197599051.
- Geraerts, Jaap (2018-09-24). Patrons of the Old Faith: The Catholic Nobility in Utrecht and Guelders, c. 1580–1702. Brill. doi:10.1163/9789004337541_003. ISBN 978-90-04-33754-1.
- Malinowski, S.; Andrews, J. (2020). Nazis and Nobles: The History of a Misalliance. OUP Oxford. ISBN 978-0-19-258016-0.
- Shah, A. M. (6 December 2012). The Structure of Indian Society: Then and Now. Routledge. pp. 37–. ISBN 978-1-136-19770-3.
- Zheng, Dong (2020). Mésalliances et mariages inégaux: étude de cas dans des œuvres de l’âge classique (Doctorat thesis) (in French). Paris III: Université Sorbonne Nouvelle.
