= Hanno Konopath =

Hanno Konopath, also known as Friedrich (Kurt) Konopacki (24 February 1882 – 22 September 1962), was a German jurist and civil servant who gained attention as a publicist and proponent of völkisch-racist worldviews during the Weimar Republic. He was particularly active as an author of racial-ideological writings and as a contributor to journals associated with the Nordic-völkisch movement. He joined the NSDAP on 1 May 1930.

== Life ==
Hanno Konopath was born on 24 February 1882. Little is known about his early education and career. He worked at the Reichsversicherungsanstalt für Angestellte, in the Reich Ministry of Economics, and the Reich Ministry for Reconstruction. He held the title of Ministerialrat and is referred to in contemporary sources as Geheimrat.

On 24 February 1927, he married Marie Adelheid Prinzessin zur Lippe-Biesterfeld (1895–1993), a daughter of Rudolf Prinz zur Lippe-Biesterfeld and Luise Prinzessin von Ardeck. This was Marie Adelheid's third marriage. The marriage ended in divorce in 1936. It provided her with several important connections within the Nazi regime. Konopath died on 22 September 1962 at the age of 80.

== Journalistic Work ==
Konopath was active as a publicist in the 1920s and early 1930s within the völkisch movement. He published contributions in journals promoting a Nordic-racial worldview, including Die Sonne – Monatsschrift für nordische Weltanschauung und Lebensgestaltung, published, among others, by Alexander-Duncker-Verlag (Weimar).

He served both as an author and as a programmatic ideologue. In 1926, he contributed an article to Deutscher Dom in support of a call to organize the so-called "Nordic movement". Contemporary observers such as Bartsch criticized the Deutschgläubige Gemeinschaft represented by Konopath for not adequately perceiving societal change and political developments.

== Ideology and Positions ==
In his writings, Konopath promoted a racial-ideological and völkisch worldview, based on concepts such as “Rassenkunde” and “Rassenlehre”, the “völkisch idea”, an allegedly Germanic worldview, and the renewal of a “truly German spirit”. These positions clearly place him within the ideological sphere of the völkisch movement of the interwar period, parts of which were later adopted and radicalized by National Socialism.

== Major Work ==
His best-known work is Ist Rasse Schicksal? Grundgedanken der völkischen Bewegung (Munich: J. F. Lehmanns Verlag, 1926). The brochure (29 pages) deals with racial-historical and ideological questions from a völkisch perspective and is considered a typical example of racial-ideological literature of the 1920s.

== Other Activities ==
He attended the inaugural lecture of Hans F. K. Günther at University of Jena on 15 November 1930, alongside Wilhelm Frick, Hitler, Hermann Göring, and Paul Schultze-Naumburg.

In 1952 Konopath was involved in designs for a European flag, together with Richard Coudenhove-Kalergi, Gaetano Gambin, and Wolfram Neue. This activity occurred in the context of early, ideologically diverse Pan-Europe discussions after Word War II.

== Reception ==
In historical research, Konopath is primarily seen as a marginal figure in völkisch publishing. His writings are today mostly used as sources for the intellectual history of völkisch and racist thought in the Weimar Republic.

== Selected Works ==
- Ist Rasse Schicksal? Grundgedanken der völkischen Bewegung. J. F. Lehmanns Verlag, München 1926 (first edition with 28 illustrations)
- Contributions in Die Sonne – Monatsschrift für nordische Weltanschauung und Lebensgestaltung (e.g., 1930)

== See also ==
- Former German nobility in the Nazi Party
- German Faith Movement
- Germanische Glaubens-Gemeinschaft (GGG) (in German)

== Bibliography ==
- Lionel Gossman: Brownshirt Princess: A Study of the Nazi Conscience. 2009
