= Former German nobility in the Nazi Party =

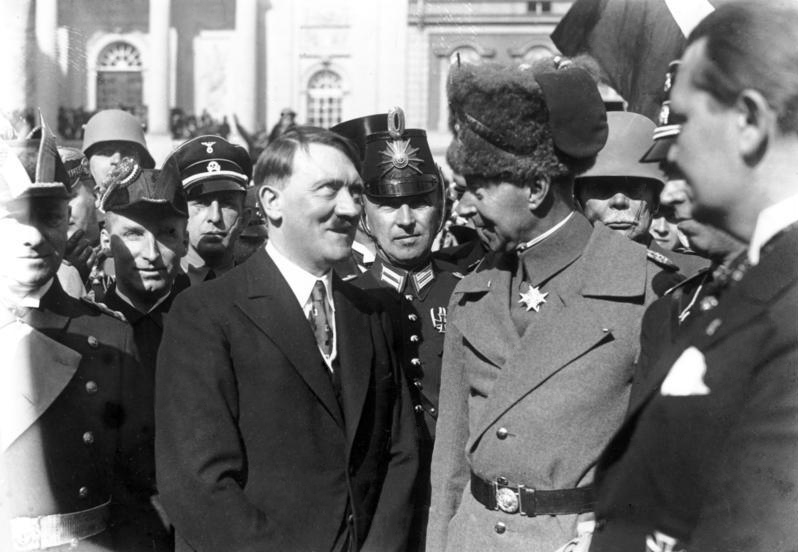
Wilhelm, German Crown Prince and son of Wilhelm II, with Adolf Hitler in March 1933

Beginning in 1925, some members of higher levels of the German nobility joined the Nazi Party, registered by their title, date of birth, NSDAP Party registration number, and date of joining the Party.

Following Kaiser Wilhelm II's abdication and the German Revolution, the German nobility, as a legally defined class, was abolished. On promulgation of the Weimar Constitution on 11 September 1919, all such Germans were declared equal before the law with all persons of formerly lesser rank. There were 22 heads of these former federal states: 4 German kings—of Prussia, Bavaria, Saxony, and Württemberg—6 grand dukes, 5 dukes, and 7 princes, who—along with all of their families—lost their titles and domains. Adolf Hitler, Hermann Goering, Heinrich Himmler, and other Nazi leaders frequently appealed to these former princes, and especially to Wilhelm II and his family, by expressing sympathy for a restoration of the abolished monarchies and other such lost inheritances.

From 1925, the newly formed Nazi Party began accepting these princes by their (abolished) former titles, and by their (abolished) princedoms, and registering these dukes, princes, and princesses as such, in the Nazi Party. There are two known Nazi Party lists of such princes and principalities. Of the first list Historian Malinowski notes: "of 312 families of the old aristocracy 3,592 princes joined the Nazis (26.9%) before Hitler came to power in 1933." The second, in the Berlin Federal archives, lists 270 princely members of the Nazi Party (1928–1942), of which almost half joined the Nazis pre-Hitler. The Berlin list named 90 direct senior heirs, to their 22 abolished principalities, and also included claimants to the (former) Imperial Crown of Wilhelm II.

After the proposed "fourth Kaiser" died fighting as a member of the Wehrmacht in 1940, Hitler issued the Prinzenerlass, prohibiting German princes from serving in the Wehrmacht, but not from the Nazi Party or its paramilitary units, the Sturmabteilung (SA) or the Schutzstaffel (SS). Some German states provided a proportionally higher number of SS officers, including Hesse-Nassau and Lippe. Such princes included SS–Obergruppenführer and Higher SS and Police Leader Josias, Hereditary Prince of Waldeck and Pyrmont.

== German Empire and Kingdom of Prussia ==
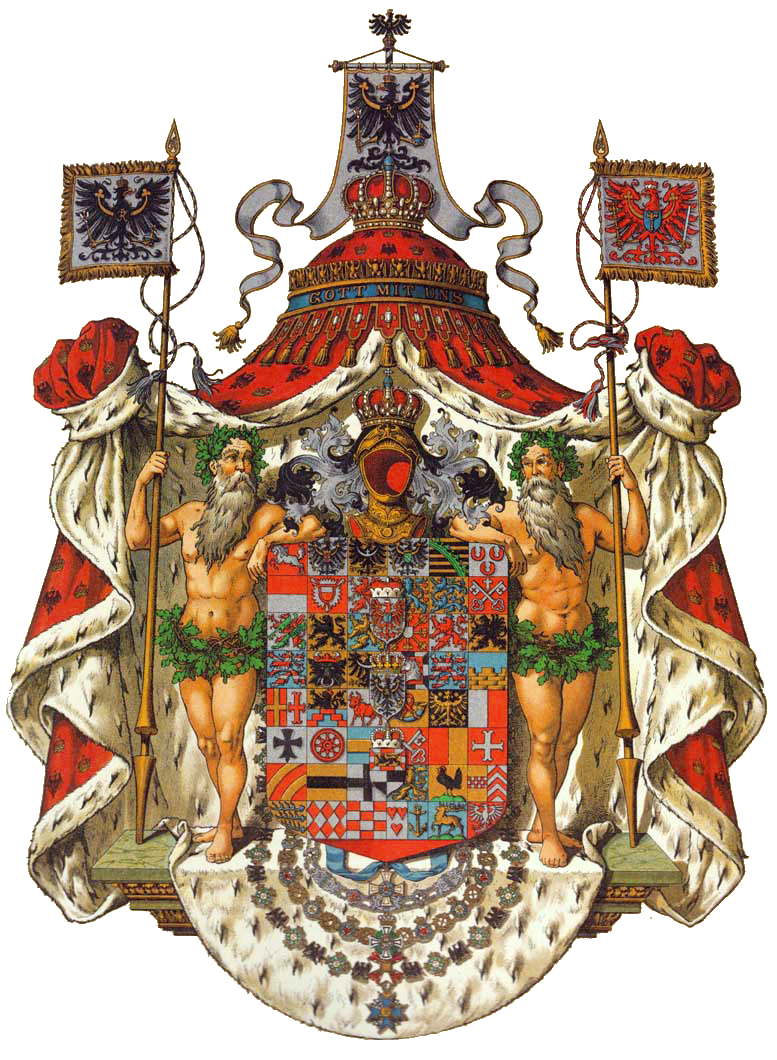
Coat of arms of Prussia as part of the German Empire

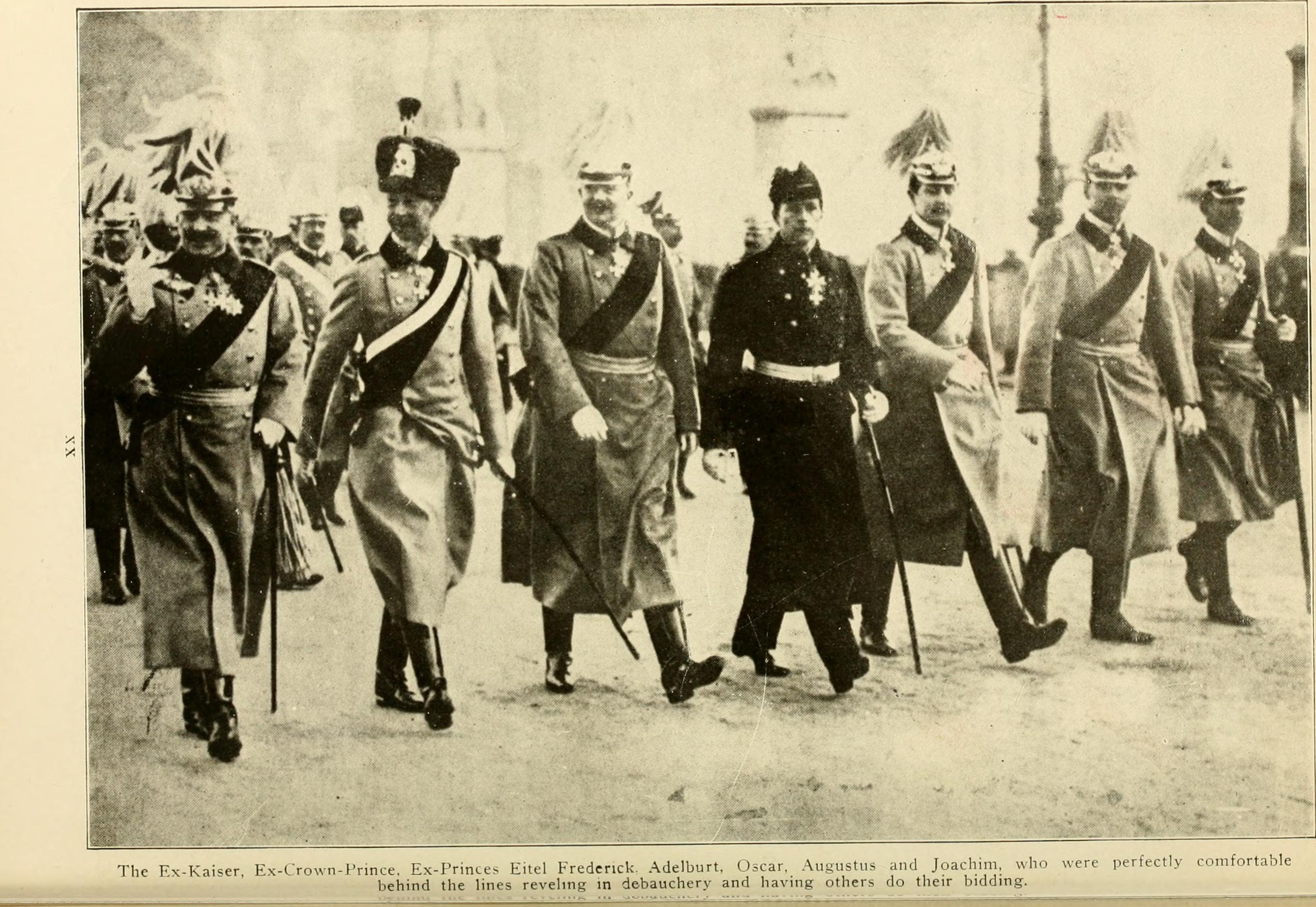
Former Emperor Wilhelm II with his six sons

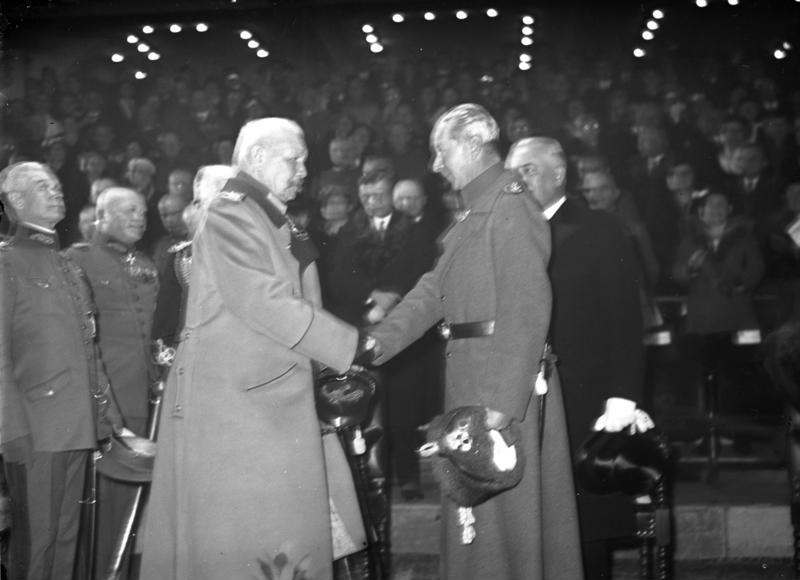
Crown Prince Wilhelm, Reich President von Hindenburg, and von Mackensen, 19 January 1933. Field Marshal von Mackensen, a monarchist, was a military tutor to Wilhelm II, and his son. His high-profile black Life Hussars uniform was adopted by the SS. Von Mackensen was made a Prussian state councillor by Göring in 1933.

Wilhelm II, German Emperor issued his statement of abdication as German Emperor on 9 November 1918. This was followed on 28 November by his abdication as King of Prussia, thus formally ending the House of Hohenzollern's 400-year rule over Prussia. He also gave up his, and his family's, future succession rights to the throne of Prussia and to the German imperial throne.

Wilhelm, German Crown Prince was first son and heir of Kaiser Wilhelm II. The Crown Prince is known to have abdicated around the same time as his father in 1918. Prince Wilhelm was a military commander, second in command to his commander-in-chief father, and served with Generalfeldmarschall Crown Prince Rupprecht of Bavaria and Generalfeldmarschall Albrecht, Duke of Württemberg, at German military headquarters throughout World War I, until the armistice of 11 November 1918. As such, Wilhelm II and Crown Prince Wilhelm directly commanded their chief of the General Staff, Generalfeldmarschall Paul von Hindenburg, throughout the war. During the war, Crown Prince Wilhelm awarded the Iron Cross, first class, to the future leading Nazi Hermann Göring, after Göring flew reconnaissance and bombing missions in the Feldflieger Abteilung 25 (FFA 25) in the Crown Prince's Fifth Army.

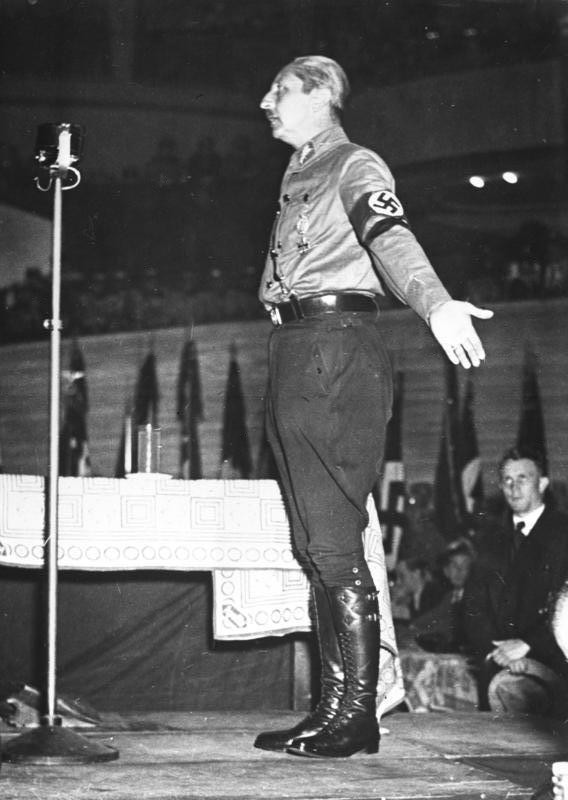
Prince August Wilhelm in 1932

In the early 1930s, Wilhelm II apparently hoped the successes of the German Nazi Party would stimulate interest in a restoration of the monarchy, with Crown Prince Wilhelm's son as the "fourth Kaiser". In 1933, Hindenburg, now Reich President of the Weimar Republic, appointed Nazi Party leader Adolf Hitler as the Chancellor of Germany. Crown Prince Wilhelm was a member of the Stahlhelm, the conservative and nationalist veterans organization, which in 1931 had joined with the Nazis to form the Harzburg Front. Hitler visited the former Crown Prince at Cecilienhof three times, in 1926, in 1933 (on the "Day of Potsdam"), and in 1935. On Hindenburg's death in August 1934, Hitler officially abolished the presidency and became German head of state as Führer, as well as Reich chancellor. This effectively forestalled the hopes of a Hohenzollern restoration at that time.

Prince Wilhelm of Prussia, the son of Crown Prince Wilhelm, nominated by Wilhelm as the "fourth Kaiser", took part in the invasion of France in May 1940. He was wounded during the fighting in Valenciennes and died on 26 May. His funeral service drew over 50,000 mourners. His death and the ensuing sympathy of the German public toward a member of the former German royal house greatly bothered Hitler, and he began to see the Hohenzollerns as a threat to his power. In 1940, Hitler issued the Prinzenerlass, which prohibited princes from German royal houses from serving in the Wehrmacht.

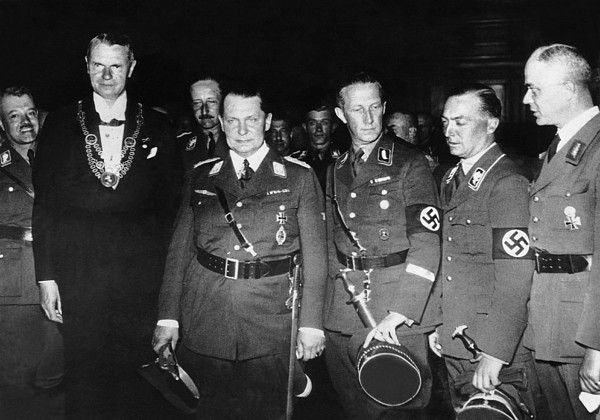
Gathering of high-ranking Nazi officials in Berlin in 1933. Left to right: Georg von Detten (NB) (chief of the Political Office of SA Supreme Command), Heinrich Sahm (Lord Mayor of Berlin), August Wilhelm of Prussia (SA-Group Leader), Hermann Göring (Minister President of Prussia), Julius Lippert (Berlin State Commissioner), Karl Ernst, (Commander of the Berlin SA) and Artur Görlitzer (Deputy Gauleiter of Berlin). NB: Hitler personally named von Detten with the Victims of the Night of the Long Knives.

Prince August Wilhelm of Prussia was the fourth son of Emperor Wilhelm II by his first wife, Augusta Victoria. He joined the Nazi Party on 1 April 1930 and was honored by being granted the low Nazi Party membership number 24. In April 1932, he was elected as a Nazi deputy to the Landtag of Prussia. At the 5 March 1933 election, he was elected as a deputy to the national Reichstag from electoral constituency 4, Potsdam I. In July, he was made a member of the Prussian State Council by Göring, now the minister-president of Prussia. As perhaps the most prominent member of the Hohenzollerns in the Nazi Party, the former prince hoped that Hitler would one day elevate him or his son Alexander Ferdinand to the vacant throne. A member of the Nazi paramilitary organization, the Sturmabteilung (SA), August Wilhelm was promoted to SA-Obergruppenführer, the second highest SA rank, in June 1939.

After the 1941 death of Prince August Wilhelm's father, the former Kaiser, and more so after making derogatory remarks about Reichsminister Joseph Goebbels, Prince August Wilhelm was denounced in 1942, sidelined, and banned from making public speeches. In February 1945, with former Crown Princess Cecilie, August Wilhelm fled the approaching Red Army to take refuge with his aunt Princess Margaret of Prussia in Kronberg. Arrested and imprisoned after the end of the war, he faced a denazification trial in 1948. He was sentenced to thirty months at hard labour but was released on the basis of time served. He died on 25 March 1949.

Prince Alexander Ferdinand was the only son of Prince August Wilhelm and his wife Princess Alexandra Victoria. Like his father, he hoped that Hitler would one day elevate him, or his son, to the vacant throne of the Kaiser. Their support for the Nazis caused disagreements among the Hohenzollerns, with Wilhelm II urging them both to leave the Nazi Party. In 1933, Prince Alexander Ferdinand quit the SA and became a private in the German Army. In 1934, Berlin reported that the prince quit the SA because Hitler had chosen the 21-year-old to succeed him as "head man in Germany when he [Hitler] no longer can carry the torch". The report also said that Göring, harboring his own ambitions for the succession, was expected to oppose the prince's nomination. In 1939, Prince Alexander Ferdinand was an Oberleutnant in the Luftwaffe signal corps. Unlike many princes distrusted and removed from their commands by Hitler, he was the only Hohenzollern allowed to remain in his post.

NSDAP	Nazi Party	Military/ Paramilitary unit	Title and name	Royal house	Prussian princes in the Nazi Party
NSDAP – 24	Joined: 1 April 1930		Prince August Wilhelm of Prussia	Prussia	Born 29 January 1887. Prince August Wilhelm of Prussia was the fourth son of Wilhelm II, German Emperor by his first wife, Augusta Victoria of Schleswig-Holstein. Prince August Wilhelm joined the NSDAP on 1 April 1930, with the low membership number 24. In 1931, he was accepted into the SA with the rank of SA-Standartenführer, rising to SA-Obergruppenführer by June 1939. Prince August Wilhelm hoped that Hitler would one day elevate him or his son Alexander Ferdinand to the vacant throne.
NSDAP – 534782	Joined: 1 May 1931		Prince Alexander Ferdinand of Prussia	Prussia	Born 26 December 1912. Prince Alexander Ferdinand of Prussia was the son of Prince August Wilhelm and Princess Alexandra Victoria. In 1933, Prince Alexander Ferdinand left the SA and became a private in the German Army. As of November 1939, he was an Oberleutnant in the Luftwaffe signal corps, stationed in Wiesbaden.
NSDAP – 2407422	Joined: 1 May 1935		Prince Karl Franz of Prussia	Prussia	Born 15 December 1916. Prince Karl Franz was the only child born to the Kaiser's youngest son Prince Joachim of Prussia and his wife Princess Marie-Auguste of Anhalt. In World War II, Karl Franz served as a Leutnant in an armoured car division, and at one point was stationed on the Polish front. He was awarded the Iron Cross.

== Kingdom of Bavaria ==
House of Wittelsbach
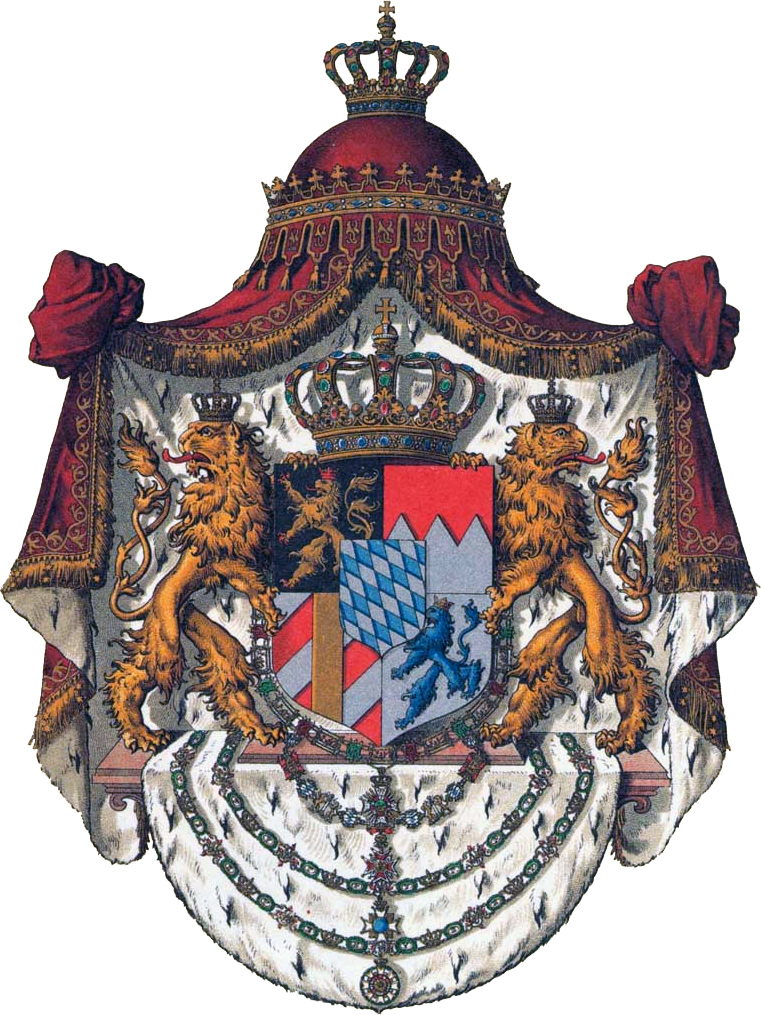
- Titles: King of Bavaria; King of Denmark; King of Sweden; King of Norway; King of Greece

King Ludwig III may have been Hitler's first association with the imperial nobility. At the outbreak of World War I, Ludwig III received a petition from Adolf Hitler, asking for permission to join the Royal Bavarian Army. The petition was granted and Hitler joined the army, where he served for the remainder of World War I.

As the war drew to a close, the German Revolution broke out in Bavaria, and Ludwig III was the first imperial monarch to be deposed. On 7 November 1918, King Ludwig fled from Munich with his family to Anif Palace, near Salzburg. On 12 November 1918, King Ludwig gave Prime Minister Dandl the Anif declaration, releasing all government officials, soldiers, and civil officers from their oath of loyalty to him. The republican government of Kurt Eisner declared the Wittelsbachs deposed, ending 700 years of Wittelsbacher rule over Bavaria.

Rupprecht, Crown Prince of Bavaria, Ludwig's son and heir, did not join the far right in Germany, despite Hitler's attempts to win him over through Ernst Röhm and promises of royal restoration. Rupprecht opposed Hitler, but a plan to give Rupprecht dictatorial powers in Bavaria under the title of Staatskommissar, attracted support from a wide coalition of parties, even including the Social Democratic Party of Germany and Wilhelm Hoegner. However, the hesitancy of the Bavarian government under Minister-President Heinrich Held and Hitler's assumption of power in January 1933 ended all hopes for the idea. Rupprecht continued to harbor the idea of the "restoration of the Bavarian monarchy", in a possible union with Austria as an independent Southern Germany.

In a 1943 memorandum, Prince Rupprecht even mentioned his ambition for the German crown (of the German Empire), which had been held by the House of Wittelsbach in the past.

== Kingdom of Saxony ==
House of Wettin
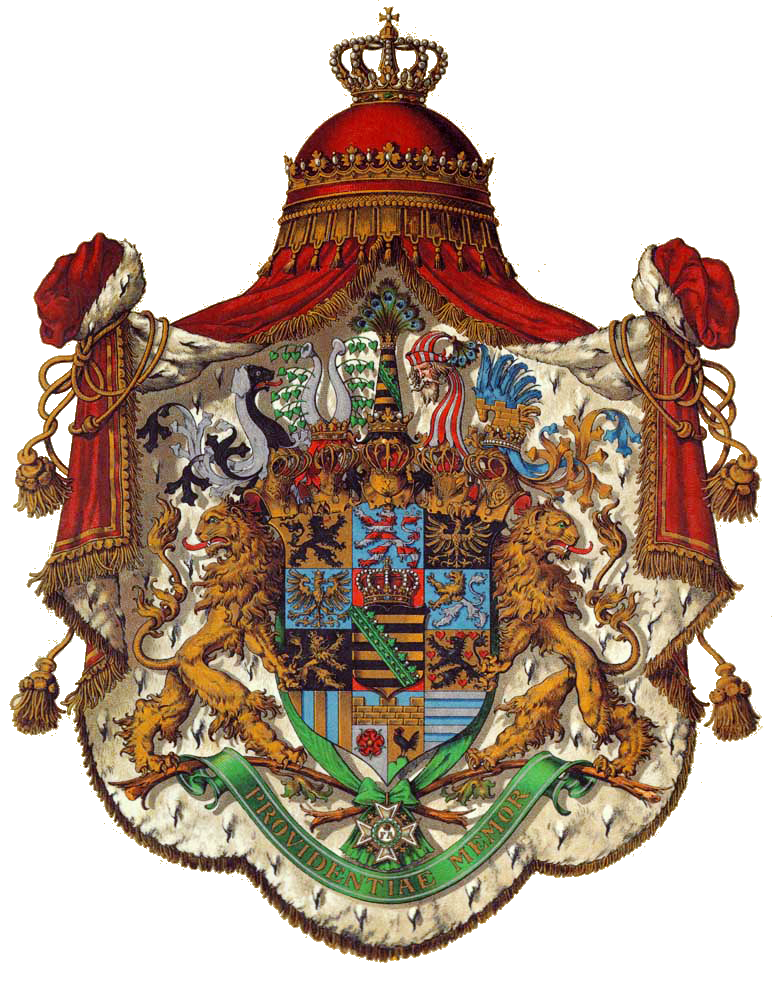

- Prince Georg
- Titles: King of Saxony; King of Poland and Grand Duke of Lithuania; Duke of Warsaw; Monarch of the United Kingdom and the British Empire; Emperor of India; King of Bulgaria; Monarch of Portugal and the Algarves; King of the Belgians

King Frederick Augustus III of Saxony was the last King of Saxony and a member of the House of Wettin. He voluntarily abdicated as King on 13 November 1918. When the German Republic was proclaimed in 1918, he was asked by telephone whether he would abdicate willingly. He said: "Oh, well, I suppose I'd better." Upon abdicating, he is supposed to have said Nu da machd doch eiern Drägg alleene! (Saxon for "Well then do your shit by yourselves!"). When cheered by a crowd in a railroad station several years after his abdication, he stuck his head out of the train's window and shouted, "You're a fine lot of republicans, I'll say!" After his father's abdication in 1919, Georg, Crown Prince of Saxony, the king's first-born son and heir, renounced his rights to the Saxon throne to become a Catholic priest. This was very controversial among people who hoped that the monarchy might one day be restored. He worked in Berlin where he was credited with protecting Jews from the Nazi regime, notably in contrast to his pro-Nazi brothers-in-law, Prince Frederich of Hohenzollern and Prince Franz Joseph of Hohenzolllern-Emden, who joined the SS. As a leading Roman Catholic nobleman and near-relative of the Habsburg, Bourbon, and Saxon dynasties, Prince Franz Joseph did much to lend respectability to the Nazi party.

== Kingdom of Württemberg ==
Coat of arms of Württemberg

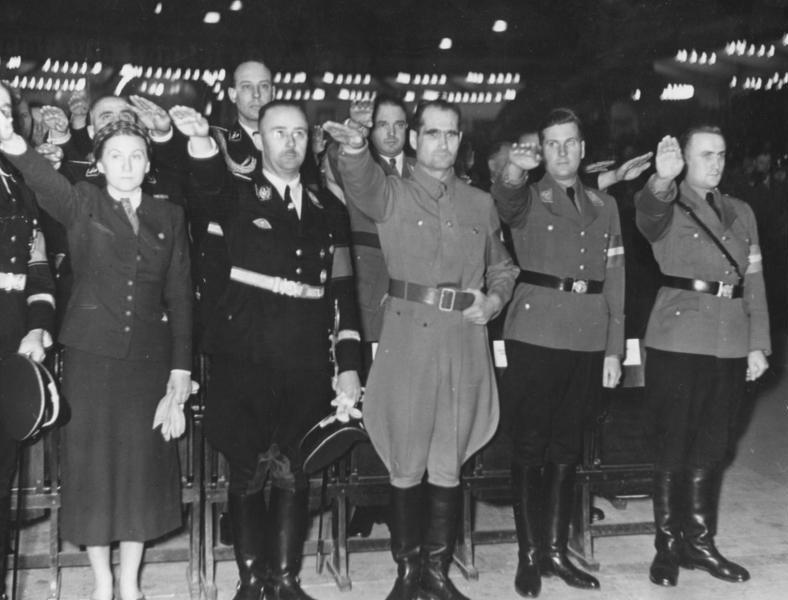
Gertrud Scholtz-Klink, Heinrich Himmler, Rudolf Hess, Baldur von Schirach, and Artur Axmann. Hitler Youth Rally 13 February 1939.

King William II of Wurttemberg abdicated on 30 November 1918. Princess Pauline was the elder daughter of William II and was a first cousin of Queen Wilhelmina of the Netherlands; Princess Alice, Countess of Athlone; and senior Nazi Party members Charles Edward, Duke of Saxe-Coburg and Gotha and Josias, Hereditary Prince of Waldeck and Pyrmont. Princess Pauline was later indicted by a United States Military Government court for "having concealed two prominent Nazis since October 1945". The princess admitted "having deliberately provided a haven" for Gertrud Scholtz-Klink and her husband, former Major General August Heissmayer of the SS. The Princess had acknowledged knowing that "Scholtz-Klink was known as the chief of all Nazi women's organizations", but she denied awareness of Heissmayer's SS position. Scholtz-Klink told the authorities that she did not know whether "Adolf Hitler was alive or dead", but "as long as he lives in the hearts of his followers, he cannot die."

NSDAP	Nazi Party	Military rank	Title and name	Royal house	Württemberg princes and princesses in the Nazi Party
NSDAP – 3726902	Joined: 1 April 1936		Ernst II, Prince of Hohenlohe-Langenburg	Hohenlohe-Langenburg	Born 13 June 1863. Ernst was the son, of Hermann, Prince of Hohenlohe-Langenburg, and Princess Leopoldine of Baden, daughter of Prince William of Baden. He married Queen Victoria's granddaughter, Princess Alexandra of Edinburgh, daughter of The Prince Alfred, Duke of Saxe-Coburg and Gotha and Duke of Edinburgh and Grand Duchess Maria Alexandrovna. Prince Ernst was the Regent of the Duchy of Saxe-Coburg and Gotha during the minority of his wife's cousin, Duke Charles Edward.
NSDAP – 4969451	Joined: 1 May 1937		Princess Alexandra of Saxe-Coburg and Gotha	Hohenlohe-Langenburg	Born 1 September 1878. Princess Sandra was the fourth child and third daughter of Alfred, Duke of Edinburgh and Grand Duchess Maria Alexandrovna of Russia. She was the wife of Ernst II.
NSDAP – 4023070	Joined: 1 May 1937		Gottfried, Prince of Hohenlohe-Langenburg	Hohenlohe-Langenburg	Born 24 March 1897. Gottfried was the son of Prince Ernst II. After 1918, Gottfried continued to serve as a leader of the European aristocracy. He served in the German army in World War II, becoming severely injured at the Russian front. He was dismissed from the army after the abortive attempt on Adolf Hitler's life on 20 July 1944. In 1931, Prince Gottfried married Princess Margarita of Greece and Denmark, the sister of Prince Philip, Duke of Edinburgh, in 1947 he became brother-in-law to Elizabeth II.

Unknown Württemberg nobility
NSDAP	Nazi Party	Military rank	Title and name	Royal house	Unknown Württemberg princes and princesses in the Nazi Party
NSDAP – 1234146	Joined: 1 August 1932		Prince Albert Albrecht of Hohenlohe-Bartenstein	Hohenlohe-Bartenstein	Born 9 March 1906. Prince Albert Albrecht of Hohenlohe-Bartenstein and Jagstberg, was born in Württemberg, son of Johannes, VIII and Archduchess Anna Maria Theresia of Austria. The husband of Countess Therese of Hohenlohe.
NSDAP – 1331054	Joined: 1 September 1932		Princess Lahmann Mariella of Hohenlohe-Oehringen	Hohenlohe-Oehringen	Born 31 August 1900. Countess Maria-Gabrielle (Mariella) Hedwig von Faber-Castell. On 1 May 1935, she married Prince Max Hugo Paul Friedrich Karl Egon zu Hohenlohe-Oehringen (1893–1951).
NSDAP – 1359811	Joined: 1 November 1932		Prince Carl of Hohenlohe-Bartenstein	Hohenlohe-Bartenstein	Born 20 October 1905. Carl, Prince of Hohenlohe-Bartenstein, was husband of Clara, Baroness von Meyern-Hohenberg, married 7 November 1912.
NSDAP – 3587919	Joined: 1 May 1933		Princess Alexandra of Hohenlohe-Langenburg	Hohenlohe-Langenburg	Born 22 April 1902. Daughter of Ernst II. Princess Alexandra of Hohenlohe-Langenburg (2 April 1901 – 26 October 1963).
NSDAP – 1891373	Joined: 1 May 1933		Prince Friedrich of Hohenlohe-Bartenstein	Hohenlohe-Bartenstein	Born 3 September 1910. Frederick, Prince of Hohenlohe-Bartenstein. Prince Friedrich Hohenlohe-Bartenstein, was the son of Prince Johannes Hohenlohe-Bartenstein (b.1863) of Württemberg, and Princess Anna Austria-Toscana (b.1879) in Bavaria. He was husband of Marie Claire Buet.
NSDAP – 2151756	Joined: 1 May 1933		Prince Max-Hugo of Hohenlohe-Öhringen	Hohenlohe-Oehringen	Born 25 March 1893. Prince Max Hugo of Hohenlohe-Öhringen was the son of Max Anton Karl Prince of Hohenlohe-Öhringen and Helene Gräfin von Hatzfeldt. He married, firstly, Maria-Gabrielle Gräfin von Faber-Castell, daughter of Alexander Friedrich Lothar Graf von Faber-Castell and Sophie Ottilie Gräfin von Faber, divorced 1931. He married, secondly, Hella von Ramin in 1941. He and Hella divorced in 1942. He married, thirdly, Marianne Liselotte Diefenthal. He died on 17 October 1951 in Wurttemberg.
NSDAP – 3409977	Joined: 1 May 1933		(Prince) Grand Duke Karl Alexander of Saxe-Weimar-Eisenach	Hohenlohe-Saxe-Weimar-Eisenach	Born 31 July 1908. "According to His Royal Highest resolution. Highness graciously reigning Grand Duke Karl Alexander of Saxe-Weimar-Eisenach from March 16, 1892 granted the rights of a legal personality".
NSDAP – 1787117	Joined: 1 July 1933		Prince Friedrich Karl Kraft	Hohenlohe	Born 16 March 1892. Prince Friedrich Karl KRAFT, born in Dresden (d. 2 September 1965), was a son of Prince Hans Heinrich Georg, Prince of Hohenlohe-Oehringen, Duke of Ujest and Princess Gertrud Auguste Mathilde Olga von Hohenlohe-Öhringen. Died with his wife Florence Nina Chischina (1898–1965), in Rome, of wounds received in a car crash.
NSDAP – 3508258	Joined: 1 January 1936		Prince Rudolph of Hohenlohe	Hohenlohe	Born 1 December 1903.
NSDAP – 5637217	Joined: 1 May 1937		Princess Hella of Hohenlohe	Hohenlohe-Oehringen	Born 25 February 1883. Princess Hela was the wife of Prince Max-Hugo. Hella von Ramin was born on 25 February 1883. She was the daughter of Paul von Ramin and Gunhild von Ramin-Daber. She married, (third husband) Prince Max-Hugo in 1941. She and Max-Hugo divorced in 1942. She died on 7 January 1943.
NSDAP – 4453767	Joined: 1 May 1937		Princess Irma of Hohenlohe-Langenburg	Hohenlohe-Langenburg	Born 4 July 1902. Daughter of Ernst II. Princess Irma of Hohenlohe-Langenburg (4 July 1902 – 8 March 1986).
NSDAP – 5371558	Joined: 1 May 1937		Prince Hugo Felix August zu Hohenlohe-Oehringen	Hohenlohe-Oehringen	Born 28 April 1890. Prince Hugo Felix August zu Hohenlohe-Oehringen, was son of Prince Hans Heinrich Georg, Prince of Hohenlohe-Oehringen, Duke of Ujest and Princess Gertrud Auguste Mathilde Olga von Hohenlohe-Öhringen. He was husband of Valerie von Carstanjen and Ursula von Zedlitz. He was father of Princess Alexandra Olga Elsa zu Hohenlohe Ohringen, and Princess Dorothea Elisabeth zu Hohenlohe Ohringen, (d.28 August 1962).
NSDAP – 6294978	Joined: 1 May 1938		Prince Alfred of Hohenlohe-Schillingsfürst	Hohenlohe-Schillingsfürst	Born 31 March 1889. Prince Alfred of Hohenlohe was born in Salzburg, Austria, the son of Konrad, Prinz zu Hohenlohe-Schillingsfürst and Franzisca Countess of Schönborn-Buchheim. He was the husband of Catherine Britton. Father of Konrad zu Hohenlohe-Schillingsfürst. Brother of Franziska Maria Anna von Hohenlohe-Waldenburg-Schillingsfürst. He died on 21 October 1948 in Prestwick, South Ayrshire, Scotland, United Kingdom.
NSDAP – 6580922	Joined: 1 December 1938		Prince Karl of Hohenlohe	Hohenlohe	Born 1 December 1903.
NSDAP – 6580933	Joined: 1 December 1938		Prince Gottfried Constantin of Hohenlohe-Langenburg	Hohenlohe-Langenburg	Born 11 September 1893. Gottfried Constantin of Hohenlohe-Langenburg was the son of Kuk privy councilor Prince Gottfried Karl Joseph and Anna von Schönborn-Buchheim. In WWII, Constantin was adjutant of the Supreme Commander in Belgium. After June 1944, he was assigned as head of the military administration in Estonia. Captain Hohenlohe was later fired from the Wehrmacht.
NSDAP – 6510492	Joined: 1 December 1938		Princess Viktoria of Hohenlohe	Hohenlohe	Born 20 October 1914.

== Grand Duchy of Baden ==
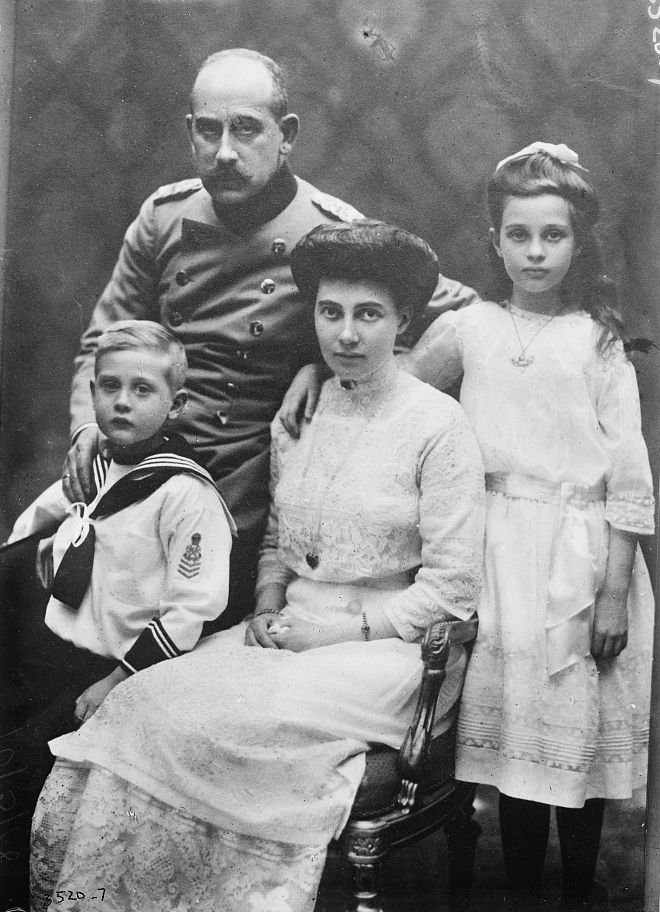
Prince Maximilian

Frederick II, Grand Duke of Baden abdicated on 22 November 1918, during the German Revolution of 1918–19 which resulted in the abolition of the Grand Duchy. After his death in 1928, the headship of the house was transferred over to his great uncle's grandson, Prince Maximilian of Baden. His successor Prince Maximilian, was the Chancellor of Germany and Minister President of Prussia, and the chief negotiator of the Kaiserreich abdication. Prince Max was married to Princess Marie Louise of Hanover, eldest daughter of Ernest Augustus II and Thyra of Denmark. Prince Max's son Prince Berthold of Baden married Princess Theodora, daughter of Prince Andrew of Greece and Denmark and Princess Alice of Battenberg. As such, Prince Berthold was brother-in-law to Prince Philip, Duke of Edinburgh, and eventually Elizabeth II. In 1920, with Kurt Hahn, Prince Max established the Schule Schloss Salem school attended by Prince Philip. Kurt Hahn also founded Gordonstoun, in Scotland, which was attended by Philip's heir, Prince Charles.

== Grand Duchy of Hesse ==
House of Hesse
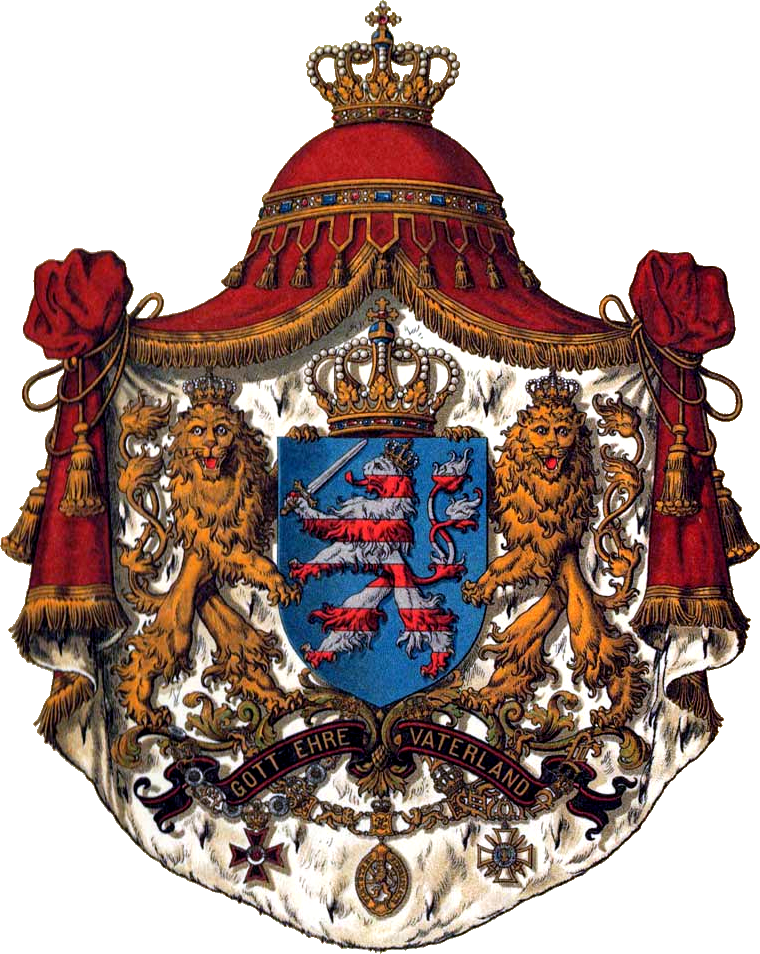
- Titles: Grand Duke of Hesse and by Rhine; King of Sweden; King of Finland
- Cadet branches: Hesse-Kassel; Hesse-Philippsthal-Barchfeld; Battenberg (Mountbatten); Hanau-Schaumburg

Prince Frederick Charles of Hesse was the brother-in-law of the German Emperor Wilhelm II. He was elected as King of Finland by the Parliament of Finland on 9 October 1918. However, with the abdication of Emperor Wilhelm II of Germany ending monarchies in Germany, Finland adopted a republican constitution. His first son Philipp, Landgrave of Hesse, joined the Nazi Party (NSDAP) in 1930, and the SA Stormtroopers in 1932. In 1933, Philipp's three brothers joined the SS and the SA. Philipp became a particularly close friend of Hermann Göring, the future head of the Luftwaffe. After Hindenburg's appointment of Adolf Hitler as Chancellor in 1933, Philipp was appointed Oberpräsident (Governor) of Hesse-Nassau, a member of the Reichstag, and of the Prussian Staatsrat. Philipp played an important role in the consolidation of Nazi rule in Germany. He introduced other aristocrats to NSDAP officials and, as son-in-law of the King of Italy, was a frequent go-between for Hitler and Benito Mussolini. As Governor of Hesse-Kassel, Philipp was complicit in the T-4 Euthanasia Program. In February 1941, Philipp signed the contract placing the sanitarium of Hadamar Clinic at the disposal of the Reich Interior Ministry. Over 10,000 mentally ill people were murdered there. In 1946, Prince Philipp of Hesse was charged with murder, but the charges were later dropped.

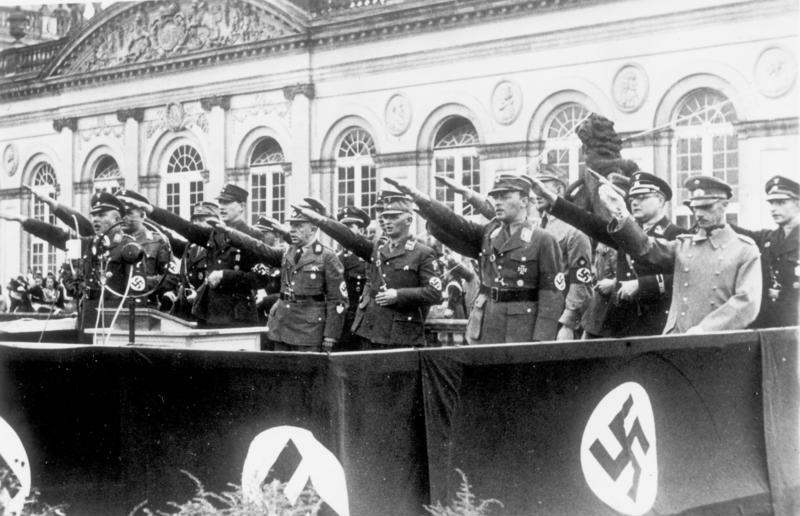
Philip of Hesse, second from right in first row. Kassel, 1933

Prince Frederick's other son, Prince Christoph of Hesse, was an SS officer. Christophe was a director in the Ministry of Aviation, Commander of the Air Reserves, with the rank of Oberführer in the SS. In 1943, he was killed in an airplane accident in a war zone near Italy. Prince Christoph was a great-grandson of Queen Victoria and Prince Albert of Saxe-Coburg and Gotha through their daughter Victoria, Princess Royal, wife of Frederick III, German Emperor. Christoph married Princess Sophie of Greece and Denmark. Princess Sophie was the youngest daughter of Prince Andrew of Greece and Denmark and Princess Alice of Battenberg, and the sister of the future Prince Philip, Duke of Edinburgh.

Prince Wilhelm of Hesse was heir to the Hesse-Philippsthal line. Prince Wilhelm was the eldest child of Prince Chlodwig of Hesse and Princess Caroline of Solms-Hohensolms-Lich. In 1932, he joined the Nazi Party and the SS, rising to the rank of Hauptsturmführer. Prince Wilhelm married Princess Marianne, the daughter of Prince Friedrich Wilhelm of Prussia. During World War II Prince Wilhelm refused to join an SS unit, instead switching to the regular German Army, where he became a captain of infantry. He was killed in action during the fighting at Gor on the Eastern Front.

NSDAP	Nazi Party	Military rank	Title and name	Royal house	Hesse princes and princesses in the Nazi Party
NSDAP – 418991	Joined: 1 October 1930		Philipp, Landgrave of Hesse	Hesse	Born 6 November 1896. Philipp was son of Prince Frederick Charles of Hesse and Princess Margaret of Prussia, (sister of Wilhelm II). In 1932, he joined the (SA). In 1933 his brothers joined the (SS) and the (SA). He was a member of Reichstag and Prussian Staatsrat. Through his party membership, Philipp became a particularly close friend of Hermann Göring. He introduced aristocrats to NSDAP officials and, as son-in-law of the King of Italy, he was a go-between for Hitler and Benito Mussolini.
NSDAP – 696176	Joined: 1 November 1931		Prince Christoph of Hesse	Hesse	Born 14 May 1901. Prince Christoph was a director in the Ministry of Aviation, and the Commander of the Air Reserves, and in 1933, held the rank of Oberführer in the SS. Oberführer was a rank of the Nazi Party dating back to 1921. Translated as "senior leader", an Oberführer was a Nazi Party member in charge of a group of paramilitary units in a particular geographical region.
NSDAP – 1187621	Joined: 1 May 1932		Prince Wilhelm of Hesse-Philippsthal-Barchfeld	Hesse-Philippsthal	Born 1 May 1905. In 1932, Prince Wilhelm joined the Nazi party and the SS rising to the rank [[SS-Hauptsturmführer|SS-Hauptsturmführer]]. Prince Wilhelm married Princess Marianne of Prussia. During WWII Prince Wilhelm refused to join an SS unit, instead switching to the regular German Army, where he became a captain of infantry. He was killed in action during the fighting at Gor on the Eastern Front.
NSDAP – 1794944	Joined: 1 May 1932		Prince Wolfgang of Hesse	Hesse-Kassel	Born 6 November 1896. Prince Wolfgang of Hesse-Kassel was the designated Hereditary Prince of the monarchy of Finland (with a pretension to Estonia), and as such, called the Crown Prince of Finland officially until 14 December 1918, and also afterwards by some monarchists.
NSDAP – 7900128	Joined: 1 January 1940		Princess Marie Alexandra of Baden	Hesse-Hesse by Rhine	Born 1 August 1902. Princess Marie was the wife of Prince Wolfgang of Hesse. She was daughter of Prince Maximilian of Baden (1867–1929) and Princess Marie Louise of Hanover and Cumberland. Her paternal grandparents were Prince Wilhelm of Baden (1829–1897) and Princess Maria of Leuchtenberg (1841–1914). Marie Alexandra's grandmother Thyra was a sister of Empress Maria Fedorovna and aunt of Nicholas II of Russia, the last Romanov tsar.
NSDAP – 4628851	Joined: 1 May 1937		Princess Marianne of Prussia	Hesse-Philippsthal	Born 23 August 1913. Princess Marianne was the wife of Prince Wilhelm of Hesse. She was a descendant of King Frederick William III of Prussia and King William I of the Netherlands. She was named after her great-grandmother Princess Marianne of the Netherlands. She was a third cousin of William, German Crown Prince.
NSDAP – 4814689	Joined: 1 May 1938		Prince Frederick Charles of Hesse	Hesse	Born 1 May 1868. In 1893, Frederick Charles married Princess Margaret of Prussia, youngest sister of Wilhelm II and a granddaughter of Queen Victoria of Great Britain. They had six children, including two sets of twins.
NSDAP – 4814690	Joined: 1 May 1938		Princess Margaret of Prussia	Hesse	Born 22 May 1872. Princess Margaret of Prussia was a daughter of Frederick III, German Emperor and Victoria, Princess Royal, and the younger sister of Wilhelm II and a granddaughter of Queen Victoria. She married Prince Frederick Charles, the elected King of Finland, making her the would-be Queen of Finland. In 1926, they became Landgrave and Landgravine of Hesse.

Unknown Hessian nobility
NSDAP	Nazi Party	Military Rank	Title and Name	Royal House	Unknown ? Hesse Princes and Princesses in the Nazi Party
NSDAP – 1184026	Joined: 1 March 1932		Prince Alexis of Hesse-Philippsthal	Hesse-Philippsthal	Born 8 June 1911. Prince Alexis Hesse-Philippsthal-Barchfeld. Was the son of Landgrave Chlodwig Hesse-Philippsthal-Barchfeld, and Princess Karoline Solms-Hohensolms-Lich, b. 27 May 1877, d. 28 Nov 1958, Berlin, West Germany.
NSDAP – 1203662	Joined: 1 August 1932		Prince Richard of Hesse	Hesse	Born 14 May 1901. Prince Richard was the twin brother of Prince Christopher.
NSDAP – 3515493	Joined: 1 May 1933		Princess Victoria Cecile of Hesse-Philippsthal	Hesse-Philippsthal	Born 26 October 1914. Viktoria Cäcilie (1914–1998), Prince Wilhelm and Alexander Friedrich (1911–1939), were the children of Chlodwig, Landgrave of Hesse-Philippsthal-Barchfeld, an officer in the Prussian Army and head of the Hesse-Philippsthal line of the House of Hesse. In the early 1930s three of Landgrave Chlodwig's children (Wilhelm, Alexander Friedrich and Viktoria Cäcilie) joined the Nazi party. His third son Prince Alexander Friedrich, who suffered from epilepsy, was sterilised by the Nazis on 27 September 1938, he died a year later.

== Grand Duchy of Hesse and by Rhine ==
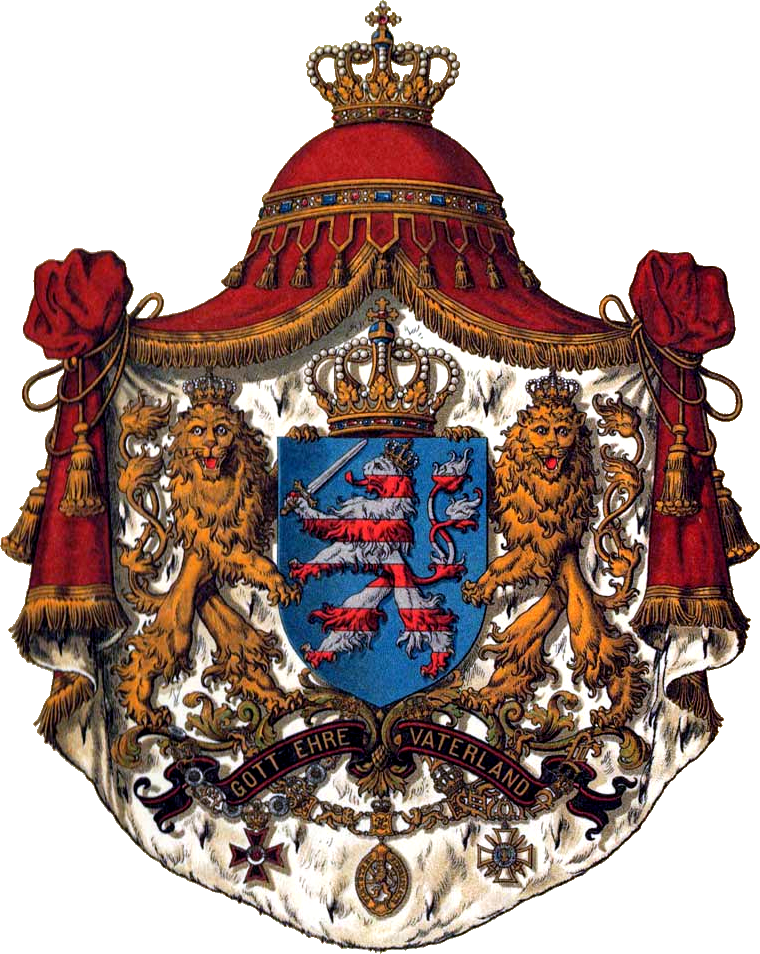
Coat of arms of Hesse

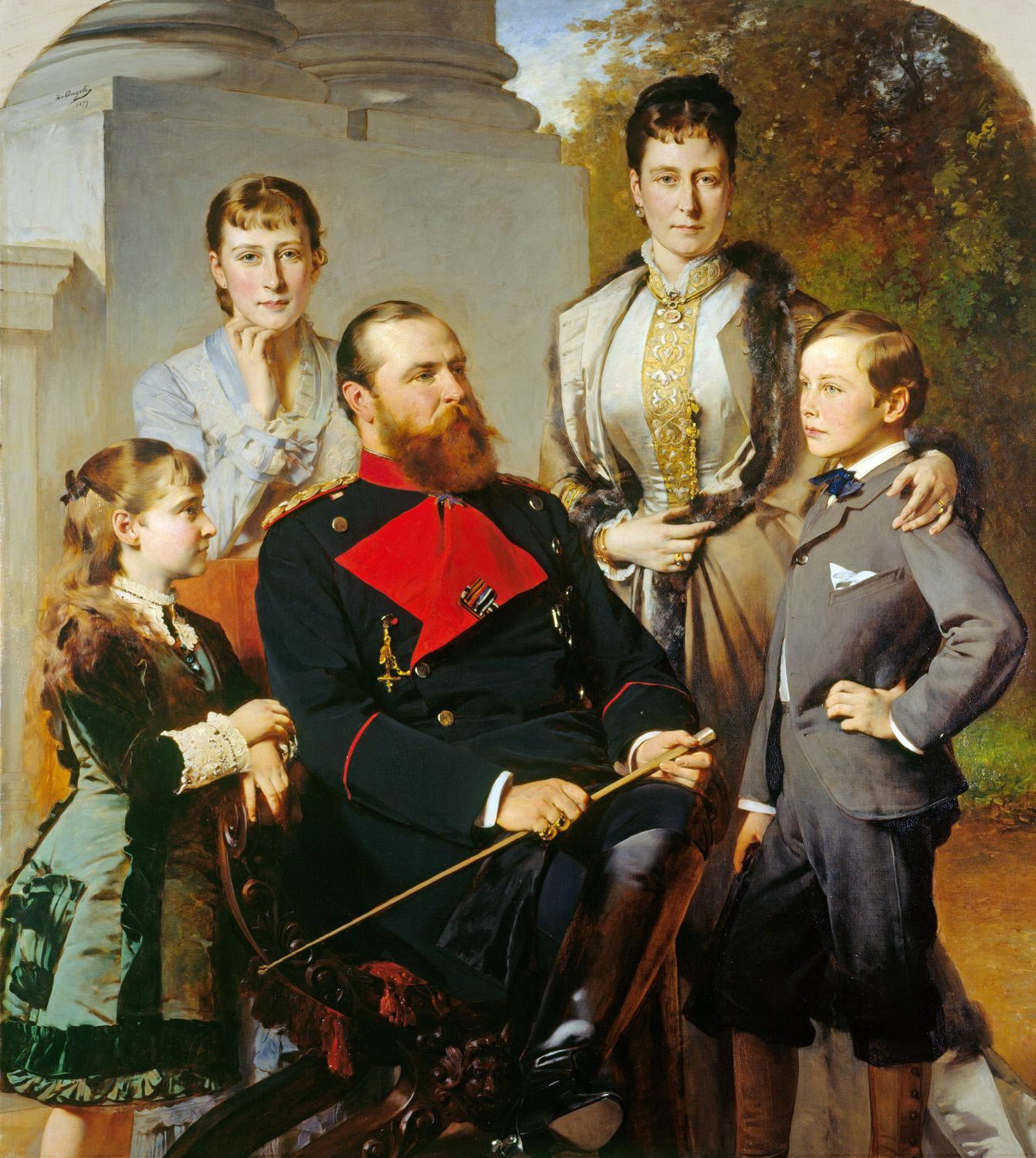
Hesse family

During World War I, Ernest Louis, Grand Duke of Hesse served as an officer at Kaiser Wilhelm's headquarters. In July 1918, roughly sixteen months after the February Revolution, which deposed his brother-in-law, Nicholas II, Ernst's two sisters in Russia, Elizabeth, who had become a nun following the assassination of her husband, Grand Duke Sergei, in 1905, and Alexandra, the former tsarina, were killed by the Bolsheviks. At the end of the war, he lost his throne during the revolution of 1918, after refusing to abdicate. Ernst was the last Grand Duke of Hesse and by Rhine from 1892 until 1918.

NSDAP	Nazi Party	Military rank	Title and name	Royal house	Hesse and by Rhine princes and princesses in the Nazi Party
NSDAP – 3766312	Joined: 1 May 1937		Georg Donatus, Hereditary Grand Duke of Hesse	Hesse	Born 8 November 1906. Hereditary Grand Duke George was husband of Princess Cecilie of Greece and Denmark.
NSDAP – 3766313	Joined: 1 May 1937		Princess Cecilie of Greece and Denmark	Hesse	Born 22 January 1911. Princess Cecilie was a grandchild of King George I of Greece and Grand Duchess Olga Konstantinova of Russia (a granddaughter of Tsar Nicholas I of Russia). She was a great-great-granddaughter of Queen Victoria. Her brother Philip, later Duke of Edinburgh, was the husband of Queen Elizabeth II.
NSDAP – 5900506	Joined: 1 May 1937		Louis, Prince of Hesse and by Rhine	Hesse by Rhine	Born 20 November 1908. Prince Louis of Hesse and by Rhine, was the youngest son of Ernest Louis, Grand Duke of Hesse by his second wife, Princess Eleonore of Solms-Hohensolms-Lich. He succeeded his brother Georg Donatus as the titular Grand Duke of Hesse after his death. He married the Hon. Margaret Campbell-Geddes (1913–1997) daughter of Auckland Campbell-Geddes, 1st Baron Geddes in 1937, on the day after the Sabena OO-AUB Ostend crash. In 1964, he stood as godfather to Prince Edward, Duke of Edinburgh.

== Grand Duchy of Mecklenburg-Schwerin ==
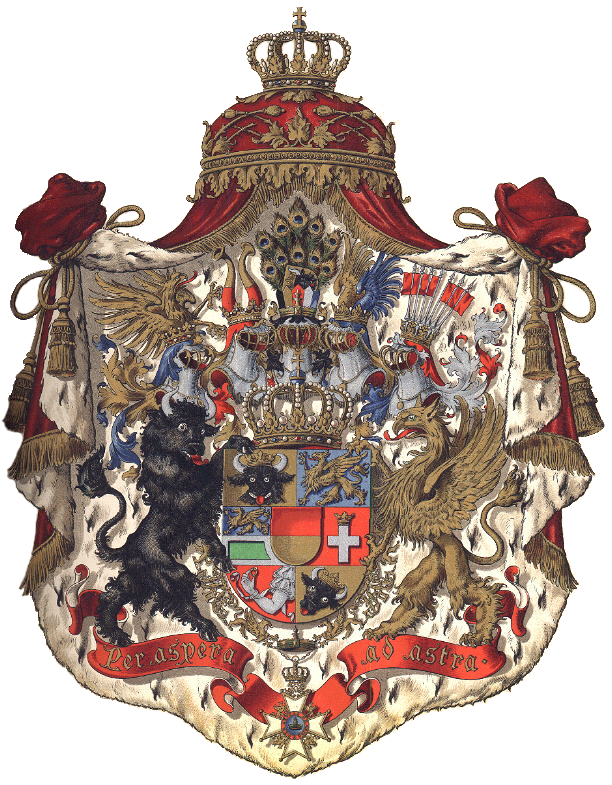
Coat of arms of Mecklenburg-Schwerin

Following the 1918 suicide of Grand Duke Adolphus Frederick VI of Mecklenburg-Strelitz, Frederick Francis IV, Grand Duke of Mecklenburg-Schwerin took up the regency of Strelitz, after the heir presumptive Duke Charles Michael, who was serving in the Russian Army at the time, had indicated that he wished to renounce his succession rights. Friedrich Franz abdicated the grand ducal throne on 14 November 1918 following the German Empire's defeat in World War I; the regency ended at the same time. His son Friedrich Franz joined the SS, and by 1936 held the rank of Hauptsturmführer (Captain). He was posted to Denmark during World War II where he worked at the German embassy as a personal aide to the civilian administrator Werner Best. He spent 1944 serving with the Waffen-SS tank corps. In May 1943, Friedrich Franz was passed over as heir in favour of his younger brother Duke Christian Louis.

NSDAP	Nazi Party	Military rank	Title and name	Royal house	Mecklenburg-Schwerin Grand Dukes in the Nazi Party
NSDAP – 504973	Joined: 1 May 1931		Friedrich Franz, Hereditary Grand Duke of Mecklenburg-Schwerin	Mecklenburg	Born 22 April 1910. Duke Friedrich Franz was the heir apparent to the throne of Mecklenburg-Schwerin, which his father abdicated on 14 November 1918. He was the eldest son of the reigning Grand Duke of Mecklenburg-Schwerin, Frederick Francis IV, and his wife Princess Alexandra of Hanover, a daughter of the Crown Prince of Hanover. Friedrich Franz joined the SS and promoted to Hauptsturmführer (Captain) by 1936. During WWII he worked at the German embassy as a personal aide to Werner Best. He spent 1944 serving with the Waffen-SS tank corps.

== Grand Duchy of Oldenburg ==
House of Oldenburg
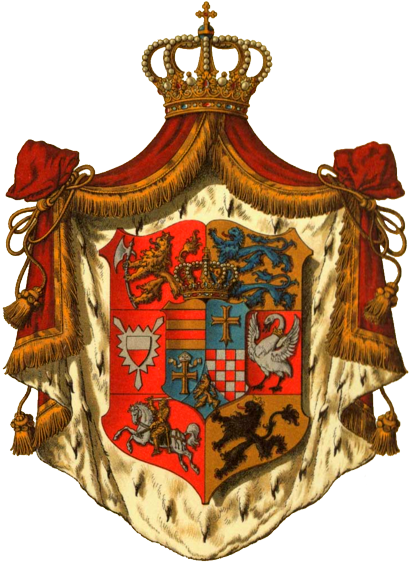
- Titles: Emperor of Russia; King of Denmark; King of Norway; King of Sweden; King of Greece; King of Iceland; Grand Duke of Oldenburg

Frederick Augustus II, Grand Duke of Oldenburg was forced to abdicate his throne at the end of World War I, when the former Grand Duchy of the German Empire joined the post-war German Republic. He and his family took up residence at Rastede Castle, where he took up farming and local industrial interests. A year after his abdication, he asked the Oldenburg Diet for a yearly allowance of 150,000 marks, stating that his financial condition was "extremely precarious". In 1931, Frederick died in Rastede.

NSDAP	Nazi Party	Military rank	Title and name	Royal House	Oldenburg Grand Dukes in the Nazi Party
NSDAP – 4085803	Joined: 1 May 1937		Nikolaus, Hereditary Grand Duke of Oldenburg	Oldenburg	Born on 10 August 1897, Grand Duke Nikolaus was the eldest son of Frederick Augustus II, Grand Duke of Oldenburg, last ruling Grand Duke of Oldenburg. As a first cousin of Queen Juliana of the Netherlands, he was a guest at her 1937 wedding to fellow Nazi Party member, Prince Bernhard of Lippe-Biesterfeld.

== Duchy of Anhalt ==
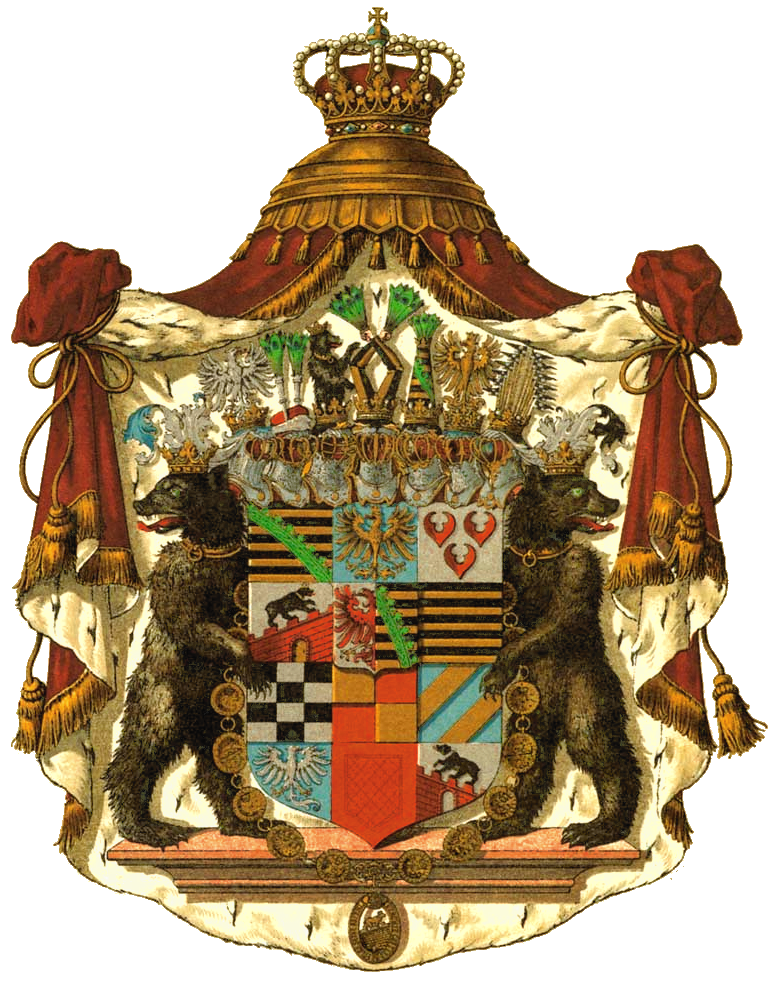
Coat of arms of Anhalt

Joachim Ernst, Duke of Anhalt succeeded his father as Duke of Anhalt on 13 September 1918. However, due to his youth his uncle Prince Aribert of Anhalt was appointed regent. His brief reign came to an end on 12 November 1918 with his uncle abdicating in his name following the German revolution. The duchy became the Free State of Anhalt.

NSDAP	Nazi Party	Military rank	Title and name	Royal house	Anhalt dukes, duchesses and princesses in the Nazi Party
NSDAP – 3452693	Joined: 1 May 1934		Princess Marie-Auguste of Anhalt	Anhalt	Born on 10 June 1898 Princess Marie Auguste was the daughter of Eduard, Duke of Anhalt and Princess Louise Charlotte of Saxe-Altenburg. Marie-Auguste married Prince Joachim of Prussia, the youngest son of German Emperor Wilhelm II. The wedding was attended by Joachim's father Wilhelm II and mother Empress Augusta Viktoria, and the Duke and Duchess of Anhalt, etc. After Joachim committed suicide in 1920, in 1922, Marie-Auguste sued the former Emperor for the financial support promised to her, in her and Joachim's marriage contract.

Unknown Anhalt nobility
NSDAP	Nazi Party	Military rank	Title and name	Royal house	Unknown Anhalt dukes, duchesses and princesses in the Nazi Party
NSDAP – 4843880	Joined: 1 May 1937		Duchess Edda Charlotte of Anhalt	Anhalt	Born 20 August 1905
NSDAP – 7267717	Joined: 1 November 1939		Duke Joachim Ernst of Anhalt	Anhalt	Born 11 January 1901

== Duchy of Brunswick ==
House of Hanover
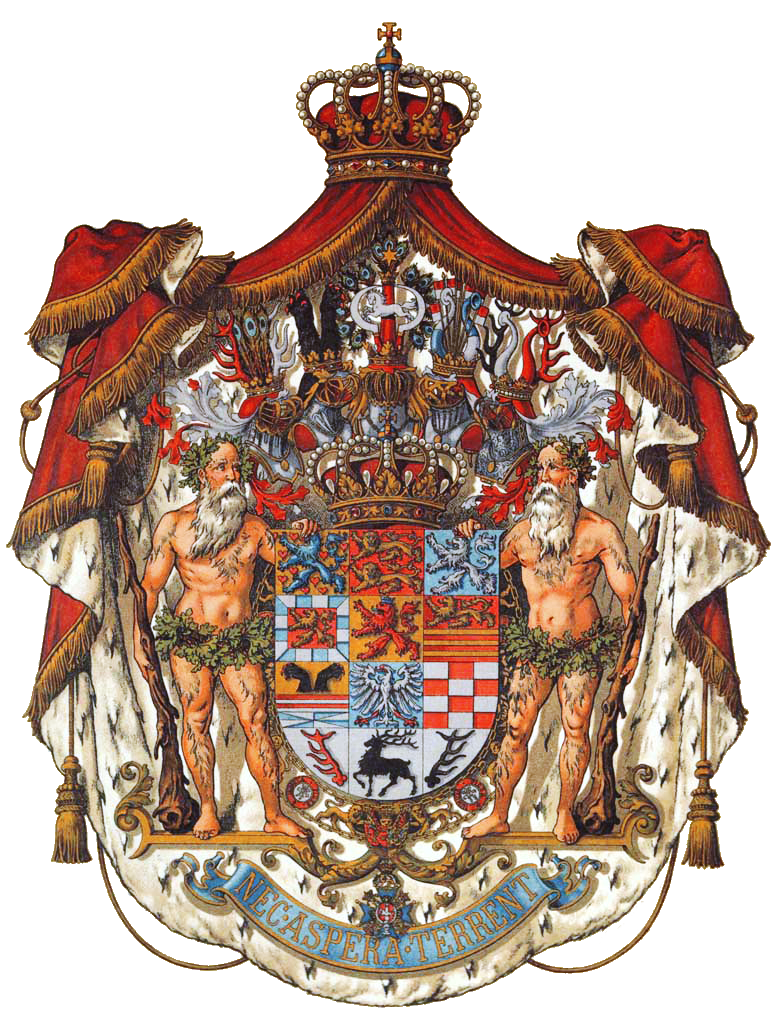
- Parent house: Este → Welf
- Titles: Empress of India; King of Great Britain; King of France; King of Ireland; King of Hanover; Duke of Brunswick; etc.., etc.., etc..

Prince Ernest Augustus, Crown Prince of Hanover, who was also 3rd Duke of Cumberland and Teviotdale, was the only son of George V of Hanover and Marie of Saxe-Altenburg. Although he was the senior male-line great-grandson of George III, he was deprived of his British peerages and honours for having sided with Germany in World War I. Ernest Augustus was the last Hanoverian prince to hold a British royal title. His successor Ernst Augustus, Duke of Brunswick and Prince of Hanover, Prince of Great Britain and Ireland, was Ernest Augustus's youngest child, with Princess Thyra. When Ernest's older brother Prince George died, the German Emperor sent a message of condolence to the Duke. In response, the Duke sent Ernest, his only surviving son, to thank the Emperor. In Berlin, Ernest met Emperor Wilhelm II's only daughter, Princess Victoria Louise of Prussia, and they married in 1913. The wedding was the last great gathering of European sovereigns: the German Emperor and Empress, the Duke and Duchess of Cumberland, George V and Queen Mary of the UK, and Tsar Nicholas II attended. His father's British dukedom was suspended under the Titles Deprivation Act 1917, and, on 8 November 1918, he was forced to abdicate, along with the other German nobility. In 1947, his daughter Frederica became Queen of the Hellenes when her husband Prince Paul of Greece and Denmark succeeded as King. He died in 1953.

== Duchy of Saxe-Altenburg ==
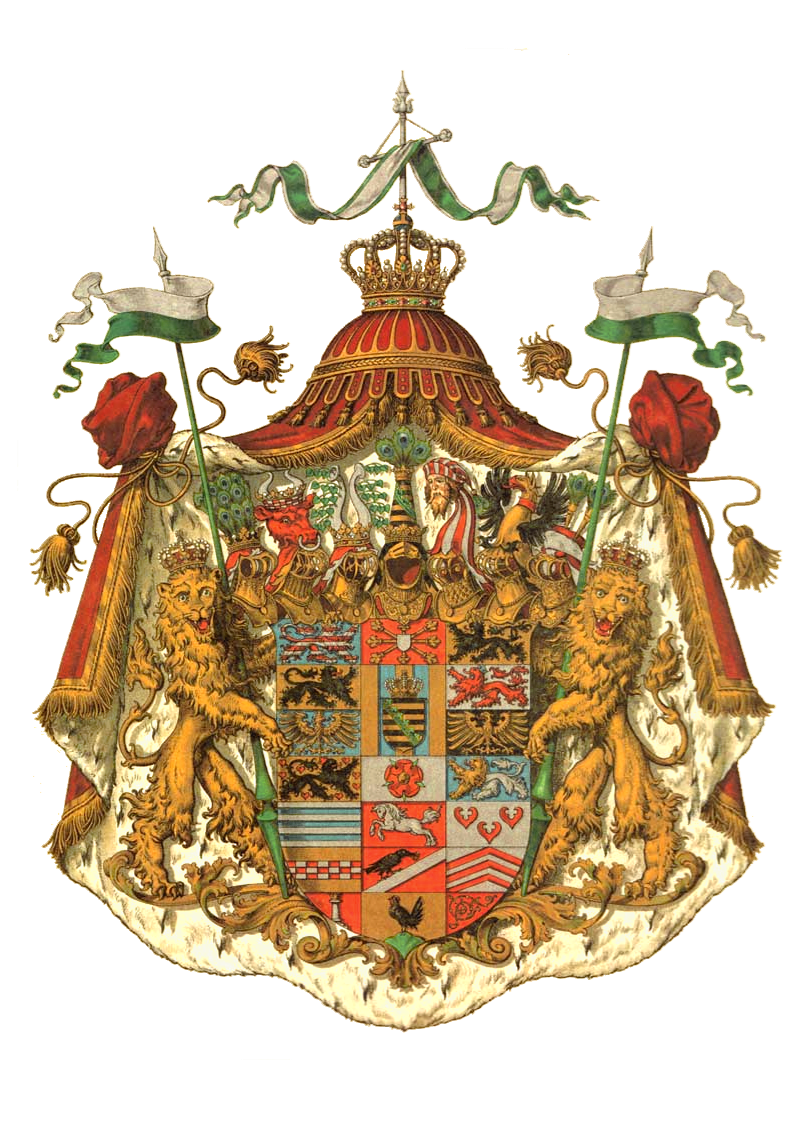
Coat of arms of Saxe-Altenburg

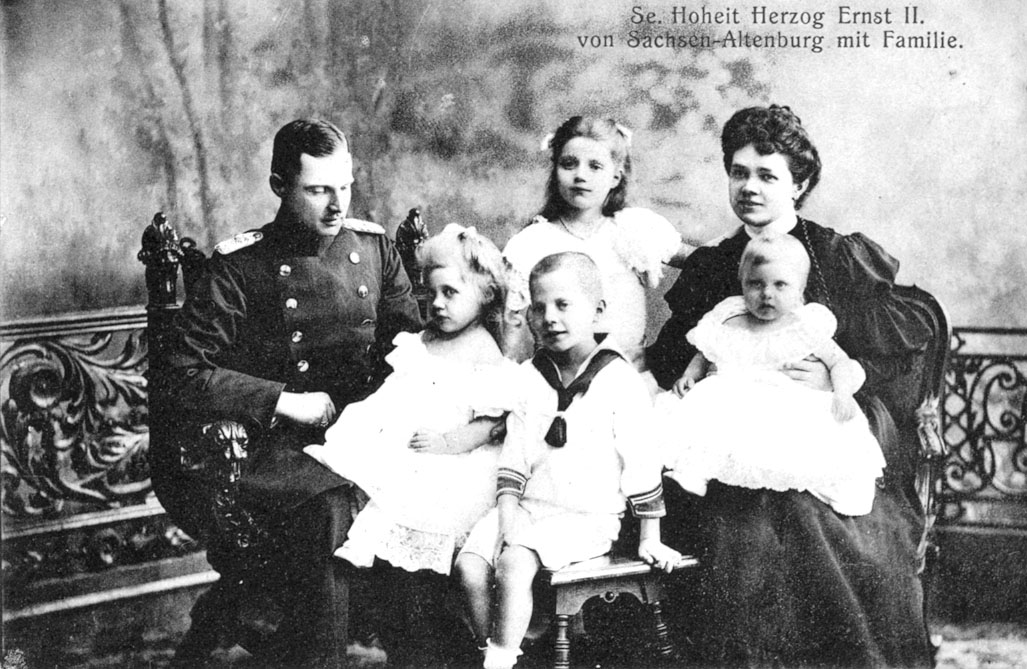
Ernst II and family

When Germany lost the war, all the German princes lost their titles and estates. Ernst II, Duke of Saxe-Altenburg was one of the first princes to realize major changes were coming for Germany, and quickly arrived at an amicable settlement with his subjects. He was forced to abdicate the government of the duchy on 13 November 1918, and spent the rest of his life like a private citizen. On 1 May 1937, Ernst joined the Nazi party. Ernst became the only former reigning German prince who accepted German Democratic Republic citizenship after World War II, refusing an offer to leave his beloved Jagdschloß Fröhliche Wiederkunft and relocate to the British occupation zone. The palace had been confiscated by the Soviet occupiers, but Ernst had been granted free use of it until his death. In March 1954, with the death of Charles Edward, Duke of Saxe-Coburg and Gotha, he became the last survivor of the German princes who had reigned until 1918. One year later, on 22 March 1955, he died at his palace.

NSDAP	Nazi Party	Military rank	Title and name	Royal house	Saxe-Altenburg princes in the Nazi Party
NSDAP – 4868932	Joined: 1 May 1937		Ernst II, Duke of Saxe-Altenburg	Saxe-Coburg Altenburg	Born 31 August 1871. Prince Ernst II, was only son of Prince Moritz, the youngest son of Georg, Duke of Saxe-Altenburg and Princess Augusta. Ernst married Princess Adelaide, a granddaughter of Prince George William. Prince Ernst became the only former reigning prince who accepted GDR citizenship after World War II, refusing to relocate to the British occupation zone. In 1954, on the death of Charles Edward, he became the last of the German princes who had reigned until 1918. (d. 22 November 1955).

== Duchy of Saxe-Coburg and Gotha ==
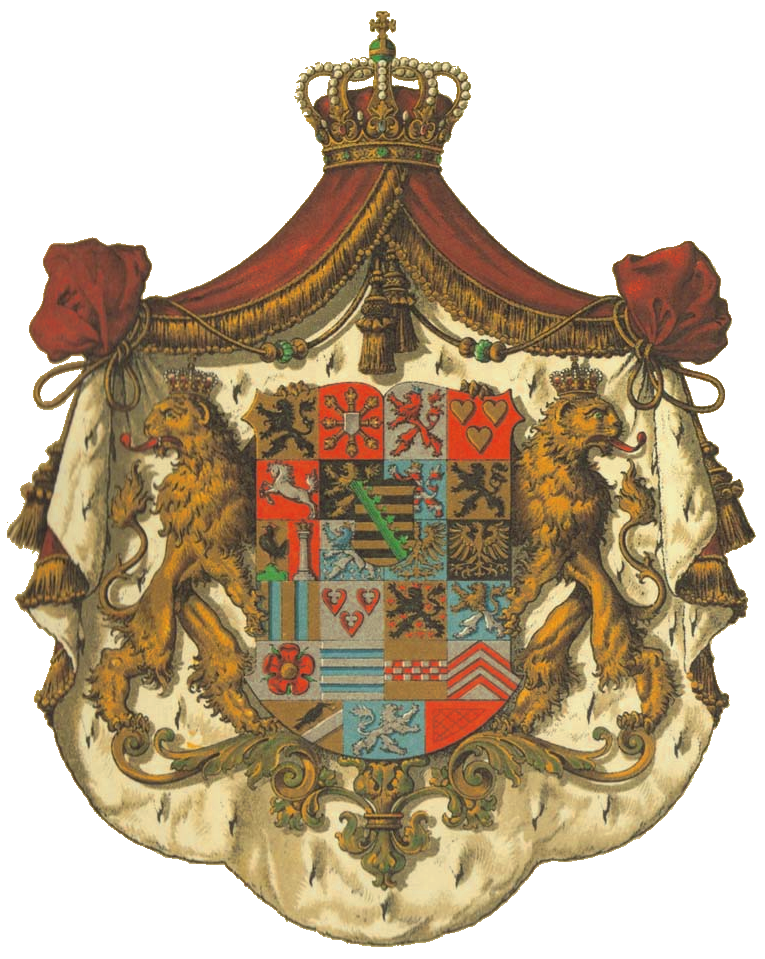
Coat of arms of Saxe-Coburg and Gotha

House of Saxe-Coburg and Gotha
- Parent house: House of Wettin
- Titles: Duke of Saxe-Coburg and Gotha (1826–1918)`; King of the Belgians (1831–present); King of Portugal and the Algarves (1837–1910); Prince of Bulgaria (1887–1908); King of Great Britain and Ireland (1901–1917); Tsar of Bulgaria (1908–1946)

Charles Edward, Duke of Saxe-Coburg and Gotha was the last reigning Duke of Saxe-Coburg and Gotha, and the head of the House of Saxe-Coburg and Gotha until his death in 1954. A male-line grandson of Queen Victoria and Prince Albert, he was also, until 1919, a Prince of the United Kingdom as the Duke of Albany. The Duke was a controversial figure in the UK due to his status as sovereign Duke of Saxe-Coburg and Gotha, part of the German Empire, during World War I, when he held a commission as a general in the German Army. Consequently, George V ordered his name removed from the register of the Knights of the Garter in 1915. In July 1917, Charles Edward and his children had the Royal Arms insignia removed from their Saxe-Coburg and Gotha coats of arms. In 1918, he was forced to abdicate his ducal throne. He retained the style Highness of a sovereign ducal house in Germany, until 18 November 1918 when a Workers' and Soldiers' Council of Gotha deposed him. On 23 November 1918, he signed a declaration relinquishing his rights to the throne. In 1919, Charles Edward and his children also lost their British peerages, the titles of Prince and Princess of the United Kingdom, the styles Royal Highness and Highness, and other British honours.

In 1977, Ottfried Neubecker, Director of the German General Rolls of Arms and of the Board of the International Academy of Heraldry, with the cooperation of J. P. Brooke-Little from the College of Arms, published A Little Brown Book, later reprinted in 1988, 1989 and 1997 as Heraldry. Sources, Symbols and Meaning (ISBN 0-316-64141-3). On page 96, Neubecker states that: "The reigning royal family in Great Britain goes back to Prince Albert of Saxe-Coburg, husband of Queen Victoria. Our summary of the family tree covers all those descended in the male line from Queen Victoria. As the princes of Saxe-Coburg and Gotha were excluded from the British royal family in 1893, the labels chosen independently by them were not recognized in England. ... on 17 July 1917 the name of Saxe-Coburg was changed to Windsor." By warrant of 12 September 1917, and subsequent Order in Council of 1919, George V removed the inescutcheon of Saxony from the arms of all descendants of the Prince Consort. Of George's 29 first-cousins on his father's side, 19 were German, the rest half-German; while on his mother's side, of the 31 first-cousins, six were German and 25 half-German.

In 1919, most, if not all of these Saxe-Coburg Gotha princes lost their German titles and royal status, in accordance with the Weimar Constitution, which abolished their German monarchy. Although according to Neubecker: "the princes of Saxe-Coburg and Gotha were excluded from the British royal family in 1893, the labels chosen independently by them were not recognized in England." Following the successions to the British throne of two such Saxe-Coburg and Gotha princes—as king Edward VII, and king George V—the 1893 Saxe-Coburg and Gotha exclusions of the British branch were finally enacted in 1919, at the end of World War I, shortly prior to the Weimar exclusions.

Saxe Coburg-Gotha exclusions from the British monarchy in 1893, and 1919
Descendants of Prince Consort, Albert of Saxe Coburg-Gotha who were excluded from the British royal family in 1919
Image	Title	Saxe- Coburg and Gotha	LABEL	UK arms	Notes
	Prince Charles Edward of Albany (1884–1954)				Charles used the arms of his father Prince Leopold, Duke of Albany; the son of Prince Albert.
	Prince Arthur of Connaught (1883–1938)				Third son of Prince Albert
	Prince Arthur, Duke of Connaught and Strathearn (1850–1942)				Arms of Prince Edward, Duke of Kent and Strathearn (1767–1820), son of George III, the father of Queen Victoria
	Princess Helena of the United Kingdom (1846–1923) Later: Princess of Schleswig-Holstein.				Arms of Princess Elizabeth (1770–1840), daughter of George III
	Princess Louise, Duchess of Argyll (1848–1939)				Arms of Princess Mary, Duchess of Gloucester and Edinburgh (1776–1857), daughter of George III
	Princess Beatrice of the United Kingdom (1857–1944) Later: Countess of Battenberg				Arms of Princess Sophia (1777–1848), daughter of George III
	Louise, Princess Royal (1867–1931) Later: Duchess of Fife				Daughter of King Edward VII and Alexandra of Denmark, sister of George V
	Princess Victoria of the United Kingdom (1868–1935)				Second daughter of Edward VII; the younger sister of George V.
	Maud of Wales (1869–1938) Later: Queen of Norway				Youngest daughter of Edward VII; younger sister of George V.
	Marie of Romania (of Edinburgh) (1875–1938) Later: Queen of Romania				Daughter of Alfred, Duke of Saxe-Coburg and Gotha
	Princess Victoria Melita of Saxe-Coburg and Gotha (of Edinburgh) (1876–1936); Later: Grand-duchess of Hesse, later Grand-duchess of Russia				Label currently used by Princess Alexandra, The Honourable Lady Ogilvy, daughter of Prince George, Duke of Kent
	Princess Alexandra of Saxe-Coburg and Gotha (of Edinburgh) (1878–1942); Later: Princess of Hohenlohe-Langenburg				Daughter of Alfred, Duke of Saxe-Coburg and Gotha
	Princess Margaret of Connaught (1882–1920) Later: Crown princess of Sweden				Daughter of Prince Arthur, Duke of Connaught and Princess Louise Margaret of Prussia
	Princess Alice, Countess of Athlone (1883–1966)				Daughter of Prince Leopold, Duke of Albany, the youngest son of Prince Albert
	Princess Beatrice of Saxe-Coburg and Gotha (of Edinburgh) (1884–1966) Later: Duchess of Galliera				Daughter of Alfred, Duke of Saxe-Coburg and Gotha
	Princess Patricia of Connaught (1886–1974) Later: Lady Ramsay				Daughter of Prince Arthur, Duke of Connaught and Princess Louise Margaret of Prussia
	Mary, Princess Royal and Countess of Harewood (1897–1965)				Arms of Anne, Princess Royal and Princess of Orange (1709–1759), (daughter of George II), the spouse of William IV, Prince of Orange,

In 1932, Charles Edward took part in the creation of the Harzburg Front, through which the German National People's Party became associated with the Nazi Party. Charles Edward was a member of the (NSDAP), and formally joined the Nazi Party in 1935, becoming a member of the SA (Brownshirts), rising to rank of Obergruppenführer, which at the time was the highest commissioned SS rank, inferior only to that of Reichsführer-SS (Heinrich Himmler). Charles Edward held the same rank as Prince Josias of Waldeck and Pyrmont, Rudolf Hess, von Ribbentrop, Martin Bormann, and Reinhard Heydrich. He was also a member of the Reichstag representing the Nazi Party. In 1936, Adolf Hitler sent Charles Edward to Britain as president of the Anglo-German Friendship Society. His mission was to improve Anglo-German relations and to explore the possibility of a pact between the two countries. He sent Hitler encouraging reports about the strength of pro-German sentiment among the British aristocracy. After the Abdication Crisis, he played host to the Duke and Duchess of Windsor, during their private tour of Germany in 1937.

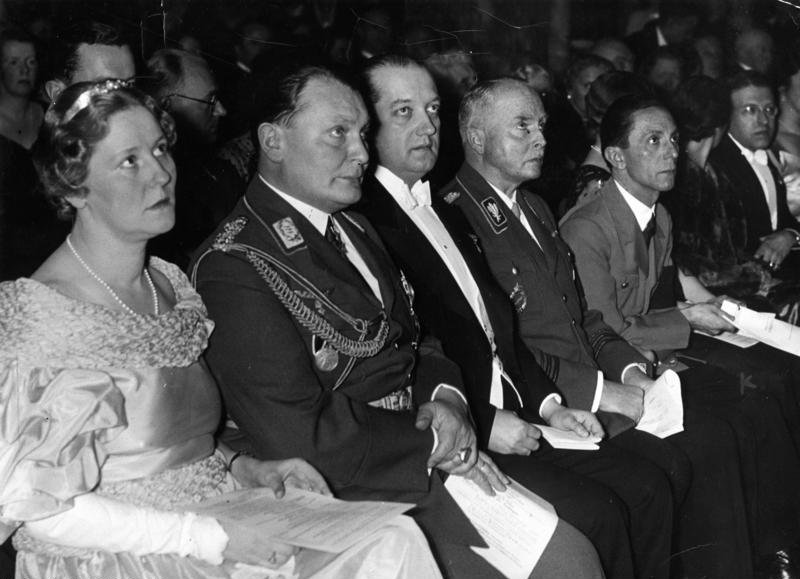
Charles Edward between Hermann Göring and Joseph Goebbels, 26 February 1935

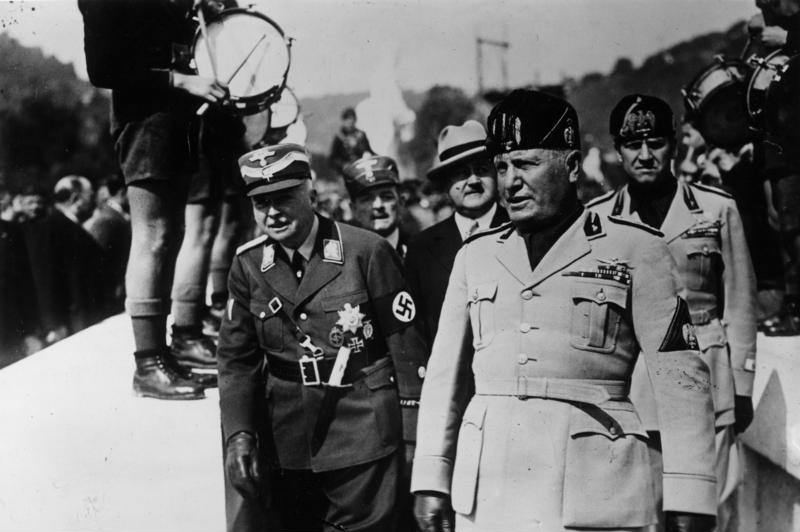
Charles Edward with Mussolini, 19 March 1938

Ernst II, Prince of Hohenlohe-Langenburg, was a German aristocrat, and the Regent of the Duchy of Saxe-Coburg and Gotha during the minority of his wife's cousin, Duke Charles Edward, from 1900 to 1905. Ernst was the oldest of three children, and the only son, of Hermann, Prince of Hohenlohe-Langenburg, and Princess Leopoldine of Baden. He married Queen Victoria's granddaughter Princess Alexandra of Edinburgh, daughter of The Prince Alfred, Duke of Saxe-Coburg and Gotha and Duke of Edinburgh and Grand Duchess Maria Alexandrovna. After Adolf Hitler came to power in 1933, Ernst joined his son Gottfried, Prince of Hohenlohe, who had joined in 1931, in the Nazi Party. Prince Gottfried married Princess Margarita, who was one of the sisters of Prince Philip, Duke of Edinburgh, the consort of Queen Elizabeth II.

Princess Alexandra of Saxe-Coburg and Gotha (Hohenlohe) joined the Nazi Party, in 1937, together with several of her children.

NSDAP	Nazi Party	Military Rank	Title and Name	Royal House	Saxe-Coburg and Gotha Dukes, Princes and Princesses in the Nazi Party
NSDAP – 300354	Joined: 1 September 1930		Prince Rainer of Saxe-Coburg and Gotha	Saxe Coburg. Saxe-Coburg and Gotha	Born 4 May 1900. Prince Rainer was son of Prince August Leopold and his wife Archduchess Karoline Marie of Austria. At the time of his birth the House of Wettin ruled the Kingdom of Saxony and the Ernestine duchies in Germany, as well as the kingdoms of Belgium, Portugal, Bulgaria and the United Kingdom. In line of succession to the Coburg throne, he possessed one of the largest fortunes in Hungary, one of the constituent realms within the Habsburg Empire, whose reigns ended, along with that of the Dukes of Saxe-Coburg and Gotha, in 1918.
NSDAP – 1037966	Joined: 1 April 1932		Johann Leopold, Hereditary Prince of Saxe-Coburg and Gotha	Saxe-Coburg and Gotha	Born 2 August 1906. Prince Johann Leopold was the eldest son of Charles Edward, Duke of Saxe-Coburg and Gotha and Princess Victoria Adelaide of Schleswig-Holstein-Sonderburg-Glücksburg.
NSDAP – 2560843	Joined: 1 May 1933		Charles Edward, Duke of Saxe-Coburg and Gotha	Saxe-Coburg and Gotha	Main article: Charles Edward, Duke of Saxe-Coburg and Gotha Born 19 July 1884. Charles Edward formally joined the Nazi Party in 1933, and SA (Brownshirts), rising to the rank of Obergruppenführer. He also served as a member of the Reichstag representing the Nazi Party from 1937 to 1945. In 1936, Adolf Hitler sent Charles Edward to Britain as president of the Anglo-German Friendship Society. His mission was to improve Anglo-German relations and to explore the possibility of a pact between the two countries. his three sons served in the Wehrmacht.
NSDAP – 7213588	Joined: 1 October 1939		Prince Hubertus of Saxe-Coburg and Gotha	Saxe-Coburg and Gotha	Born 24 August 1909. Prince Hubertus was the son of, Charles Edward, and a great-grandson of Queen Victoria. Hubertus, thus, was also a Prince of the United Kingdom, with the style His Highness. In 1917, George V passed letters patent removing the title of Prince and the style Highness from his relatives, depriving Hubertus of his British titles. Hubertus joined the German Army (Wehrmacht), and saw action in the Eastern Front during World War II. He was killed in action in 1943, in Ukraine.

Unknown ? Saxe-Coburg and Gotha nobility
NSDAP	Nazi Party	Military Rank	Title and Name	Royal House	Unknown ? Saxe-Coburg and Gotha Dukes, Princes and Princesses in the Nazi Party
NSDAP – 196633	Joined: 15 May 1930		Prince Ernst of Saxe-Coburg and Gotha	Saxe-Coburg and Gotha	Born 25 February 1907. Prince Ernst was the son of Prince August Leopold (aka Prince of the Empire of Brazil) and Archduchess Karoline Marie of Austria. Prince Augusts' wife was the daughter of Archduke Karl Salvator of Austria, Prince of Tuscany, and his wife Princess Maria Immaculata of Bourbon-Two Sicilies. Prince Ernst married morganatically to Irmgard Röll. This marriage was childless. (d. 9 June 1978).
NSDAP – 1037967	Joined: 1 April 1932		Hereditary Princess Foedora of Saxe-Coburg and Gotha	Saxe-Coburg and Gotha	Born 7 July 1905. Princess Feodora Freiin von der Horst (1905–1991), was Prince Johann Leopold's first wife.
NSDAP – 1560711	Joined: 1 March 1933		Princess Irmgard of Saxe-Coburg and Gotha	Saxe-Coburg and Gotha	Main article: Krupp Born 27 January 1912. Princess Irmgard was the daughter of Gustav Krupp von Bohlen und Halbach and Bertha Krupp. Gustav Krupp was "a super Nazi". Krupp was an avowed monarchist, and was persuaded the NASDP could end the Republic and restore the Kaiser and the old elites for renewed German expansion. Bertha Krupp never liked Hitler and she pleaded illness when he came on an official tour in 1934. Her daughter Irmgard acted as hostess. Krupp secretly built artillery in Sweden, and built submarine pens in the Netherlands. In the 1930s, it also manufactured tanks and other war materials for Hitler. Krupp was a member of the Prussian State Council from 1921 to 1933. Gustav Krupp was named as a war criminal at the 1945 Nuremberg Trials.
NSDAP – 1453322	Joined: 7 March 1933		Prince Leopoldine of Saxe-Coburg and Gotha	Sax-Coburg and Gotha	Born 13 May 1905. Prince Leopoldine Gonzaga, was son of Prince August Leopold. (d. 24 December 1978).

== Duchy of Saxe-Meiningen ==
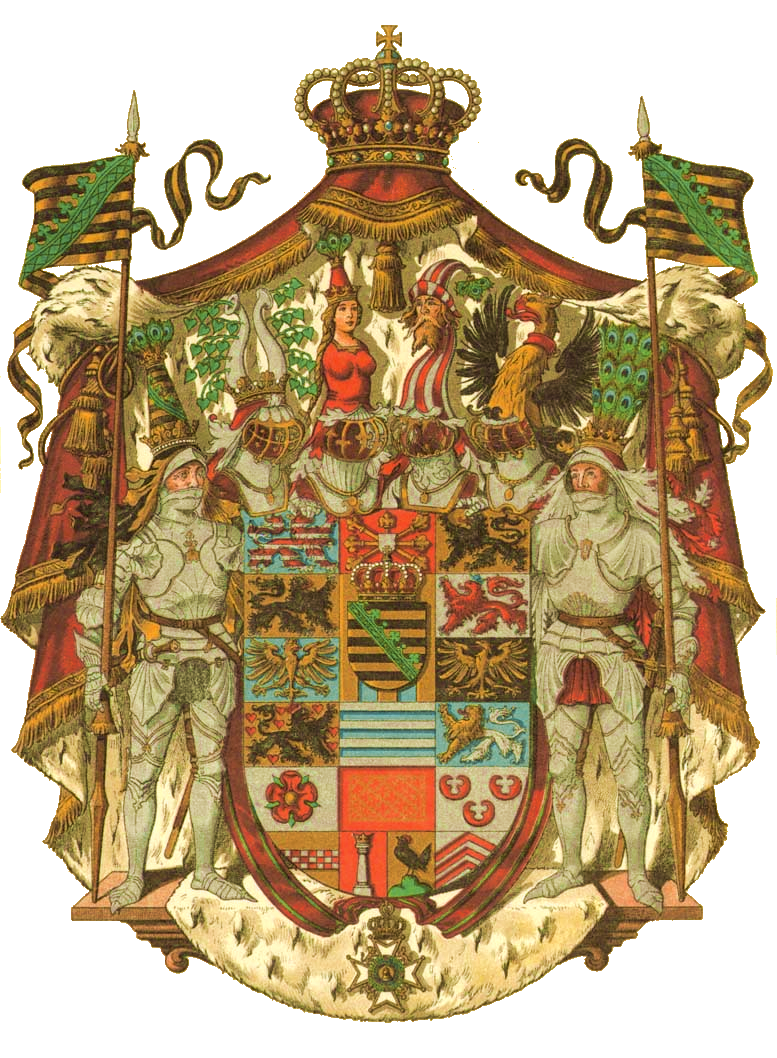
Coat of arms of Saxe-Meiningen

Bernhard III, Duke of Saxe-Meiningen assumed the throne of the Duchy of Saxe-Meiningen after the death of his father in 1914. When Germany lost the war, all the German princes lost their titles and estates. Bernhard was forced to abdicate as duke on 10 November 1918, and spent the rest of his life in his former country as a private citizen. His wife Princess Charlotte of Prussia was the second child of Prince Frederick of Prussia and Princess Victoria. Charlotte was the eldest granddaughter of Queen Victoria and Prince Albert of Saxe-Coburg-Gotha. She was well loved by her paternal grandparents King Wilhelm I and Queen Augusta, and close to her brother Wilhelm II.

Georg, Prince of Saxe-Meiningen, was the head of the house of Saxe-Meiningen from 1941 until his death.He was a nephew of Kaiser Wilhelm II, Georg was the eldest son of Prince Frederick Johann of Saxe-Meiningen (1861–1914) and Countess Adelaide of Lippe-Biesterfeld (1870–1948). His uncle Bernhard III abdicated on 10 November 1918 following the German Revolution. In 1933, Georg joined the Nazi Party. He died in a Russian prisoner of war camp in Northern Russia. His heir was his second and only surviving son Prince Frederick Alfred who renounced the succession, becoming a monk in 1953, allowing it to pass to his uncle Bernhard.

NSDAP	Nazi Party	Military rank	Title and name	Royal house	Saxe-Meiningen princes and princesses in the Nazi Party
NSDAP – 898842	Joined: 1 March 1932		Bernhard, Prince of Saxe-Meiningen	Saxe-Coburg Meiningen	Born 30 June 1901. Prince Bernhard was the third son of Prince Frederick Johann and Countess Adelaide. Bernhard and his first wife were declared guilty of a Nazi conspiracy against Austria in 1933; he was sentenced to six weeks in prison. After intervention of the German envoy, he was released from prison and they escaped to Italy. Three weeks later, he was arrested while trying to return to his castle of Pitzelstaetten. He died in 1984.
NSDAP – 2594794	Joined: 1 May 1933		Georg, Prince of Saxe-Meiningen	Saxe-Coburg Meiningen	Born 11 October 1892. Prince Georg the eldest son of Prince Frederick Johann of Saxe-Meiningen (1861–1914) and Countess Adelaide of Lippe-Biesterfeld (1870–1948). His father was a son of Georg II, Duke of Saxe-Meiningen. After the death of his uncle Ernst in 1941, Georg succeeded to the headship of the House of Saxe-Meiningen and assumed the title of Duke of Saxe-Meiningen and style Georg III. Prince Georg died in the Russian prisoner of war camp near Cherepovets in Northern Russia, in 1946.

Unknown Saxe-Meiningen nobility
NSDAP	Nazi Party	Military rank	Title and name	Royal house	Saxe-Meiningen princesses in the Nazi Party
NSDAP – 525333	Joined: 1 March 1931		Princess Clara of Saxe-Coburg Meiningen	Saxe-Coburg Meiningen	Born 31 May 1895
NSDAP – 898841	Joined: 1 March 1932		Princess B. Margot of Saxe-Coburg Meiningen	Saxe-Coburg Meiningen	Born 22 November 1911

== Principality of Lippe ==
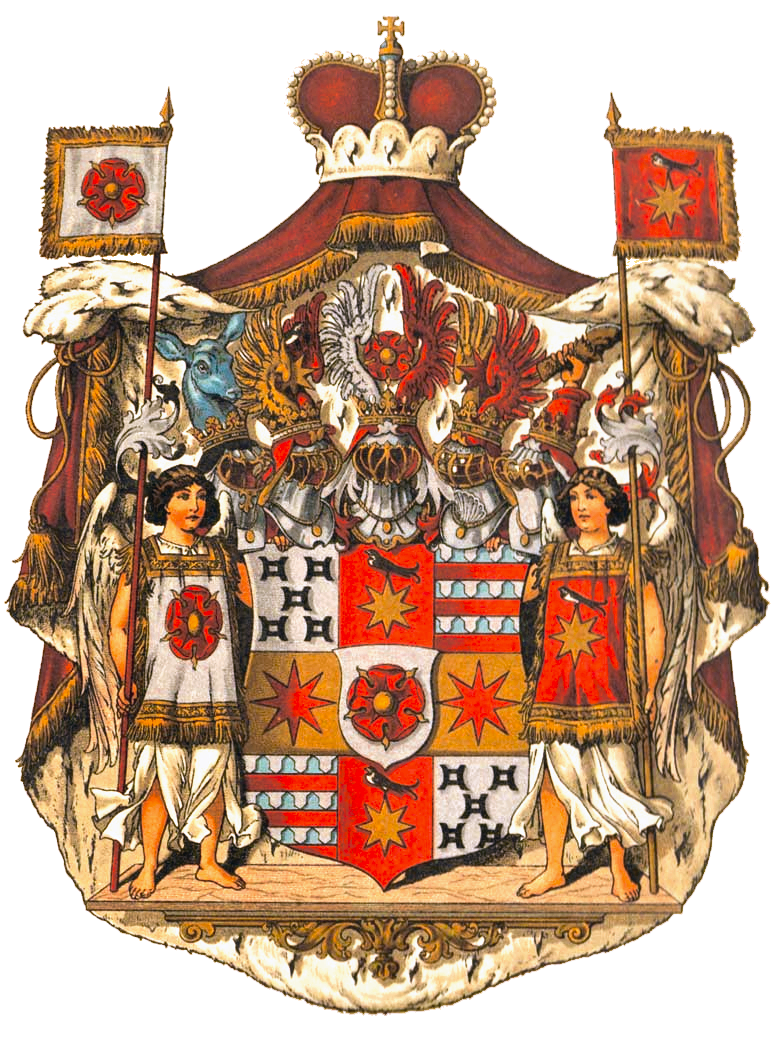
Coat of arms of Lippe

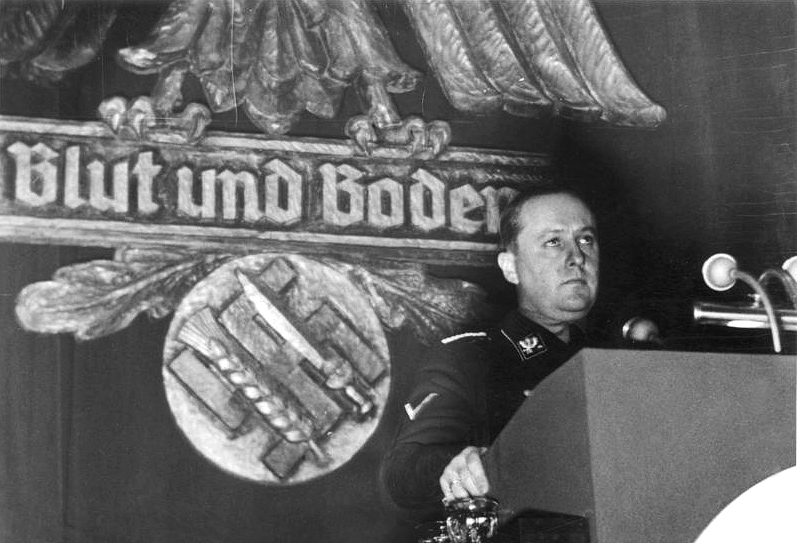
Darré at Reich Food, before 3000 people in Lower Saxony, 13 December 1937

Leopold IV, Prince of Lippe was forced to renounce the throne on 12 November 1918. Following the end of his rule, Lippe became a Free state in the new Weimar Republic. All three of his sons by his first wife became members of the Nazi party. His eldest son Prince Ernst is reported to have been the first German prince to join the party when he joined in May 1928. When Leopold died in Detmold his three eldest sons were all disinherited and his youngest son Armin, Prince of Lippe, became head of the house.

Princess Marie Adelheid of Lippe was the daughter of Count Rudolph and Princess Luise of Ardeck. In 1920, Marie Adelheid married Prince Heinrich XXXII, who had once been close to succeeding Queen Wilhelmina to the Dutch throne. They divorced in 1921. Marie Adelheid's third marriage, in 1927, was to Hanno Konopath, a Nazi government official. This marriage created some important contacts for her in the Nazi regime.

Like the Hesse family, the Lippe dynasty joined the Nazi party in great numbers (eighteen members would eventually join). Some German states, such as Hesse-Nassau and Lippe, provided a proportionally higher number of SS officers. Marie Adelheid developed strong connections with the Nazi regime, and became a leading socialite during that time. In 1921, she was an aide to the Nazi Minister of Food and Agriculture, Richard Walther Darré (a friend of her third husband's). Her cousin Ernst, Prince of Lippe, (son of Leopold IV, Prince of Lippe) was also employed under Darré. Marie Adelheid devoted her writing talent to promoting Nazi ideals, in particular those of Darré, whose views suffered as new plans were produced by Himmler and Göring. As Darré's influence declined, so did that of Marie Adelheid and her cousin.

NSDAP	Nazi Party	Military Rank	Title and Name	Royal House	Lippe Princes and Princesses in the Nazi Party
NSDAP – 88835	Joined: 1 May 1928		Ernst, Hereditary Prince of Lippe	Lippe	Born 12 June 1902. Ernst, Hereditary Prince of Lippe (1902–1987) married first (1924) Charlotte Ricken (1900–1974). He married secondly (1937) Herta-Elise Weiland (1911–1970). Prince Ernst was the first son of Leopold IV, Prince of Lippe; all three of his sons by his first wife became members of the party. His eldest son the Hereditary Prince Ernst is reported to have been the first German prince to join the party when he signed up in May 1928. In 1938 Prince Ernst worked with, and became second Adjutant to Walter Darré, the "Reich Peasant Leader", at the Nazi Ministry of Agriculture. In 1939 he was one of three main aides to the Minister, in his functions as Reich Minister, and Reichsleiter of the Nazi Party. Prince Ernst actively supported Darré's activity as Reichsleiter of the NSDAP, whilst also being Darré's adjutant as Reich Farm Leader, Prince Ernst's official residence was in the Reich Office of Agricultural Policy. Prince Ernst's main task as a party aide, was to act as a liaison between the Reich Office, for country people in Munich and in Berlin. As an adjutant, Prince Ernst was a member of the SS (SS-Nr. 314 184), with the honorary rank of [[SS-Sturmbannführer|Ss-Sturmbannführer]]. He is listed in the Race and Settlement Main Office. Prince Ernst testified at the Nuremberg Trials.
NSDAP – 2583009	Joined: 1 March 1933		Prince Bernhard of Lippe-Biesterfeld	Lippe	Main article: Prince Bernhard of Lippe-Biesterfeld Born 29 June 1911. Prince Bernhard (1911–2004), later Prince Bernhard of the Netherlands, was the husband of Queen Juliana of the Netherlands and father of the Queen of the Netherlands, Princess Beatrix. After WWI, Bernhard's family lost their German Principality. Prince Bernhard joined the Nazi Party, and the Sturmabteilung(SA), which he left in 1934. The Prince later denied that he had belonged to SA, to the Reiter-SS (SS Cavalry Corps), and to the National Socialist Motor Corps. During WWII, Prince Bernhard was part of the London-based Allied war planning councils and saw active service as a Wing Commander (RAF) flying both fighter and bomber planes into combat. He was a Dutch General and Supreme Commander of the Dutch Armed forces, involved in negotiating the terms of surrender of the German Army in the Netherlands. After the War he was made Honorary Air Marshal of the RAF by Queen Elizabeth II. In England, Prince Bernhard asked to work in British Intelligence but the War Admiralty, and later General Eisenhower's Allied Command offices, did not trust him enough to allow him access to intelligence information. On the recommendation of Bernhard's friend King George VI, after being personally screened by intelligence officer Ian Fleming at the behest of Churchill, he was later given work in the Allied War Planning Councils.
NSDAP – 5854038	Joined: 1 May 1937		Prince Ernst-Aschwin of Lippe-Biesterfeld	Lippe-Biesterfeld	Born 13 June 1914. Prince Aschwin of Lippe-Biesterfeld was the younger brother of Prince Bernhard of Lippe-Biesterfeld. When Adolf Hitler came to power, Aschwin openly supported the Nazis and become a Wehrmacht officer. Prince Bernhard is said to have cut off communications with Nazi supporters, including his brother.

Unknown Lippe nobility
NSDAP	Nazi Party	Military rank	Title and name	Royal house	Lippe princes and princesses in the Nazi Party
NSDAP – 292948	Joined: 1 March 1930		Prince Kurt of Lippe	Lippe	Born 5 March 1855. Prince Kurt (1855–1934) married (I) Sophie von Klengel (1857–1945) married (II) Johanna Krischke (1894–1987) 1. Marie Sophie (1886–1946) 2. Karl Christian (1889–1942).
NSDAP – 461527	Joined: 1 February 1931		Prince Karl Christian Joachim of Lippe	Lippe	Born 21 October 1889.
NSDAP – 479952	Joined: 1 March 1931		Prince Ludwig of Lippe	Lippe	Born 27 September 1909.
NSDAP – 565619	Joined: 1 June 1931		Princess Sophie of Lippe	Lippe	Born 9 April 1857.
NSDAP – 621441	Joined: 1 September 1931		Princess Johanna of Lippe	Lippe	Born 15 June 1894.
NSDAP – 674238	Joined: 1 October 1931		Princess Hedwig-Maria of Lippe	Lippe	29 December 1903.
NSDAP – 868756	Joined: 1 January 1932		Count Otto of Lippe	Lippe	Born 4 July 1904.
NSDAP – 891529	Joined: 1 February 1932		Prince Leopold Barnard of Lippe	Lippe	Born 19 May 1904. Prince Leopold Bernhard (1904–1965), was the second son of Leopold IV, Prince of Lippe.
NSDAP – 1334759	Joined: 1 October 1932		Princess Elisabeth of Lippe	Lippe	Born 27 October 1900.
v 5164799	Joined: 1 May 1937		Prince Christian of Lippe-Biesterfeld	Lippe-Biesterfeld	
v 4533031	Joined: 1 May 1937		Prince Ferdinand of Lippe-Weissenfeld	Lippe-Weissenfeld	Born 16 July 1903. Prince Carl Franz Ferdinand of Lippe-Weissenfeld was the son of Clemens Prince of Lippe-Weissenfeld and Friederike Baronin von Carolowitz. He married Dorothea Princess von Schönburg-Waldenburg. He died on 26 September 1939 at age 36 at near Lublin, Poland, killed in action.
NSDAP – 6153171	Joined: 1 May 1938		Princess Franziska of Lippe	Lippe	Born 14 December 1902.
NSDAP – 7218152	Joined: 1 October 1939		Prince Kurt-Bernhard of Lippe	Lippe-Biesterfeld	Born 4 July 1901.
NSDAP – 4320380	Joined: withheld		Count Rolf of Lippe	Lippe	Born 4 January 1912.
NSDAP – 3723952	Joined: withheld		Prince Walther of Lippe	Lippe	Born 7 April 1878.

== Principality of Schaumburg-Lippe ==
Adolf II, Prince of Schaumburg-Lippe succeeded his father Georg as Prince in 1911, and ruled until he was forced to abdicate on 15 November 1918. Following the German revolution: the Principality became the Free State of Schaumburg-Lippe. Adolf married Ellen Bischoff-Korthaus; they were both killed in a plane crash in Mexico in 1936, in a controlled flight into the side of a volcano. He was succeeded as head of the House of Schaumburg-Lippe by his brother Wolrad.

Prince Adolph's brother Prince Friedrich Christian was the third son of Prince Georg. Friedrich's brother Adolf II was the "last German prince forced to abdicate". After World War I, Friedrich Christian was an ardent Nazi Party supporter, worked vigorously to gain noble and royal support for the party, and eventually became an upper privy councillor and adjutant to Propaganda Minister Joseph Goebbels. In 1939, Friedrich was asked to become King of Iceland by Icelanders sympathetic to the Nazi party, but refused due to the opposition of Foreign Minister Joachim von Ribbentrop. Friedrich felt disillusioned by the abdication of Emperor Wilhelm II, and even more unhappy over the "cowardly abdications" of the German princes in 1918. The prince wished for a restoration of the monarchy, he believed that Adolf Hitler was also in accord with these views, writing in his diary, "Hitler was in principle for the monarchy, but not for the continuation of that which, in his opinion, had failed totally." The prince "liked to think the "National Socialists as true heirs of the old nobility."

The House of Schaumburg-Lippe had ten members in the Nazi party. Hitler wanted these high-ranking members of society for propaganda reasons – the more who joined, the more socially acceptable his new regime would be. Like Friedrich, and his brother Prince Wolrad, Hitler appointed many of these new members to the Sturmabteilung as stormtroopers. Hitler made various assurances to the party's noble members, leading them to believe he intended to restore the monarchy. Friedrich Christian was a speaker for the Nazi Party in 1929, and worked vigorously to gain the support of other noble families behind Hitler. He worked closely with Propaganda Minister Joseph Goebbels, who gave him a position in the newly created Ministry of Public Enlightenment and Propaganda.

By April 1933, Friedrich Christian was both an upper privy councillor and Goebbels's adjutant. That year, the prince arranged for the minister's involvement in the Berlin University book burning. As evident from photographs and diaries during that time, Hitler and Goebbels both held Friedrich Christian in high esteem. As World War II led to German military defeats, Hitler became more suspicious of royal and noble families, questioning their loyalties. By 1943, he secretly ordered all Nazi bureaucracies to compile a record of members, and then personally decided if they were to be "retired" or allowed to stay. Most of the princes were unwillingly booted out of the party as a result. Goebbels went to Hitler to protect Friedrich Christian, who obtained a special waiver, for the prince's "future deployment in the Propaganda Ministry".

In 1947, four German princes—Friedrich Christian, Prince August Wilhelm of Prussia, Prince Philipp of Hesse, and Hereditary Prince Ernst of Lippe—were brought under arrest to the war crimes jail at Nuremberg in order to appear as witnesses in a portion of 16 trials of high-ranking Nazi criminals. Viewed as an "old-line party member" who made propaganda excursions to many foreign countries on Goebbels's behalf, Friedrich Christian was the last of the four to testify.

NSDAP	Nazi Party	Military rank	Title and name	Royal house	Schaumburg-Lippe princes and princesses in the Nazi Party
NSDAP – 95146	Joined: 1 August 1928		Prince Friedrich Christian of Schaumburg-Lippe	Schaumburg-Lippe	Friedrich was an ardent Nazi Party supporter, who worked to gain royal support for them, becoming an upper privy councillor and adjutant to Propaganda Minister Joseph Goebbels. In 1939, Friedrich was asked to become King of Iceland by Icelanders sympathetic to the Nazi party, but refused due to the opposition of Joachim von Ribbentrop. SA-Standartenführer (SA-Standard leader (regiment sized unit)).
NSDAP – 3681098	Joined: 1 August 1935		Wolrad, Prince of Schaumburg-Lippe	Schaumburg-Lippe	Wolrad married his second cousin Princess Bathildis of Schaumburg-Lippe (1903–1983). He was the brother of Adolf II, Prince of Schaumburg-Lippe, Princes Friedrich Christian and Stephan, the four sons of Georg, Prince of Schaumburg-Lippe.
NSDAP – 3681097	Joined: 1 October 1935		Princess Bathildis of Schaumburg-Lippe	Schaumburg-Lippe	Princess Bathildis (1903–1983), married Wolrad, Prince of Schaumburg-Lippe. Bathildis was the only daughter of Prince Albert of Schaumburg-Lippe and Duchess Elsa of Württemberg.

Unknown Schaumburg-Lippe nobility
NSDAP	Nazi Party	Military rank	Title and name	Royal house	Unknown Schaumburg-Lippe nobility
NSDAP – 638702	Joined: 1 May 1938		Prince Albrecht of Schaumburg-Lippe	Schaumburg-Lippe	
NSDAP – 3018293	Joined: 1 May 1933		Prince Max of Schaumburg-Lippe	Schaumburg-Lippe	Prince Max of Schaumburg-Lippe (28 March 1898 – 4 February 1974), married in 1933 to Princess Helga-Lee of Schaumburg-Lippe, no issue.
NSDAP – 7965863	Joined: 1 May 1938		Prince Walburgis of Schaumburg-Lippe	Schaumburg-Lippe	Prince Walbergis joined on the same day as Prince Franz Joseph.
NSDAP – 6189085	Joined: 1 May 1938		Franz Joseph Adolph Ernst of Schaumburg-Lippe	Schaumburg-Lippe	Prince Franz Josef of Schaumburg-Lippe (1 September 1899 – 7 July 1963), married in 1959 to Maria Theresia Peschel. His mother Duchess Elsa of Württemberg; (1876–1936) was a daughter of Duke Eugen of Württemberg and Grand Duchess Vera Constantinovna of Russia. She married Prince Albert of Schaumburg-Lippe (1869–1942). Her four children were Prince Franz Josef, Prince Max, Prince Alexander and Princess Bathildis.
NSDAP –144005	Joined: 16 August 1929		Princess Alexandra of Schaumburg-Lippe	Schaumburg-Lippe	d.o.b. withheld
NSDAP – 309345	Joined: 1 October 1930		Princess Ingerborg-Alice of Schaumburg-Lippe	Schaumburg-Lippe	d.o.b. withheld

== Principality of Waldeck-Pyrmont ==
Coat of arms of Waldeck-Pyrmont

Friedrich, Prince of Waldeck and Pyrmont (Friedrich Adolf Hermann Prinz zu Waldeck und Pyrmont; 20 January 1865 – 26 May 1946) was the last reigning Prince of Waldeck and Pyrmont, from 12 May 1893 to 13 November 1918.

Josias, Hereditary Prince of Waldeck and Pyrmont was the heir apparent to Waldeck and Pyrmont. At the end of World War I, his family lost their principality as Waldeck and Pyrmont became a Free State in the new Weimar Republic.

On 1 November 1929, Josias joined the Nazi Party, becoming a member of the SS in 1930. He was immediately appointed adjutant to Sepp Dietrich, a leading member of the SS, before becoming Heinrich Himmler's adjutant and staff chief in September 1930. Waldeck-Pyrmont was elected as the Reichstag member for Düsseldorf-West in 1933 and was promoted to the rank of SS lieutenant general. He was promoted again in 1939, to be the Higher SS and Police Leader for Weimar. In this position he had supervisory authority over Buchenwald concentration camp. After World War II, he was sentenced to life in prison at the Buchenwald Trial (later commuted to 20 years) for his part in the "common plan" to violate the Laws and Usages of War in connection with prisoners of war held at Buchenwald concentration camp, but was released after serving about three years in prison. He was the nephew of William II, King of Württemberg, and Emma of Waldeck and Pyrmont, Queen Regent of the Netherlands. He was also a cousin of Wilhelmina, Queen of the Netherlands, and Charles Edward, Duke of Saxe-Coburg and Gotha.

Prince Josias and his wife, Duchess Altburg of Oldenburg, were the parents of Wittekind, Prince of Waldeck and Pyrmont. Adolf Hitler and Heinrich Himmler were Wittekind's godfathers. Wittekind, who served in the German Armed Forces as a Lieutenant Colonel, succeeded as head of the House of Waldeck and Pyrmont when his father died on 30 November 1967.

NSDAP	Nazi Party	Military rank	Title and name	Royal house	Waldeck-Pyrmont princes and princesses in the Nazi Party
NSDAP – 160025	Joined: 1 November 1929		Josias, Hereditary Prince of Waldeck and Pyrmont	Waldeck and Pyrmont	Born 13 May 1896. Prince Josias was the heir apparent to the Principality of Waldeck and Pyrmont. He joined the SS in 1930, as adjutant to Sepp Dietrich, then became Heinrich Himmler's Adjutant and staff chief. Prince Josias was elected to the Reichstag in 1933, and promoted to SS Lieutenant General. He was promoted again in 1939, to the Higher SS and Police Leader for Weimar, with supervisory authority over Buchenwald concentration camp. Adolf Hitler appointed Josias to the Ordnungspolizei (uniformed police) in 1941. In 1942, he was High Commissioner of Police in German-occupied France. He was then made a General in the Waffen-SS in 1944. Josias was arrested in 1945, and sentenced to life imprisonment at the Buchenwald Trial in 1947. This was commuted to twenty years; after three years he was released in 1950. He was then granted an amnesty by the Minister President of Hesse in 1953.
NSDAP – 161001	Joined: 1 November 1929		Duchess Altburg of Oldenburg	Waldeck and Pyrmont	Born 19 May 1903. Duchess Altburg married Prince Josias, who was the eldest son of Prince Friedrich and Princess Bathildis. Duchess Altburg was a daughter of Grand Duke Frederick Augustus II by his second wife Duchess Elisabeth Alexandrine. Like her own parents, Josias' parents had lost their titles in 1918. Prince Josias and Duchess Altberg joined NSDAP on the same day in 1929. They were amongst the earliest (4th and 5th royals) as Nazi Party members, from the abolished imperial princedoms of 1918.
NSDAP – 8562493	Joined: 1 September 1941		Princess Margarethe of Waldeck and Pyrmont	Waldeck and Pyrmont	Born 22 May 1923. Princess Margarethe was the eldest daughter of Prince Josias and Princess Altberg. Princess Margarethe of Waldeck and Pyrmont married Count Franz August zu Erbach-Erbach (b. 1925).

== Principality of Reuss-Gera (younger line) ==
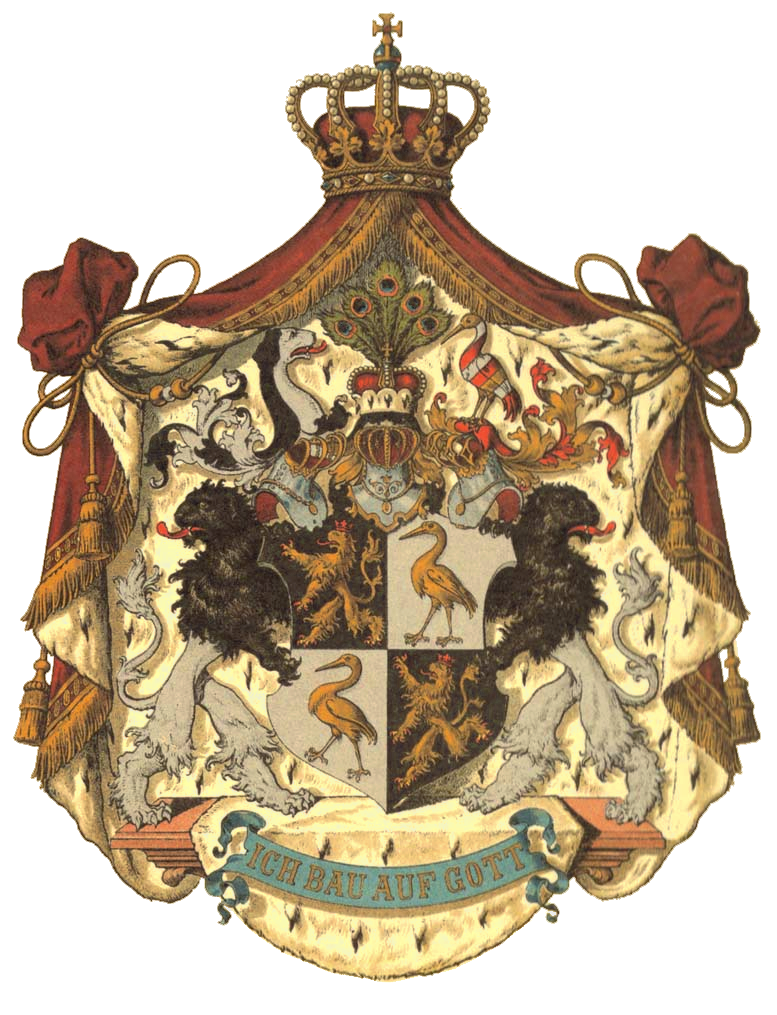
Coat of arms of Reuss-Gera (younger line)

At the death of his father on 29 March 1913, Heinrich XXVII, Prince Reuss Younger Line inherited the throne of the principality; also, he continued the regency of the Reuss Elder Line, because of a physical and mental disability of Prince Heinrich XXIV due to an accident in the latter's childhood. Prince Heinrich XXVII abdicated in 1918 after the German Revolution of 1918–19, when all German monarchies were abolished. After the death of Heinrich XXIV, Prince Reuss Elder Line in 1927, the titles passed to Heinrich XXVII.

Heinrich XLV, Hereditary Prince Reuss Younger Line was the head of the House of Reuss, and last male member of the Reuss-Schleiz branch of the Younger Line. Heinrich XLV was the only surviving son of Heinrich XXVII. During the 1930s Heinrich XLV became a Nazi sympathizer and member of the Nazi Party. In 1945, he was arrested by the Soviet military and disappeared. In 1962, he was declared dead by a court in Büdingen.

NSDAP	Nazi Party	Military rank	Title and name	Royal house	Reuss princes and princesses in the Nazi Party
NSDAP – 237533	1 May 1930		Princess Marie Adelheid of Lippe-Biesterfeld	Reuss	Main article: Princess Marie Adelheid of Lippe-Biesterfeld Born 30 August 1895. Like the Hesse family, the Lippe dynasty joined the Nazi party in great numbers (ultimately eighteen members would eventually join). Some German states provided a proportionally higher number of SS officers, including Hesse-Nassau and Lippe, Marie Adelheid's birthplace. As an ardent believer of the party's views, Marie Adelheid developed strong connections to the emerging Nazi regime, and became a leading socialite during that time.
NSDAP – 2199219	Joined: 1 May 1933		Heinrich XLV, Hereditary Prince Reuss Younger Line	Reuss	Born 13 May 1895. Heinrich XLV became head of the House of Reuss after the Younger and Elder Lines merged in 1927. In 1935 he adopted Prince Heinrich I Reuss of Köstritz (1910–1982), who married his niece Duchess Woizlawa Feodora of Mecklenburg. In August 1945, he was arrested by the Soviet military and disappeared. In 1962, he was declared dead by a court in Büdingen. His entire fortune was confiscated in 1948 by the Soviet Military Administration, including three Castles in Gera. Heinrich XLV remained unmarried and childless.
NSDAP – 3603963	Joined: 1 May 1935		Prince Heinrich XXXIII Reuss of Köstritz	Reuss-Köstritz	Born 1 August 1887. Prince Heinrich XXXIII Reuss was the son of the Prince Heinrich VII Reuss of Köstritz and Princess Marie Alexandrine of Saxe-Weimar-Eisenach. Through his mother, Prince Heinrich XXXIII was heir to the throne of the Kingdom of the Netherlands until the birth of Crown Princess Juliana, daughter of Queen Wilhelmina.

Unknown Reuss nobility
NSDAP	Nazi Party	Military rank	Title and name	Royal house	Unknown Reuss princes and princesses in the Nazi Party
NSDAP – 912977	Joined: 1 February 1932		Prince Heinrich of Reuss	Reuss	Born 28 March 1890. Heinrich Harry, Prince of Reuss, Graf von Plauen, was the son of Heinrich XXVI, Prince of Reuss (b. 15 December 1857) and Victoria, Countess of Fürstenstein (b. 11 September 1863). He was the husband of Huberta Valeska Sascha Eva Anna Dorothea, Freiin von Tiele-Winckler. Prince Heinrich joined the Nazi Party at the same time as Princess Huberta.
NSDAP – 912978	Joined: 1 February 1932		Princess Huberta of Reuss	Reuss	Born 14 April 1889. Princess Edina-Huberta of Reuss, was the daughter of Heinrich Harry, Prince Reuss, Count of Plauen (b. 28 March 1890) and Huberta Valeska Sascha Eva Anna Dorothea, Baroness of Tiele-Winckler (b. 14 April 1889).
NSDAP – 1190474	Joined: 1 May 1932		Prince Heinrich XXXVI	Reuss (Köstritz)	Born 10 August 1888. Heinrich XXXVI Prince Reuß zu Köstritz, was born in Stonsdorf, and died in Oberstdorf 10 May 1956.
NSDAP – 3018157	Joined: 1 May 1933		Prince Heinrich XXXV	Reuss	Born 10 August 1888. Brother of Heinrich XXXIII, and XXXII. Heinrich XXXV (1887–1936) married firstly in 1911 (divorced 1921) Princess Marie of Saxe-Altenburg (1888–1947), married secondly in 1921 (divorced 1923) Princess Marie Adelaide of Lippe (1895–1993).
NSDAP – 4418345	Joined: 1 May 1937		Prince Heinrich XXVII	Reuss	Born 13 December 1897.
NSDAP – 7089148	Joined: 1 September 1939		Prince Heinrich of Reuss	Reuss	Born 26 May 1921. Prince Heinrich V Reuss of Köstritz (d. 28 October 1980) was the son of Marie Adelheid and Heinrich XXXV Prinz Reuss zu Köstritz, her first husband's younger brother.

== See also ==
- List of German monarchs in 1918
- Abdication of Wilhelm II
- List of Nazi Party leaders and officials
- Glossary of Nazi Germany

== Sources ==
- Evans, Richard J. (2003). The Coming of the Third Reich. Penguin Group. ISBN 978-0-14-303469-8.
- Evans, Richard J. (2005). The Third Reich in Power. New York: Penguin Group. ISBN 978-0-14-303790-3.
- Manvell, Roger (2011) [1962]. Goering. Skyhorse. ISBN 978-1-61608-109-6.
- McNab, Chris (2009). The Third Reich. Amber Books. ISBN 978-1-906626-51-8.
- Nesbit, Roy Conyers; van Acker, Georges (2011) [1999]. The Flight of Rudolf Hess: Myths and Reality. Stroud: History Press. ISBN 978-0-7509-4757-2.
- Petropoulos, Jonathan (2006). Royals and the Reich: The Princes von Hessen in Nazi Germany. New York: Oxford University Press. ISBN 978-0-19-979607-6.
- Stein, Harry (2004). Buchenwald concentration camp 1937–1945. Wallstein Verlag. ISBN 3-89244-695-4.
