= Ezechiel Saad =

Argentine-French Zen Buddhist writer and artist (born 1943)

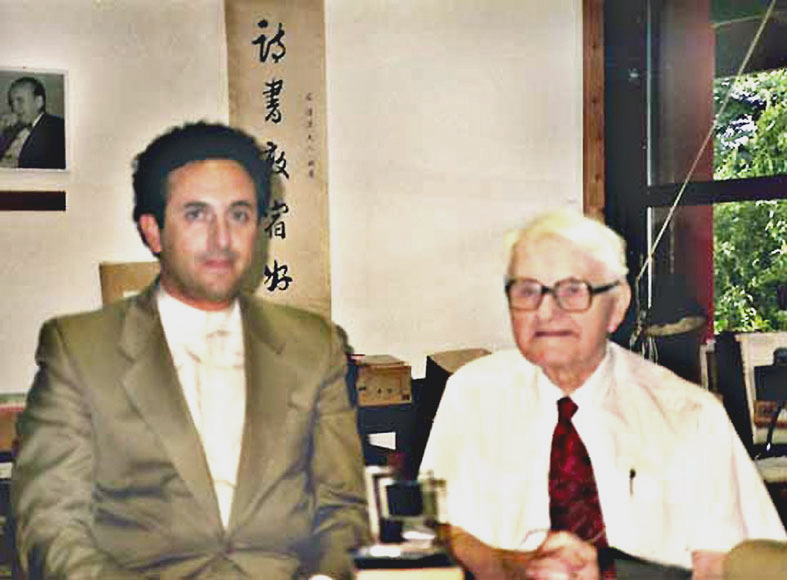
- Saad with sinologist Joseph Needham in Cambridge, 1988.
- Born: Ezechiel Saad; 29 August 1943; Buenos Aires, Argentina
- Occupations: Writer, coach, I Ching expert
- Writing career
- Language: Spanish; French

Ezechiel Saad (born August 29, 1943, Argentina) is an Argentine-French Zen Buddhist writer, painter and graphic designer, lecturer, and cultural entertainer. He specialized in the interpretation of the I Ching or "Book of Changes" and has published four books since 1989.

== Biography ==
Saad was born in Buenos Aires to an immigrant family with a Syrian father and a Ukrainian mother. He travelled from his youth, touring America, Europe and the Far East. During his tour of Latin America met some of the intellectuals who encouraged the cultural life of the time. Soon he was drawn by the humanism and altruism that inspired his compatriots, painter Pérez Celis and poet Alejandra Pizarnik; in Quito, Ulises Estrella and the tzánzicos; and Sergio Mondragón in Mexico. He was part of the Venezuelan literary and artistic group "The roof of the whale" and joined the countercultural movements of the 60s.

Is part of the artistic movement Nueva Presencia that runs Arnold Belkin, and encourages the university cultural life with a radio program at the University of Mexico, assisted by writer Max Aub. In the United States met with poets Allen Ginsberg and Lawrence Ferlinghetti, increasing his spiritual concern.

After his forced return to Argentina to perform military service, sailed to Europe where he discovered the I Ching in 1964, and began experimenting and studying it in the monotheistic religions context. In 1969 he began to practice zazen, sitting as a disciple of Japanese Master Taisen Deshimaru, who brought Zen to Europe.

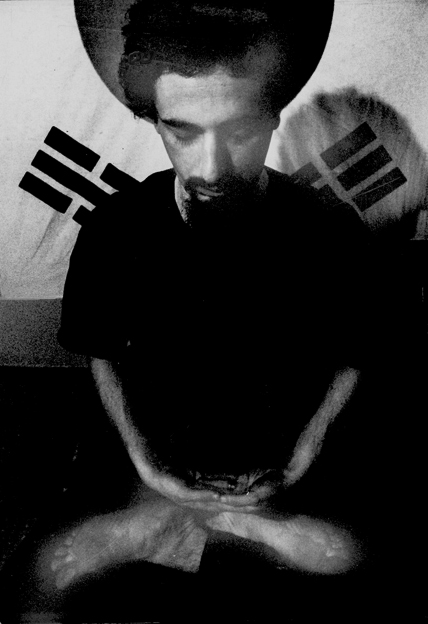
Ezechiel Saad practicing Zazen in Tokyo,1970.

In 1979, after his ordination as Zen monk in Paris he alternated spiritual life, artistic development and trips to Japan and China, where he met and practiced zazen with other masters as Philip Kapleau and Taizan Maezumi. As a result, he was invited to the Eranos Foundation in 1991 by the translator of the I Ching, Rudolf Ritsema.

From 1978 he started as a lecturer at the Sorbonne and Centre Pompidou in Paris, at the Institut belge des hautes études chinoises, Brussels, centres of gestalt psychology with Norberto Levi, and eastern philosophy centres in Europe and South America. In 1996 he created the International School of I Ching in Paris. whose vice-chairman is Peter Adam Coppens.

Between 1967 and 1974 he held an atelier at La Ruche, the artists' residence designed by Gustave Eiffel, participating in the artistic bohemia of Paris, and meanwhile dedicated to the creation and study of Zen as a member of the International Zen Association. As a digital artist he has been a forerunner of symbiotic art, which fuses painting and photography and whose main representative is Carlos Fernández Chicote.
Meanwhile, he is still carrying out his research on philosophy, spirituality and art. Since 1984 he practices and investigates with the I Ching (Yi Jing) and publish several editions in French, Spanish and Portuguese. He deals with the myths and history of the Far East, the notions of chance and determinism, health and wellness, awareness raising and the pursuit of happiness. He introduces in his research the contemplative experience of Zen and Tibetan Buddhism along with Western science and philosophy, following the approach of Dr. Joseph Needham, who will meet twice in Cambridge, 1986–87. He became a naturalised French citizen in 1990.

Since 2003, he has been settled in Barcelona, Spain, where he continues his work as a consultant, writer and artist. He lectures and teaches at Casa Asia, and the Writers' Association of Catalonia. He applies his knowledge of the I Ching and Zen to the study of specific problems with the support of new technologies and social networks.

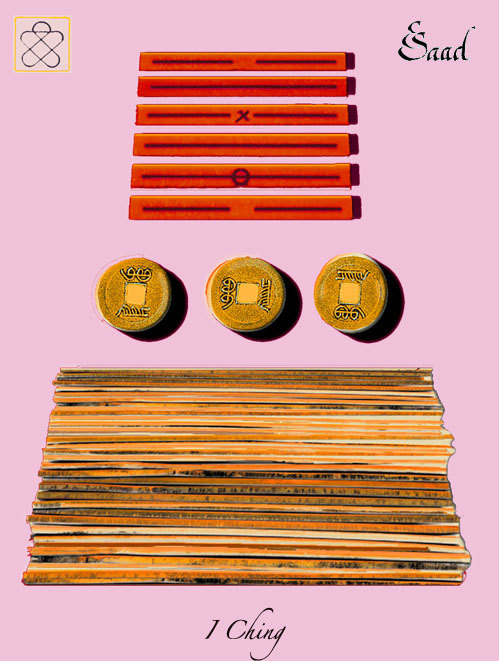
Technics to read into I Ching

== Work Published ==
- Yi King, mythe et histoire, preface by Vincent Bardet, cover design by Zao wou-ki, French, Sophora, Paris 1989. ISBN 2-907927-00-0
- I Ching, Mito e Historia, Spanish, Heptada, Madrid, 1992.ISBN 9788478920310
- I Ching, mito e historia, Portuguese, Pensamiento, Brasil, 1989.ISBN 85-3150-316-7
- Hasard et Intuition, French, preface by zen master Jacques Brosse. Ed. Dervy, París, 1991. ISBN 2-85076-438-8
- Adivinar el Inconsciente / Deviner l’Inconscient, bilingual Spanish~French, Editorial Punto, Barcelona, 2010.
- La escritura china, y la epopeya de lo pragmático, Escuela de I Ching Internacional, Barcelona 2011.
- Nirvāna, suma de arte y meditación, with 58 drawings and "kakemonos". AYN Publishers, Barcelona 2018. ISBN 9788409035267.
