= The Chosen Ones (2014 film) =

2014 German film directed by Christoph Röhl

- Die Auserwählten
- Directed by: Christoph Röhl
- Starring: Ulrich Tukur; Julia Jentsch; Leon Seidel
- Country of origin: Germany
- Original language: German

Production
- Producer: Hans-Hinrich Koch
- Cinematography: Peter Steuger
- Running time: 90 minutes
- Production company: ndF Neue Deutsche Filmgesellschaft mbH

Original release
- Release: 1 October 2014

The Chosen Ones (German: Die Auserwählten) is a 2014 drama television film directed by Christoph Röhl. It was premiered at the Munich Film Festival in 2014 and was first broadcast on 1 October 2014. The film tells the story of a well-publicized child sexual abuse scandal at the Odenwaldschule, a German private boarding school known for its progressive education.

== Production ==
The Chosen Ones is a fictionalized account of a sexual abuse scandal that took place at the Odenwaldschule. The abuse first came to light in 1998 when two former pupils reported their abuse. Their story appeared in the Frankfurter Rundschau but was not reported on by other media outlets. The story resurfaced in 2010 when it was revealed that more than 130 pupils had been sexually abused by and at least 8 teachers in the 1970s and 1980s. Recent studies have subsequently established that between 500 and 900 children were abused at the school.

Director Christoph Röhl was an English tutor at the school from 1989 to 1991. In 2011 he dealt with the same subject matter in the documentary film We're Not The Only Ones (German: Und wir sind nicht die Einzigen). After lengthy negotiations, the board of directors at the Odenwaldschule granted the filmmakers permission for their film to be shot on their premises. In 2015, two years after the film was completed, the Odenwaldschule was forced to close.

== Awards ==
- Nomination Prix Europa 2014
- Winner New York Festival 2014 – Gold World Medal
- Winner ZOOM Igualada Festival 2014 – Best Fiction Film
- Nomination Deutscher Hörfilmpreis 2015 – Best TV Movie
