= Princess Feodora of Saxe-Meiningen =

Feodora of Saxe-Meiningen
- Princess Heinrich XXX Reuss of Köstritz
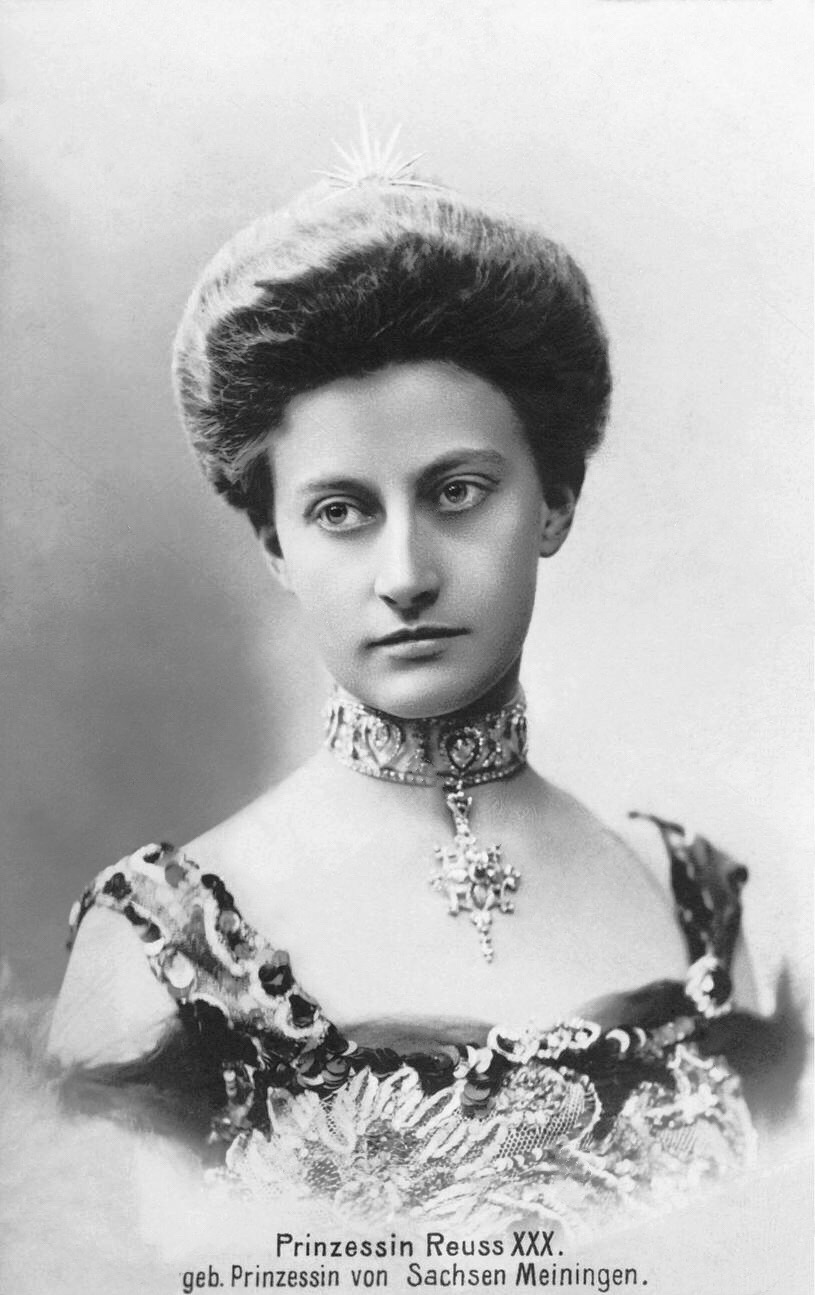
- Photograph of Feodora, Princess of Reuss-Köstritz c. 1900
- Born: 12 May 1879; Potsdam, German Empire
- Died: 26 August 1945 (aged 66); Jelenia Góra, Silesia, Poland
- Burial: 1 September 1945; Kowary, Poland
- Spouse: Prince Heinrich XXX Reuss of Köstritz (m. 1898; died 1939)
Names
- German: Feodora Viktoria Auguste Marie Marianne
- House: Saxe-Meiningen
- Father: Bernhard III, Duke of Saxe-Meiningen
- Mother: Princess Charlotte of Prussia

Princess Feodora of Saxe-Meiningen (Feodora Viktoria Auguste Marie Marianne; 12 May 1879 – 26 August 1945) was born at Potsdam, the only child of Bernhard III, Duke of Saxe-Meiningen and Duchess Charlotte (the eldest daughter of Emperor Friedrich III of Germany and Empress Victoria). Feodora was the first great-grandchild of both William I, German Emperor and Queen Victoria of the United Kingdom.

== Early life ==
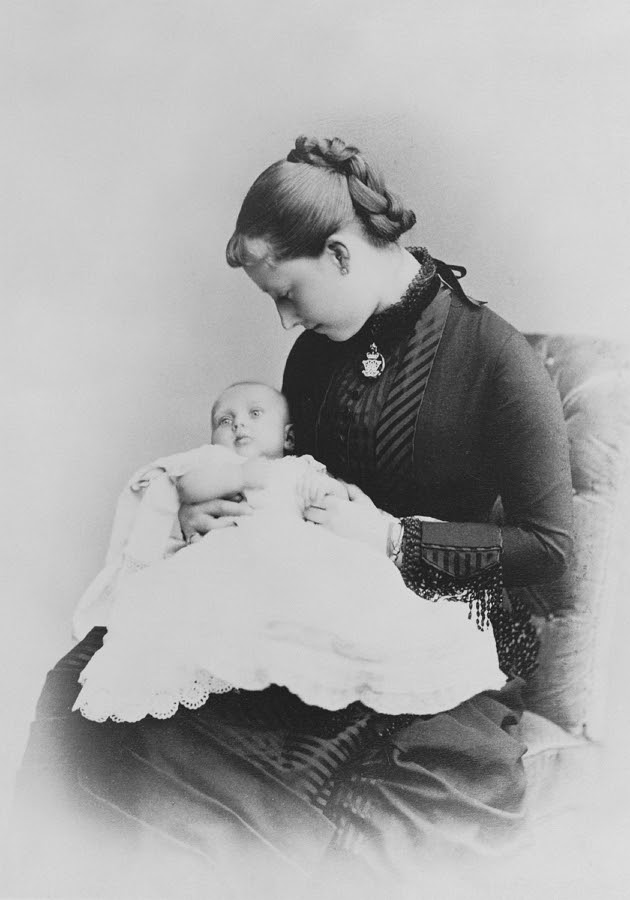
Feodora as a baby, with her mother

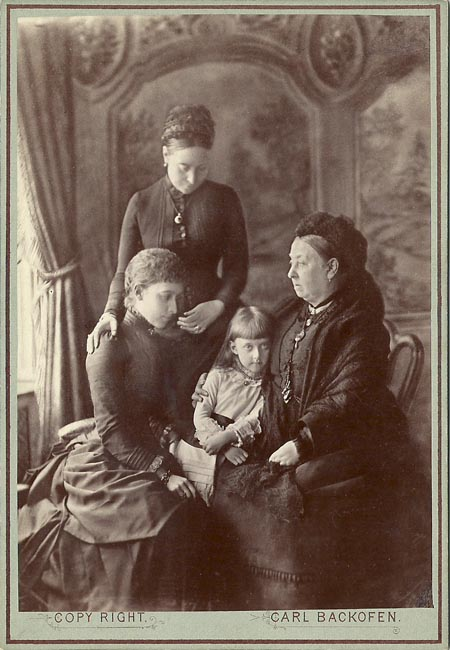
Four generations of royal women: Princess Feodora with her mother, Princess Charlotte; her grandmother, Crown Princess Victoria; and her great-grandmother, Queen Victoria, photo taken by Carl Backofen from Hesse, c. 1885

Princess Feodora was born on 12 May 1879 as the only child of Bernhard, Hereditary Prince of Saxe-Meiningen, and his wife Princess Charlotte of Prussia, herself the eldest daughter of German Crown Prince Frederick William and Crown Princess Victoria. The new baby was the first grandchild of the Crown Prince and Princess, and through her mother was also the first great-grandchild of the British Queen Victoria.

Charlotte, who loved to socialize, had hated being pregnant, believing that it limited her activities. Preferring to return to enjoying social life in Berlin, she declared after Feodora's birth that she would have no further children, dismaying her mother, Crown Princess Victoria. It was unusual to be an only child in European royal families, and Feodora likely endured a lonely childhood. Charlotte loved to travel, and often left her daughter with Vicky at Friedrichshof, whom she viewed as the source of a convenient nursery. The Crown Princess, for her part, loved having the chance to spend time with her eldest granddaughter. Describing Feodora on one visit, she wrote that "she is really a good little child, & far easier to manage than her Mama".

Victoria, who became German empress in 1888, perceived a deficit in Feodora's upbringing and gradually became concerned about the girl's physical appearance and mental development, describing the thirteen-year-old as possessing "sharp pinched features" and an unusually short stature. Feodora also cared little for her studies, preferring instead to discuss fashion. Her grandmother, who placed a high value on education, blamed insufficient parental guidance for the girl's lack of studiousness, commenting that the "atmosphere of her home is not the best for a child of her age... With Charlotte for an example, what else can one expect... Her parents are rarely ever at home or together... She hardly knows what home life is!"

Queen Victoria was fond of her eldest great-grandchild. In June 1887, the young Feodora and her parents attended the queen's Golden Jubilee in London. While her parents stayed at Buckingham Palace, Feodora stayed with her young cousin Princess Alice of Battenberg at the home of the Dowager Duchess of Buccleuch at Whitehall, allowing the girls to watch the royal procession as it made its way to Westminster Abbey. Queen Victoria described her as "sweet little Feo, who is so good and I think grown quite pretty. We were delighted to have her and I think the dear child has enjoyed herself."

== Marriage ==
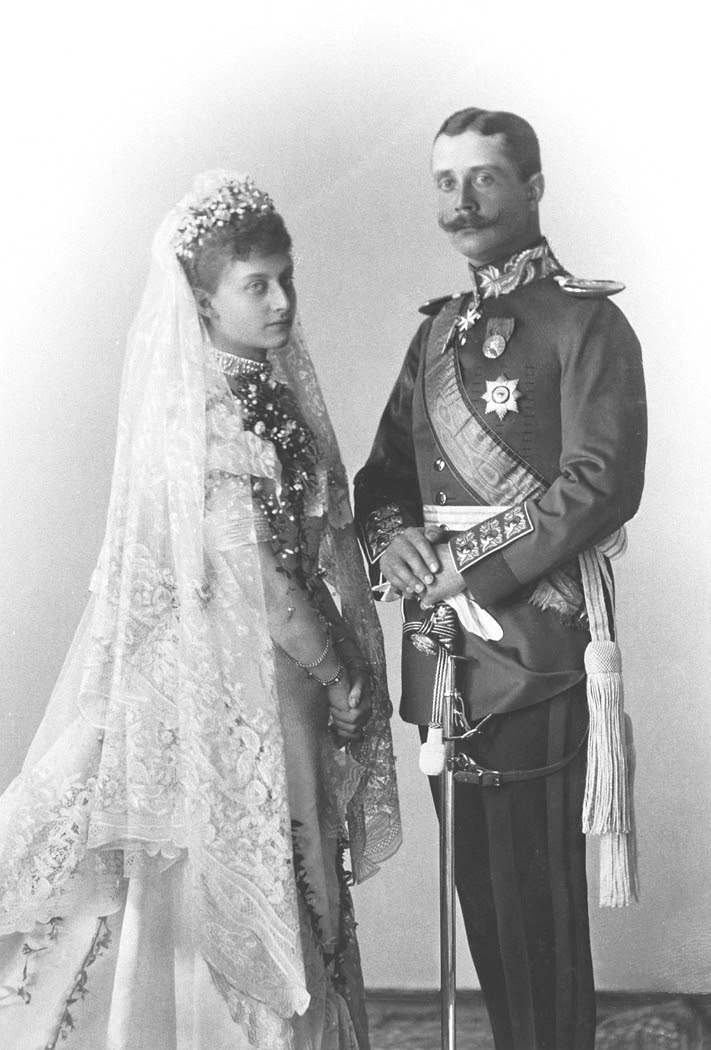
Feodora and Heinrich XXX Reuss, 1898

As Feodora grew older, her marriage began to be a consideration. The widowed, exiled Prince Peter Karađorđević, thirty-six years older than Feodora, proposed himself as a suitor, though this was likely a bid to gain support for succeeding to the Serbian throne. Charlotte declared that "for such a throne Feodora is far too good".

In the mid-1890s, Princess Feodora was considered as a potential bride for King Alexander I of Serbia. As a niece of German Emperor Wilhelm II, she was regarded as a suitable match, and in early 1896 the emperor gave his preliminary approval, advising the Serbian court to initiate formal negotiations with Feodora’s parents. Despite this opportunity, by the end of 1897 the Serbian court had explored other prospective brides from Greece, Montenegro, and Russia without success, leaving the marriage negotiations with Feodora unresolved.

Her mother's maternal first cousin Alfred, Hereditary Prince of Saxe-Coburg and Gotha, the only son of Charlotte's friend (and Feodora's maternal grandaunt) the Duchess of Saxe-Coburg and Gotha, was also considered.

Several months after returning from Queen Victoria's Diamond Jubilee celebrations in June 1897, Feodora became engaged to Prince Heinrich XXX Reuss of Köstritz (1864-1939), with the betrothal announced in early October. Born in Castle Neuhoff, he was the youngest son of Prince Heinrich IX Reuss of Köstritz (1827-1898) and Baroness Anne Marie Wilhelmine Helene of Zedlitz und Leipe (1829-1907). Henry's father died in early 1898, forcing a temporary postponement of the marriage. Rumours that the marriage had been cancelled proved to be untrue, and they married at Breslau on 24 September 1898 in a Lutheran ceremony. Princess Feodora was the only great-grandchild of Queen Victoria and only grandchild of German Empress Victoria to be married in their lifetimes; she married in 1898 and both the Queen and the German Empress died in 1901.

Prince Henry was a captain in the Brunswick Infantry Regiment No. 92, though not particularly wealthy or high-ranked. Feodora's grandmother Empress Victoria was surprised at the choice of groom, particularly his lack of position, but observed that the bride at least seemed happy.

Of the fifteen-year age gap, Victoria commented, "I am very glad he is older than she is, and if he is wise and steady and firm, he may do her a vast deal of good, and it may turn out very well, but she has had a strange example in her mother, and is a strange little creature." The historian John Van der Kiste writes that Feodora was "evidently besotted" with her new husband, and she likely also sought marriage as an escape from her "irksome home life".

Once returned from their honeymoon, Henry spent much of his time on duty with his regiment, while Feodora joined a reading group and attended the opera and theatre in Berlin. Feodora also often accompanied her husband during his military assignments, travelling throughout Germany.

== Last years ==
Feodora suffered most of her adult life from ill health, describing it as "the old story" of her life. Like her mother and maternal grandmother, and maternal great grandmother Feodora's illnesses included dizziness, insomnia, nausea, various pains, paralysis, constipation, and diarrhoea. She underwent several operations to treat her illnesses and alleviate her infertility, each without success.

Feodora visited Windsor Castle in 1900, which would be the last time she saw her great-grandmother before Queen Victoria's death the following year. Henry attended her funeral, but ill health kept Feodora from attending. Feodora blamed malaria for her condition, though Charlotte told family members that Henry had given his wife a venereal disease, an allegation Feodora furiously denied. Charlotte asked her daughter to get tested by Charlotte's personal physician; when Feodora refused, it confirmed to Charlotte that her beliefs were correct. In reaction, Feodora refused to enter her mother's house and complained to family members of Charlotte's "incredible" actions.

In 1903, the couple moved to Flensburg upon Henry being transferred, where they lived in a small house. Feodora found that the region's mild climate had a positive impact on her health. To further improve it and increase the probability of becoming pregnant, she took pills of arsenic and thorium. Her poor health recurred, however, and she again began suffering from toothache and migraines. In October 1904, a serious illness was blamed on influenza. Her further efforts to conceive included numerous visits to private clinics through the years, which often led to painful surgeries and procedures.

=== Two World Wars ===
With the outbreak of World War I, Henry was dispatched to the Western Front, while his wife opened a small hospital to treat wounded soldiers. By this stage, relations between him and his wife had deteriorated; Henry believed Feodora enjoyed complaining about being sick and seeing doctors. He wrote that her illness "consists mainly in complete lack of energy and mental apathy", and complained that "she grossly exaggerates her illnesses and causes me and others quite unnecessary anxiety". Henry died in 1939.

After the war concluded with Germany's defeat, Feodora's father's rule over the Duchy of Saxe-Meiningen was ended. Her post-war life is mostly unknown, and records of her subsequent medical history have mainly been lost. She spent her final years at the Sanatorium Buchwald-Hohenwiese, near Hirschberg, Silesia, in what is now southwestern Poland. She died by suicide on 26 August 1945, killing herself shortly after World War II ended. In describing Feodora's life, the historian John Van der Kiste writes that "the princess who had so desperately wanted children of her own had instead continued to battle with constant physical ailments, insomnia and severe depression, and endured many years of ill-health similar to that of her mother".

== Medical analysis ==
In the 1990s, the historian John Röhl and his colleagues Martin Warren and David Hunt found Feodora's grave in Poland, exhuming the body for DNA analysis in the belief that it would reveal signs of the genetic disease porphyria. However, it was proved inconclusive.

== Ancestry ==
Ancestors of Princess Feodora of Saxe-Meiningen

8. Bernhard II, Duke of Saxe-Meiningen
4. George II, Duke of Saxe-Meiningen
9. Princess Marie Frederica of Hesse-Kassel
2. Bernhard III, Duke of Saxe-Meiningen
10. Prince Albert of Prussia
5. Princess Charlotte of Prussia
11. Princess Marianne of the Netherlands
1. Princess Feodora of Saxe-Meiningen
12. William I, German Emperor
6. Frederick III, German Emperor
13. Princess Augusta of Saxe-Weimar-Eisenach
3. Princess Charlotte of Prussia
14. Prince Albert of Saxe-Coburg and Gotha
7. Victoria, Princess Royal
15. Victoria of the United Kingdom
