= Christoph Röhl =

British-German filmmaker (born 1967)

Christoph Röhl (born 1967 in Brighton) is a British-German filmmaker.

== Early life and education ==
Christoph Röhl was born in Brighton to an English father, the historian John C. G. Röhl, and a German mother Rosemarie von Berg. He read History and German at the University of Manchester achieving a First Class Double Honours Degree.

== Career ==
Christoph Röhl studied film directing and scriptwriting at the Deutsche Film- und Fernsehakademie Berlin. His first short films received various international awards including the National German Film Award.

After a period directing films for the BBC and ITV, he was approached by Thomas Hoegh, a Norwegian investor and entrepreneur, to set up a film school in London. He took up the offer and co-founded the Met Film School, now located at Ealing Studios in London. Röhl was the school’s director for four years.

Röhl returned to Berlin to direct his first feature film, A Piece of Me (German: Ein Teil von mir), in 2007. The film received its premiere at the Shanghai Film Festival and was released in German cinemas in 2009. His next film was a documentary called We're Not The Only Ones (German: Und wir sind nicht die Einzigen). The film dealt with the child sex abuse scandal at the well-known Odenwaldschule. The film was nominated for a German TV Award in 2011 and won the Robert-Geisendörfer-Prize in 2012. In 2014 he directed the film The Chosen Ones (German: Die Auserwählten) with Ulrich Tukur and Julia Jentsch in the lead roles. It was nominated for the Prix Europa Award 2014 and won Best Film at the Zoom Festival in Barcelona.

In 2018 Röhl directed the docudrama Kaisersturz, which was broadcast on ZDF to coincide with the centenary of the abdication of Kaiser Wilhelm II and the end of the First World War. In the same year, Defender of the Faith (German: Verteidiger des Glaubens), a feature documentary about Cardinal Joseph Ratzinger's influence on the Catholic Church and the events leading to his historic resignation as Pope Benedict XVI in February 2013, was released in German cinemas. The film received its premier at the DOK.fest München. More than a mere portrait of Joseph Ratzinger, it is a portrayal of a whole system whose rigidity and inflexibility has led it into a cul-de-sac. He followed up the release of the film with the book „Nur die Wahrheit rettet: Der Missbrauch in der katholischen Kirche und das System Ratzinger“ (“Only the Truth will save us: Ratzinger and the abuse crisis in the Catholic Church"). The book, co-authored with Doris Reisinger, became a bestseller. According to the Neue Zürcher Zeitung, "(...) the authors are not concerned with apportioning blame. Their goal is to understand Ratzinger's mentality and actions and the tragic effect he had on the abuse crisis. It is difficult to escape the conclusions of their argument."

In 2014 he was presented with The World Childhood Foundation Award by Queen Sylvia of Sweden for "whose work to combat child abuse was recognized by the World Childhood Foundation".

== Filmography (selection) ==
- 2019 Defender of the Faith
- 2018 Kaisersturz
- 2014 The Chosen Ones (a.k.a. Die Auserwählten)
- 2013 Die Kita Frage
- 2011 We're not the Only Ones (a.k.a. Und wir sind nicht die Einzigen)
- 2008 A Piece of Me (a.k.a. Ein Teil von mir)
- 2006 Fast Learners
- 2005 Act Your Age
- 2002 Night & Day
- 2000 Butterfly World
- 2000 Close & True
- 1998 Fivefortyfive
- 1997 Der geklaute Spielplatz
- 1997 Der Nullenschlucker
- 1996 - The story of the Rubik’s Cube (Documentary)
- 1995 In Your Shoes

== Publications ==
- Nur die Wahrheit rettet, co-authored with Doris Reisinger, Piper 2021, ISBN 978-3-49207-069-0

== Awards ==
- 2015: Gold World Medal, New York Festivals
- 2014: Best Film, ZOOM Festival de Ficció Internacional TV, Barcelona
- 2014: First Prize, Youth Jury, ZOOM Festival de Ficció Internacional TV, Barcelona
- 2014: Prix Europa Television Prize Nomination
- 2014: The World Childhood Foundation Award
- 2012: Winner, Robert Geissendörfer Award
- 2011: Nominierung für den Deutschen Fernsehpreis: Und wir sind nicht die Einzigen in der Sparte „Beste Dokumentation“
- 2009: Jin Jue Award Nomination, Shanghai Int. Film Festival
- 2009: Best Youth Film, Fünf Seen Filmfestival
- 2009: Best Newcomer for actor Ludwig Trepte, Filmkunstfest M-V
- 2009: DEFA Förderpreis, Max Ophüls Filmfestival
- 2008: Eastman Kodak Prize Nomination, Hof International Film Festival
- 1999: Audience Award, Filmfest Regensburg
- 1999: Best Short Film, Filmfest Ludwigsburg
- 1999: Friedrich Wilhelm Murnau Prize
- 1996: Gold Plaque, Chicago International Film Festival
- 1998: First Prize, VFF Young Talent Award, Munich International Festival of Film Schools
- 1997: Erich Kästner Fernsehpreis
- 1997: Adolf Grimme Prize Nomination
- 1996: Mention Spéciale du Jury, Festival du Film Court de Brest (Brest European Short Film Festival)
- 1996: German Film Prize in Silver
- 1996: Special Mention of the Jury, Filmfestival Max Ophüls
- 1996: Best Short Film, Max-Ophüls Short Film Prize
- 1995: Jury Prize for Best Short Film, Munich International Festival of Film Schools
