= John C. G. Röhl =

British historian (1938–2023)

John Röhl
- Born: 31 May 1938; London, England, United Kingdom
- Died: 17 November 2023 (aged 85); Kingston, England, United Kingdom
- Education: University of Cambridge
- Occupations: Historian, Academic
- Employer: University of Sussex
- Known for: German History, Imperial History, Bismarck, WW1
- Title: Emeritus Professor
- Spouse: Rosemarie von Berg
- Children: Christoph and 2 others

John Charles Gerald Röhl (31 May 1938 – 17 November 2023) was a British historian notable for his work on Imperial Germany and European history.

== Early life ==
John Charles Gerald Röhl was born in the German Hospital in Dalston, east London, on 31 May 1938 to a German father, Hans-Gerhard Röhl, and an English mother, Freda Kingsford Woulfe-Brenan. She was the daughter of Captain Frederick Woulfe-Brenan, the Labour candidate standing against Nancy Astor in the Plymouth Sutton constituency in the general elections of 1922, 1923, and 1924, and of Saffie Beechey Kingsford, great‑granddaughter of the Georgian portrait painter Sir William Beechey.

At the outbreak of World War 2 in 1939, John Röhl was taken by his parents first to Forst on the River Neisse in eastern Germany and then to Pécs in southern Hungary. His first languages were Hungarian and German. After the arrest of his father by the SS in late July 1944, the family moved to the relative safety of the remote Hungarian countryside, but in January 1945 with the imminent approach of the Red Army, Freda Röhl and her by then three children joined the stream of refugees heading westwards back to Germany. They were eventually reunited with Gerhard Röhl, who had been conscripted into a punishment battalion on the Russian front, in Ziegenrück in Thuringia, where they were liberated by the US Army led by General George Patton.

After the Potsdam Conference, the Americans offered the family safe passage from the Soviet Zone of Occupation to their headquarters in Frankfurt-am-Main, where Gerhard Röhl became an interpreter and later the headmaster of the Helmholtz-Gymnasium, a large grammar school for boys. Freda Röhl returned to England with her two daughters in December 1945; John Röhl was sent under the auspices of the Red Cross to an international children's home in Adelboden, Switzerland. He was reunited with his mother and sisters in Manchester in December 1946.

== Education ==
Röhl attended Seymour Park Primary School and Stretford Grammar School, from where he won a state scholarship and a place to read History at Corpus Christi College, Cambridge. Before going up to Cambridge in 1958, he completed his national service as an airframe mechanic in the Royal Air Force stationed at RAF Geilenkirchen on the German–Dutch border near Aachen. At Cambridge, Röhl achieved a First on both Parts of the Historical Tripos and in 1961 went on to work for a PhD under the supervision of Professor Sir Harry Hinsley. He spent the academic year 1962–1963 in the archives of West and East Germany researching the history of Imperial Germany in the aftermath of Bismarck's fall from power in 1890. The dissertation was published under the title Germany without Bismarck: The Crisis of Government in the Second German Reich, 1890–1900 in 1967 and in German translation in 1969.

== Life and career ==
Röhl was appointed to a Lectureship in History in the School of European Studies at the then new University of Sussex at Brighton in 1964. He was promoted to Reader and in 1979 Professor of European History. Between 1982 and 1985 he served as Dean of the School of European Studies. He also taught Modern European History at the University of Hamburg and at the University of Freiburg. He was elected to a Fellowship of the Alexander von Humboldt Foundation in 1970, at the Historisches Kolleg in Munich in 1986–87, the Woodrow Wilson International Center for Scholars at Washington in 1989–90, the Institute for Advanced Study at Princeton in 1994, and the National Humanities Center in North Carolina in 1997–98. He was given emeritus status by the University of Sussex in 1999.

Röhl died from prostate cancer in Kingston on 17 November 2023, at the age of 85.

=== Works ===
After Germany Without Bismarck (1967), Röhl edited the political correspondence of Philipp, Prince of Eulenburg (1847–1921), the closest friend of Kaiser Wilhelm II until his fall from grace in a series of scandals in 1907–1909, in three volumes under the auspices of the Historical Commission of the Bavarian Academy of Sciences. This edition, published in the series Deutsche Geschichtsquellen des 19. und 20. Jahrhunderts between 1976 and 1983, broke new ground, demonstrating the personal power wielded by the Kaiser, his court and his favourites as distinct from the state institutions in the monarchical-military system that had been bequeathed by Bismarck. A conference organised by Röhl, together with the cultural anthropologist Nicolaus Sombart in the Kaiser's palace on the island of Corfu in September 1979, marked the beginning of a shift in German historiography away from structuralism towards a greater interest in personalities, relationships, cultural assumptions, human emotions and the archival sources that reflected them. The conference papers, edited by Röhl and Sombart, were published by Cambridge University Press in 1982 under the title Kaiser Wilhelm II – New Interpretations: The Corfu Papers. A collection of essays on Wilhelm II and aspects of governance in Imperial Germany then followed entitled Kaiser, Hof und Staat (1987) and The Kaiser and his Court (1994) respectively.

In 1981, Röhl began further archival research for what was to become a three-volume biography of Kaiser Wilhelm II, published in German by the C. H. Beck Verlag in Munich between 1993 and 2008, and in English translation by Cambridge University Press between 1998 and 2014. The biography, which was awarded the Einhard Prize for European Biography in 2013, is considered an important contribution to the ongoing controversy on the origins of the First World War. A much briefer study of the Kaiser, Queen Victoria's eldest grandchild, has appeared under the title Kaiser Wilhelm II 1859–1941: A Concise Life (Cambridge University Press 2014).

In 1996, in collaboration with the geneticists Martin J. Warren and David Hunt, John Röhl exhumed the remains of the Kaiser's sister Charlotte Hereditary Princess of Saxe-Meiningen in Thuringia and her daughter Princess Feodora of Reuss in Poland. The analysis of their DNA showed that both women, a granddaughter and great-granddaughter of Queen Victoria respectively, had suffered from a form of the dominant genetic disorder porphyria variegata, so demonstrating the validity of the theory advanced earlier by Ida Macalpine and Richard Hunter that this illness had been the probable cause of George III's "madness". These findings were published in the book Purple Secret: Genes, 'Madness' and the Royal Houses of Europe (1998).

== Publications ==
- Germany Without Bismarck: The Crisis of Government in the Second Reich 1890–1900, 1967.

- Deutschland ohne Bismarck. Die Regierungskrise im Zweiten Kaiserreich 1890–1900, 1969.

- From Bismarck to Hitler: The Problem of Continuity in German History, January 1970.
- 1914: Delusion or Design? The Testimony of Two German Diplomats, 1973.
- Philipp Eulenburgs Politische Korrespondenz, 3 vols., 1976–1983.
- Kaiser Wilhelm II – New Interpretations: The Corfu Papers, 1982.
- Kaiser, Hof und Staat: Wilhelm II. und die deutsche Politik, 1987.

- The Kaiser and His Court: Wilhelm II and the Government of Germany, 1994.

- Der Ort Kaiser Wilhelms II. in der deutschen Geschichte, 1991.
- Purple Secret: Genes, 'Madness' and the Royal Houses of Europe (co-authored with Martin Warren & David Hunt), 1998.
- Wilhelm II. Die Jugend des Kaisers 1859–1888, 1993.

- Young Wilhelm: The Kaiser's Early Life, 1859–1888, 1998.

- Wilhelm II. Der Aufbau der Persönlichen Monarchie 1888–1900, 2001.

- Wilhelm II: The Kaiser's Personal Monarchy, 1888–1900, August 2004.

- Wilhelm II. Der Weg in den Abgrund 1900–1941, 2008.

- Wilhelm II: Into the Abyss of War and Exile, 1900–1941, April 2014.

- Kaiser Wilhelm II 1859–1941: A Concise Life, 2014.
