= Odenwaldschule =

Former school in Heppenheim, Germany

Coordinates: 49°39′58″N 8°41′12″E

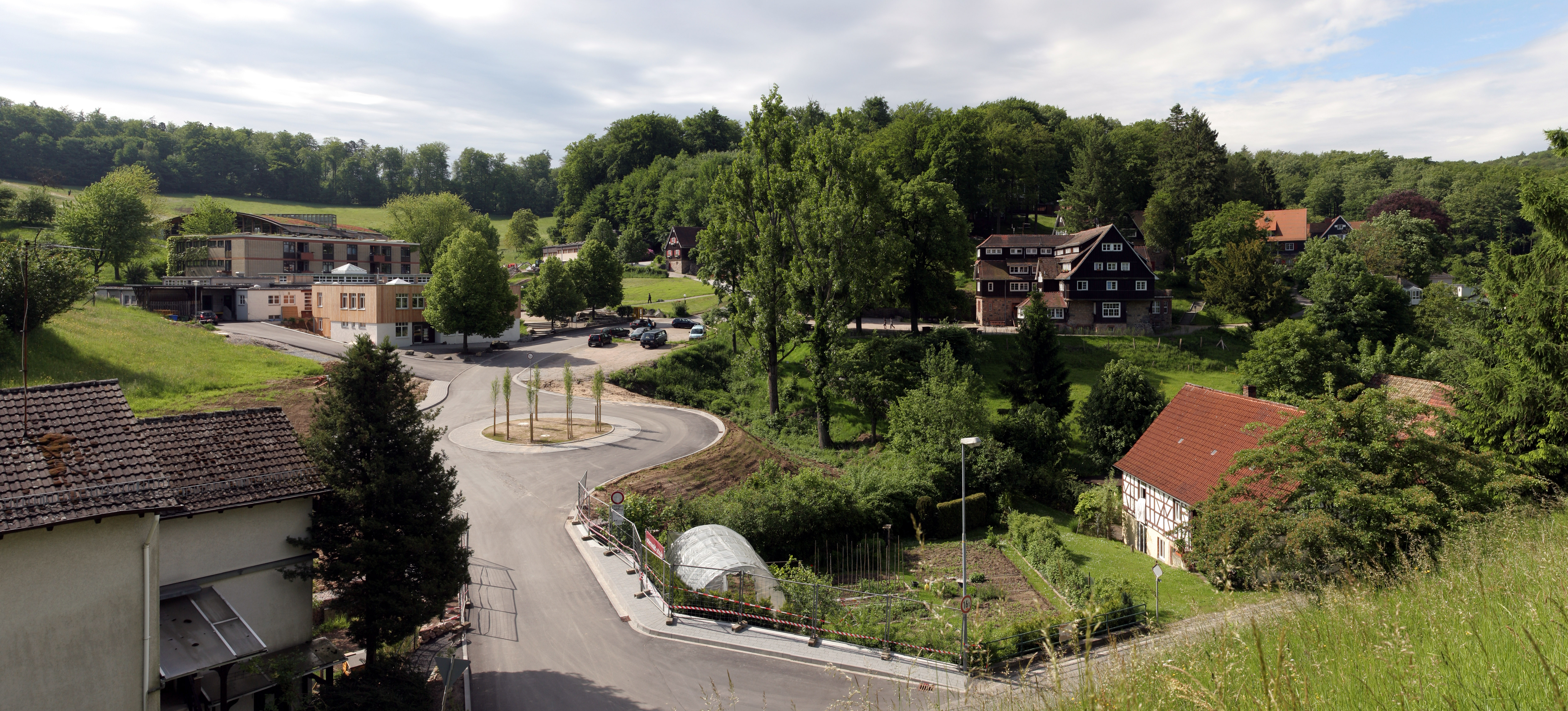
Odenwaldschule in Heppenheim

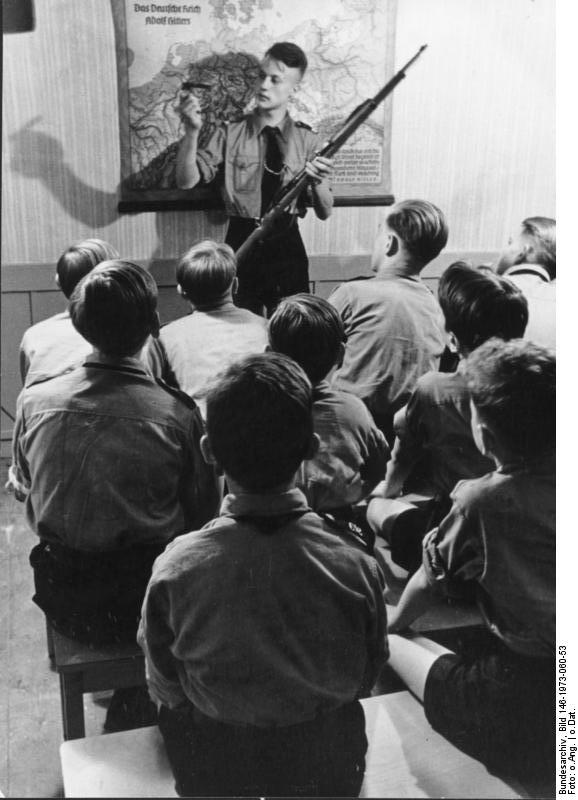
Political instruction at the Odenwaldschule during the Nazi era

The Odenwaldschule was a German school located in Heppenheim in the Odenwald. Founded in 1910, it was Germany's oldest Landerziehungsheim, a private boarding school located in a rural setting. Edith and Paul Geheeb established it using their concept of progressive education, which integrated the work of the head and hand. The school went bankrupt and was closed in 2015, following the revelation of numerous cases of sexual abuse of students.

== History and educational concept ==
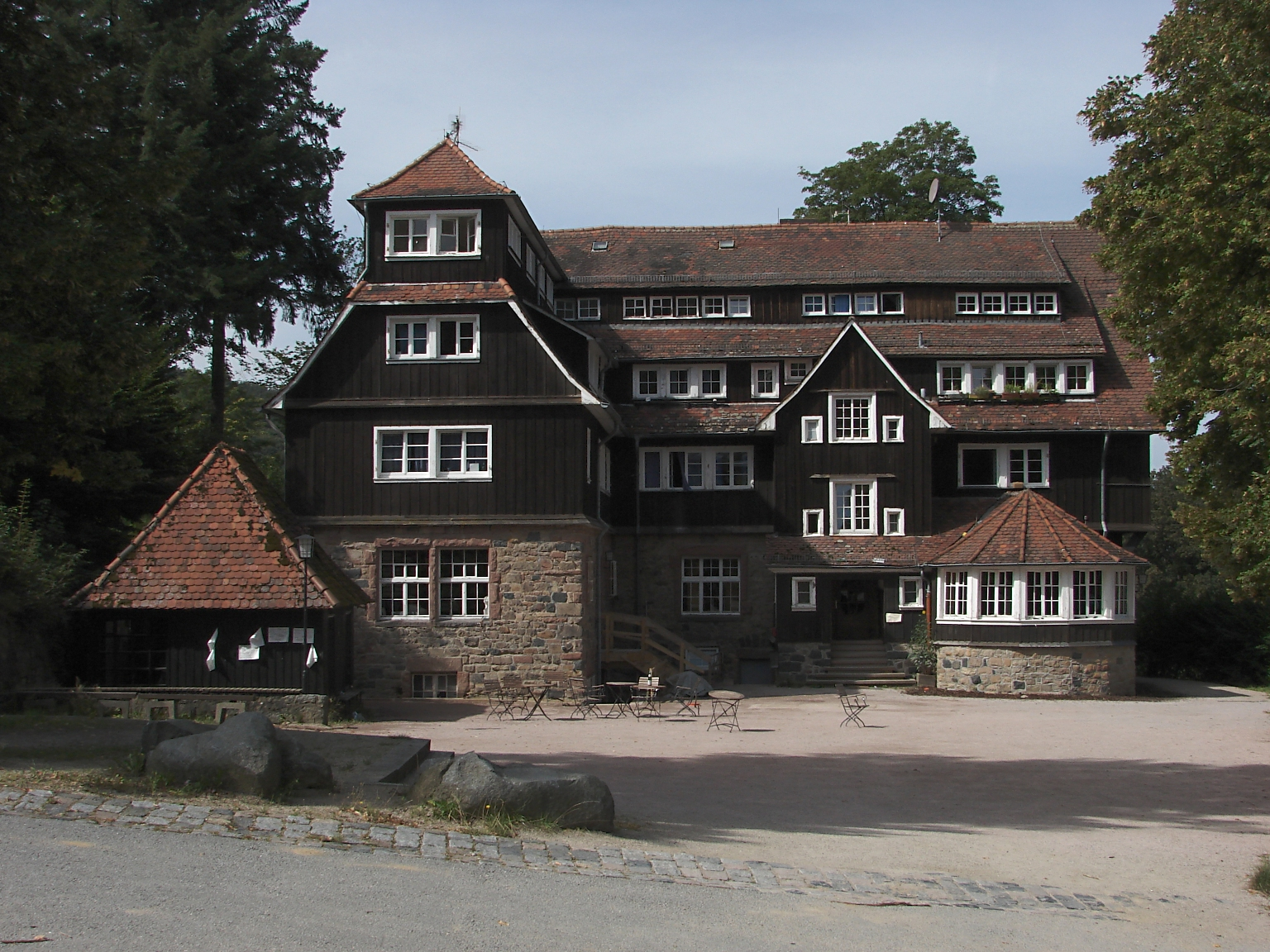
The Goethehaus at the Odenwaldschule

The Odenwaldschule was founded by Paul and Edith Geheeb on 14 April 1910, emerging as part of the reformed education movement at the beginning of the 20th century. Edith Geheeb's father, Max Cassirer, was the town councilmember for Berlin, and supported the founding of the school, financing the land purchase and the buildings.

Geheeb felt inspired by the phrase "be who you are" (Γένοιο οἷος ἔσσι.) from the Greek poet Pindar. Thus the school was to promote community, personality and self-determined actions. To begin with, there were only 14 students, all housed in the main building, the Goethehaus.

The founders' concept was originally based on the fundamentals of the work schools, for example in the introduction of a course system and the dispensation with year groups, and the idea that all students should be able to co-create, participate, and be equally responsible. The school rules underpinned this philosophy, reading "The Odenwaldschule is a free community, in which the different generations treat each other impartially and can learn from each other". Where possible, students received individual learning stimuli such as intellectual, practical, musical and artistic learning methods, and academic learning was connected with vocational training. Students lived in a mixed-age living area, headed by a teacher, and rearranged every year. Being on an informal basis with the teacher was a further unusual characteristics of the school's educational concept, long before the mainstream emergence of anti-authoritarian schooling.

In the 1920s the school was internationally recognised, and until 1938 teachers from other countries, including England and the United States, taught there. From 1924 until 1932 the educator Martin Wagenschein worked at the school. In 1934, Paul and Edith Geheeb emigrated to Switzerland with around 25 students and some teachers and formed the Ecole d'Humanité. In 1939 the Reicharbeitsdienst (Reich Labour Service of the National Socialist government) requested the takeover of the Odenwaldschule as it contradicted the "concept of the national socialistic schooling community."

After the war, the school was run by Minna Specht from 1946 to 1951. In the years following the Second World War, the school's teaching system was reformed many times. In 1963 it became a UNESCO ASPNet project. The school was a member of the Schulverbund Blick über den Zaun (literally: School Union - view over the fence).

== Integrated Comprehensive School ==
The Odenwaldschule was an integrated comprehensive school. It was possible to take a metalwork vocational course or a chemistry assistant course with a state qualification, alongside a technical diploma or the full Abitur.

=== Life at the Odenwaldschule ===
There were approximately 250 school places, although the number of students fluctuated. At the end of 2011, there were roughly 200 students at the Odenwaldschule. In 2010 almost half of the students came from the state of Hesse, one fifth came directly from the Bergstraße district, and "almost a third were state supported children." Most of the students lived at the boarding school in family-like groups of six to ten people. The average class size was 17 students. Roughly half of the 120 employees were teachers at the school.

=== Costs ===
A boarding school place cost 2.370 € (as of the 2012/13 academic year), and there were additional fees for vocational courses. External students paid a lower amount.

== Abuse Cases ==
Official school letters, found in archives and reviewed in a dissertation, point to sexual abuse of girls and boys under the management of school founders Paul and Edith Geheeb. However no one contacted the police.

In 1998 reports from former students were made public, according to which the then-headmaster Gerold Becker had sexually abused multiple students in the 1970s to the 1980s. Andreas Huckele, a former student, who attended Odenwaldschule from 1981 to 1988 and was later protected by the Frankfurter Rundschau with the pseudonym Jürgen Dehmers, had sent two letters to headmaster Wolfgang Harder in June 1998.

The school explained in 1998 that the former headmaster had never contradicted "the victim's statements when he had to meet with the board of directors and vacated his functions and duties". In 1998 the victims of sexual abuse met with the former headteacher Harder and the former SPD-MP Peter Conradi - as the vice-president of the sponsoring organisation - and agreed to review the abuse accusations, but this did not happen as promised.

In the late 1990s, and again in 2010, the school became the center of national attention when an investigation revealed the sexual abuse of more than 130 pupils by at least 8 teachers in the 1970s and 1980s.

=== Review ===
One year later the Darmstadt prosecution service dismissed the penal case review due to statutory limitations. When Jörg Schindler reported the accusations in the Frankfurter Rundschau in November 1999, Florian Lindermann, the spokesman for the former students, criticized the coverage as over the top.

In 2010 Margarita Kaufmann, headmistress at the school since 2007, called for a new inquiry into the sex abuse cases. Kaufmann spoke of 33 victims that she knew of, and eight teachers that she believed were guilty of sexual assault between 1966 and 1991; it was assumed that more than ten teachers were perpetrators. The music teacher Wolfgang Held, who died in 2006, was named as the main perpetrator alongside Becker. The Frankfurter Rundschau daily newspaper reported on 6 March 2010 that they believed that there had been between 50 and 100 victims. The Darmstadt prosecution service dismissed six of the 13 preliminary proceedings. At the end of May 2010 the prosecution service investigated six former teachers and one student. There was no court ruling until the end of 2012.

In a letter sent by Gerold Becker to the Odenwaldschule community in March 2010, he asked his victims for forgiveness and renewed his offer to come forward and speak to the victims. Becker died on 7 July 2010 without suffering legal consequences.

The board of directors at the Odenwaldschule initially rejected the idea of financial compensation for the victims in a July 2010 letter. In September 2010, however, the board of directors promised financial compensation for 50 former students who were affected. Additionally, there remained further unresolved cases requiring review.

The lawyers Claudia Burgsmüller and Brigitte Tilmann were entrusted with the task of reviewing the sex abuse cases in 2010. According to the final report, released on 17 December 2010, at least 132 students were victims of attack by teachers between 1965 and 1998. The lawyers who wrote the report said the documentation was incomplete.

In March 2011 Christian Füller's monograph, entitled Sündenfall. Wie die Reformschule ihre Ideale missbrauchte (literally: "The Fall from Grace. How the Reform School Abused its Ideals"), was published. Füller calls the school, when it was under Becker's management, a "reformed education paradise with a torture chamber in the basement" based on the model of an "aristocratic patriarchy". He speaks of paedophiles and "robbers of childhood", which had systematically taken over the part of the school.

Two months later Tilman Jens, a former student and until the summer of 2014 a member of the Odenwaldschule's sponsoring organisation, published the book Freiwild. Die Odenwaldschule - Ein Lehrstück von Tätern und Opfern. (literally: "Fair game. The Odenwaldschule - a lesson of attackers and victims.") Jens demanded more balanced coverage: contrary to the customs of the constitutional state also innocent people were denounced as assailants or co-assailants. In October 2014 an article of in Deutschlandfunk reported him as saying that even if the film Die Auserwählten (The Favored Few) was filmed at the Odenwaldschule -showing a willingness on the part of school's management to confront the history of misconduct -it failed in previous years to reach further resolutions.

In September 2010 several victims formed a group called Glasbrechen (literally - breaking of glass), with the goal of helping people who had experienced sexual, physical and psychological attacks.

In July 2011 the former headmistress Kaufmann resigned from her office to focus on the review of the sexual abuse cases. In 2011 the club Odenwaldschule e.V. with the Altschülervereinigung und Förderkreis der Odenwaldschule e.V. (literally: "Association of former students and society for promotion of the Odenwaldschule") formed the foundation "Brücken bauen" (literally "building bridges"). According to its charter the foundation carries out and supports measures to aid victims of sexual violence, physical, psychological abuse at the Odenwaldschule.

A fierce critic of the legal review process is Andreas Huckele, who published his book Wie laut soll ich denn noch schreien?, under a pseudonym. In his acceptance speech for winning the Geschwister-Scholl-Preis in 2012 he criticized the lack of action taken by the school since the first article was published in the Frankfurter Runschau in 1999.

== Teachers and management dismissed because of child pornography ==
On 9 April 2014 a teacher, who taught and lived at the school from 2011, had their room searched by the authorities. The teacher admitted to having downloaded child pornography before his appointment at the Odenwaldschule. He was immediately dismissed from teaching at the school. The district administrator Matthias Wilkes criticised the school's management because they had not adhered to promised transparency.

After this incident, in June 2014, the headmaster Däschler-Seiler handed in his resignation. In July 2014, the sponsoring organisation dismissed the entire management.

== Attempts to save the Odenwaldschule ==
In February 2015, Gerhard Herbert, as chairman of the sponsoring organisation, introduced a new management team consisting of the boarding school's headteacher Sonya Mayoufi and manager Marcus Halfen-Kieper. The new management team tried to rebuild trust in the Odenwaldschule. Additionally the school's sponsorship was to be transferred to a foundation and a not-for-profit private limited company. The new management team were to take over the running of the organization that summer, but the sponsoring organisation dismissed the team on 27 July 2015 after unspecified disputes.

=== Closure of the school ===
The sponsoring organisation publicly announced on 25 April 2015 that it had not succeeded in securing the finances for continued operation, after a large part of the trust funded by former students had been spent. This meant the definite end of the school. The remaining time until the next academic year was used to wind down all school operations and to move the students to other schools, according to Vice District Administrator Schimpf. "The school is where it is now through its own mistakes, its own structures, by turning a blind eye and ducking away, through its own non-action", the head of the management team, Marcus Halfen-Kieper, explained. "We could and should neither try to blame the responsibility for the situation on the media nor the regulators or the politics nor even the victims of sexual assault at the school."

Parents and students fought to keep the school open. On 30 May 2015, the chairman of the sponsoring organisation resigned after temporarily giving up the reins to the new management team on 17 May 2015. The school, parents, and former students hoped to attract financing for the next two academic years by setting up a trust, but were not successful.

On 16 June 2015, the sponsoring organisation declared itself bankrupt and in September 2015, the school was permanently closed.

In 2016, the inventory of the school (furniture, tools and the library) were sold by public auction, and the school's archive was given to a public archive in Darmstadt for preservation. Months later, the buildings were sold to an entrepreneur from Mannheim. Also in 2016, a group consisting of parents and donors who wanted to reopen the school under a new name ("Schuldorf Lindenstein") declared the end of their efforts.

=== Future plans ===
According to the purchaser of the school's buildings, the buildings are planned to be renovated and established as a housing complex, a holiday park and a historical museum following the acquisition of adjacent land. The new amenities are planned to provide space for 300 people and will be named "Wohnpark Ober-Hambach".

== Notable alumni ==
- Hans Bethe
- Daniel Cohn-Bendit
- Nigel Dennis
- Amelie Fried
- Klaus Gysi
- Wolfgang Hildesheimer
- Felicitas Kukuck
- Klaus Mann
- Emiel van Moerkerken
- Sandra Nettelbeck (daughter of Uwe Nettelbeck)
- Konstantin Neven DuMont
- Rosalinde von Ossietzky-Palm (daughter of Carl von Ossietzky)
- Wolfgang Porsche
- Dankwart Rustow
- Rudolf Ritsema
- Ari Up
- Andreas von Weizsäcker (son of Richard von Weizsäcker)
- Oda Schottmüller
- Beate Uhse-Rotermund

== Notable staff and teachers ==
- Fridolin Friedmann
- Alois Kottmann
- Alfred Landé
- Peter Suhrkamp
- Minna Specht
- Martin Wagenschein
- Wolfgang Hildemann

== See also ==
- Landschulheim Herrlingen

== In film ==
- Und wir sind nicht die Einzigen. Director: Christoph Röhl; Produzenten: Dirk Wilutzky, Anja Wedell; Redakteure: Inge Classen, Udo Bremer. Eine Produktion von Herbstfilm im Auftrag von 3Sat 2011, 85 min
- Geschlossene Gesellschaft.
- Die Auserwählten. Director: Christoph Röhl
