= Rudolf Ritsema =

Rudolf Ritsema (3 October 1918, Velp, Gelderland – 8 May 2006) was the director of the Fondazione Eranos (Eranos Foundation) for over thirty years and the editor of the Eranos‑Jahrbuch serial (beginning with its vol. 38 published in 1972). Together with Shantena Augusto Sabbadini (b. 1943), the Italian physicist and spiritual thinker, he produced the first Italian rendering of the I Ching based directly on the Chinese original.

== Biography ==
Ritsema was born at Velp near Rheden in the Netherlands to the family of Ipo Christiaan Ritsema, whose ancestors hailed from Friesland, and his wife Frances Johanna, née Van den Berg, who was partly of Frisian, partly of British and Huguenot origin. From his mother and from maternal grandmother Ritsema inherited a religious disposition and a sense of being guided in life by God – indeed, of being carried in God's arms. Ritsema's father on the other hand, trained in chemistry and pursuing an abiding interest in biology, was by temperament a scientist and a rationalist thinker.

At the age of 11 Ritsema entered the Odenwaldschule in Heppenheim, Germany, whose founders, Paul and Edith Geheeb, were to exert a profound influence on him. Upon the accession of the Nazis to power in Germany the Geheebs relocated to Switzerland, where they founded an alternative to their Odenwaldschule, the École d'humanité, and it was here that Ritsema met, towards the end of the course of his studies, his future wife, Catherine Gris, a young music teacher from Geneva. (They eventually married on 8 May 1945, when Ritsema was 26.)

After leaving the École d'humanité and subsequently obtaining his bachelor's degree Ritsema enrolled in the University of Geneva, but soon financial difficulties intervened as the outbreak of the Second World War put an end to the flow of money from the Netherlands. Ritsema then worked at odd jobs to support himself, but continued voraciously to read on his own, particularly in French and German literatures, Tibetan Buddhism, and in Jungian psychology.

In 1944 Ritsema and Catherine Gris began psychoanalysis under Alwine von Keller, whom Ritsema had previously encountered at the Odenwaldschule (where she worked as an English-literature teacher). It was von Keller who would now introduce him to the I Ching.

One year after his marriage to Catherine Gris, Ritsema removed with his wife to the Netherlands, where he obtained the position of Head of the Oriental department in the antiquarian division of E.J. Brill, a renowned bookselling and publishing company based in Leyden: there he became adept at buying and selling libraries of scholars and rare‑book collectors. During the weekends he would carry on with his I Ching research.

In the summer of 1947, at the age of 28, Ritsema contracted poliomyelitis, a condition which entailed, in his case, diaphragm paralysis and which brought him to the threshold of death. Although he survived, the disease left him paralysed from the waist down. The following winter, at the suggestion of a neurologist who had recommended a warmer climate, the Ritsemas spent a month on the shores of Lake Maggiore, near Ascona in Switzerland, where Alwine von Keller had taken up residence at the Casa Shanti: the place happened to be situated next door to the Casa Gabriella, the house of the founder of Eranos, Olga Froebe-Kapteyn (1881–1962). Froebe developed a liking for the Ritsemas and invited them to stay the next winter at the Casa Eranos. From then on the Ritsemas would spend a month every year as Froebe's guests, and a warm friendship developed among them (Froebe was also deeply interested in the I Ching).

In 1956 Ritsema began to collaborate with Froebe and the Swiss zoologist and natural philosopher Adolf Portmann (1897–1982) in the planning of the Eranos Conferences. Five years later Olga Froebe‑Kapteyn named Portmann and the Ritsemas as her successors entrusted to carry on the work of Eranos. However, when Froebe died in April 1962, the organizational work for the Eranos sessions fell squarely on the shoulders of Rudolf Ritsema, and from 1962 to 1982, the year of Portmann's death, the Ritsemas were single-handedly responsible for keeping the tradition of the Eranos Conferences alive.

In his spare time Ritsema pursued his research into the I Ching, which reached a turning point around 1971 when he grew dissatisfied with the critical apparatus in the Wilhelm translation, and conceived the idea of an entirely new translation. This took twenty years to materialize, but was aided in its progress by various scholars, notably James Hillman and Robert Hinshaw (co‑founder of the Daimon Verlag of Einsiedeln, Switzerland). Towards the end of the 1980s the American poet Stephen L. Karcher assisted Ritsema in bringing the work to completion.

The year 1988 marked a new departure for Eranos as Ritsema took the radical and in the event controversial decision to change the basic structure of the Eranos Conferences, electing to turn the meetings into a spiritual laboratory of an experimental character involving personal engagement of the participants. He also put the I Ching at the centre of Eranos activities.

In the early 1990s Ritsema passed on the presidency of the Fondazione Eranos (Eranos Foundation) to the Jungian analyst, Christa Robinson. He died on 8 May 2006, at the age of 87, on the 61st anniversary of his marriage to Catherine Gris.

== Publications ==
- Rudolf Ritsema, 'The Ethic of the Image'; in Stephen Karcher, ed., The Yi ching and the Ethic of the Image: Papers presented at the 1992 Round Table Session sponsored by the Eranos Foundation, the Uehiro Foundation on Ethics and Education (Putnam, Connecticut, Spring Journal, 1993).
- I ching: The Classic Chinese Oracle of Change: The First Complete Translation with Concordance, translated by Rudolf Ritsema and Stephen Karcher (Shaftesbury, Dorset, Element, 1994).
- I ching: il libro della versatilità, translated from the Chinese by Rudolf Ritsema and Shantena Augusto Sabbadini (Turin, Unione tipografico-editrice torinese, 1997).
- Yi‑jing: das Buch der Wandlungen; die einzige vollständige Ausgabe der altchinesischen Orakeltexte mit Konkordanz..., translated by Rudolf Ritsema and Hansjakob Schneider (Frankfurt am Main, Zweitausendeins, 2000).
- The Original I Ching Oracle: The Pure and Complete Texts with Concordance, translated by Rudolf Ritsema and Shantena Augusto Sabbadini (London, Watkins Publishing, 2005).

== See also ==
- Eranos
- Erich Heller
