= Martin Wagenschein =

Science educator

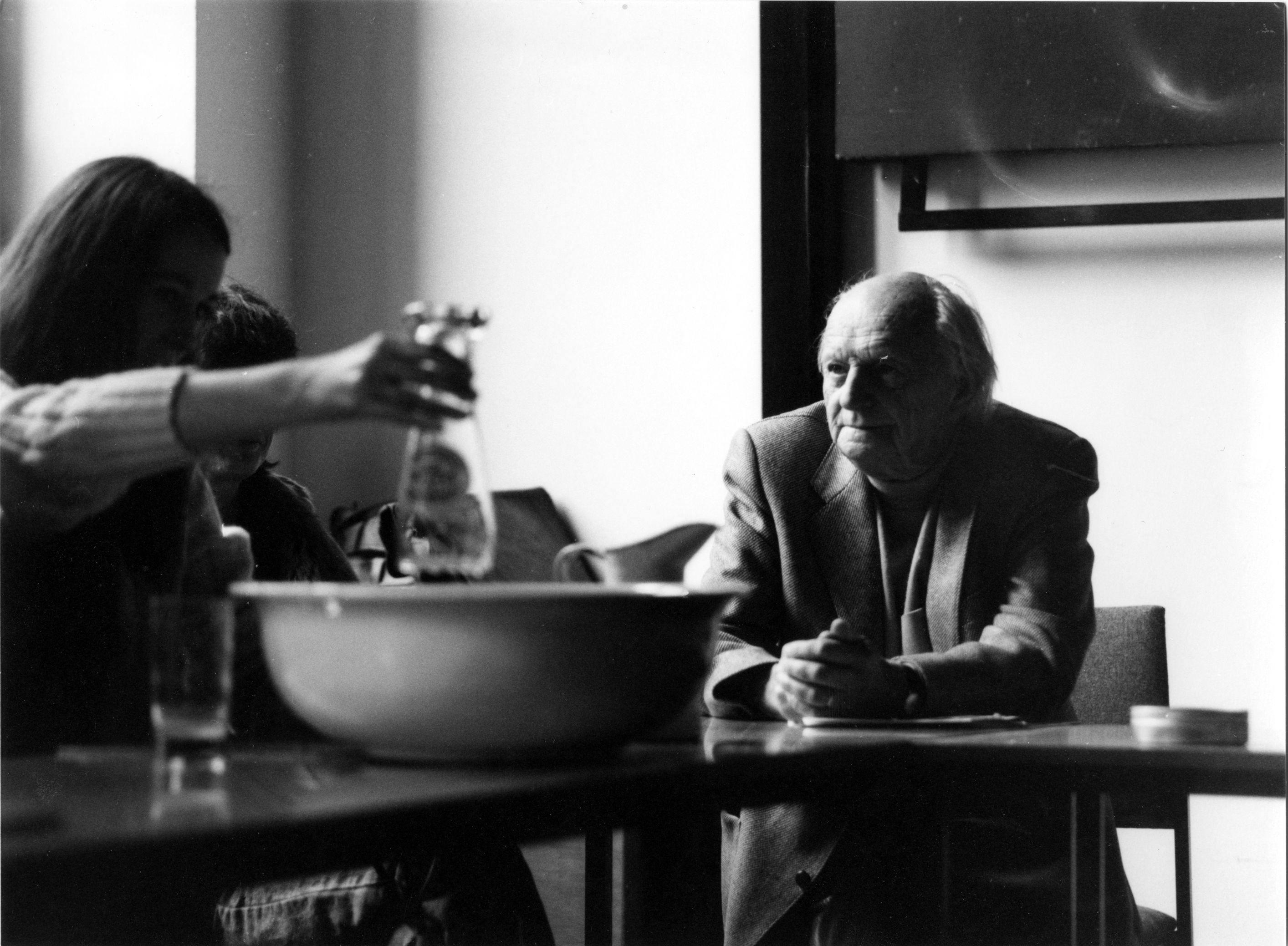
Martin Wagenschein

Martin Wagenschein (3 December 1896, in Gießen, in Germany – 3 April 1988, in Trautheim) was a science educator who worked in mathematical and scientific didactics.

Wagenschein is best known for his promotion of open learning techniques. He emphasised the importance of teaching students to understand rather than simply learning knowledge for its own sake. As such he was one of precursors of modern teaching techniques such as constructivism, inquiry-based science, and inquiry learning.

His work is little known in the English speaking world and little of it has been translated. Despite this, he sets the foundation for modern open learning techniques, mirroring the work of English-speaking science educationists such as John Dewey.

== The Wagenschein Effect ==
Wagenschein discovered that even highly educated people, and even students of physics, could not provide a realistic or simple explanation for even the most basic physical phenomena, despite being well qualified to do so, or being able to do so only with the use of complicated equations or language that is difficult to understand. One example of this is students asked to explain why the moon's phases occurred in the order that they did; another is students who are unable to explain in simple easy-to-understand language how to describe the speed at which objects fall. This phenomenon became known as The Wagenschein Effect. This effect is most prominent when people are unable to understand what appears to be basic scientific knowledge, hedged in scientific or overly complicated language.

== Books and works ==
- Bildung durch Naturwissenschaft (1930)
- Naturwissenschaft und Bildung (1932/33)
- Zur erzieherischen Aufgabe des mathematisch-naturwissenschaftlichen Unterrichts (1933/34)
- Physikalischer Unterricht und Intellektualismus (1935)
- Zusammenhänge der Naturkräfte (1937)
- Natur physikalisch gesehen (1953)
- Die Erde unter den Sternen (1955)
- Zum Begriff des Exemplarischen Lehrens (1956)
- Die Pädagogische Dimension der Physik (1962)
- Ursprüngliches Verstehen und exaktes Denken (2 Bände, 1965/67)
- Verstehen lehren. Genetisch - Sokratisch - Exemplarisch (1968)
- Rettet die Phänomene, mit Hugo Kükelhaus (1975)
- Kinder auf dem Wege zur Physik (1990)
- Naturphänomene sehen und verstehen (1995)
