= House of Solms =

Former German noble family

Original arms of the House of Solms

The House of Solms is a historic German noble family of the Hochadel (high nobility), whose members have historically held the ranks of Imperial Count and Imperial Prince. Since circa. 1100, the seat of the Edelherren of Solms was Solms Castle in the Burgsolms district of today's city Solms. The current House of Solms most likely descend, via the Counts of Luxembourg, from the powerful House of Ardenne and are thus among the oldest European noble families.

In the High and Late Middle Ages the house managed with difficulty to maintain their regional position against their powerful neighbours Nassau and Hesse. They later inherited extensive areas in the Wetterau. Despite fragmentation, they emerged from the territorial conflicts as a family of supra-regional importance. In 1806, the House of Solms was mediatised. Until the legal abolition of the nobility's prerogatives in 1919, its members were counted among the mediatised houses and were considered "equals" for dynastic purposes to other reigning houses of Europe.

== History ==
The existing certificates and documents do not allow a clear determination of the origins of the Solms family, meaning there are various theories about the origin of the family. This was sought for a long time at the Counts of Nassau, but this is questionable. Current research most closely follows the assumption of the historian Friedrich Uhlhorn, according to which the County of Solms emerged from the old County of Gleiberg in terms of territorial history.

The oldest property (Allod) of the nobles of Solms was in the north in the Königsberg/Hohensolms/Frankenbach area (Adelsmark Bensburg) and in the south on the Solmsbach near Burgsolms. Originally appointed as bailiffs of the Prince-Bishopric of Worms in the Solms and Iserbach valleys, they succeeded in appropriating this area. In 1129, Edelherr Marquardus de Sulmese was named for the first time as a witness in the foundation deed of the Schiffenberg Monastery, making him the first documented member of the House of Solms. His daughter and heir married Count Otto, co-heir of the County of Gleiberg, who then took her name and is to be regarded as the progenitor of the House of Solms. In this way, the House of Solms acquired the rights of counts and, together with the Lords of Merenberg and the Counts Palatine of Tübingen, inherited the inheritance of the Counts of Luxembourg-Gleiberg in the middle Lahn Valley. In 1212, an unspecified Count Heinrich also appears in the documents. Since the document refers to goods in Oberweidbach, in Erdagau, which was dominated by the House of Solms, he can also be assigned to the family. However, it is not known what relationship he had to Otto. Furthermore, Counts Heinrich and Marquard of Solms, brothers, are mentioned in 1226. They are considered Otto's grandchildren.

Around 1250 the county was divided into the territories Solms-Burgsolms (until 1415), Solms-Königsberg (until 1363) and Solms-Braunfels. During the High Middle Ages, an important goal of the Solms people was to gain control over the Cologne High Military and Escort Road. The road led from Frankfurt via Wetzlar to Cologne, and ran through the Solms area. Other goals were control over Altenberg Abbey near Wetzlar as well as over the imperial city of Wetzlar itself, which involved them in feuds with neighboring dynasts, especially in the 14th century.

=== Early lines ===
==== Burgsolms ====
Around the year 1100, the nobles of Solms established their seat in Burgsolms. The Solms family, who bore the title of count since 1223, expanded a fortified farmstead inhabited by a family member, into a water castle. In 1376, Count Johann IV of Solms-Burgsolms took advantage of the unrest within Wetzlar to take control of the city. Emperor Charles IV had commissioned him to reinstate the old council, but the count instead took control of the city himself. It was not until 1379 that the people of Wetzlar were able to expel Johann again. In 1384, after another feud with the free imperial city Wetzlar, the strongly fortified castle was besieged by the First Rhenish League at their instigation. Johann fled to the neighbouring Greifenstein Castle. Solms' ancestral castle was destroyed by the city association and not rebuilt. When the Solms-Burgsolm line died out in 1415 with Johann, their entire property fell to only remaining line, located in Braunfels Castle.

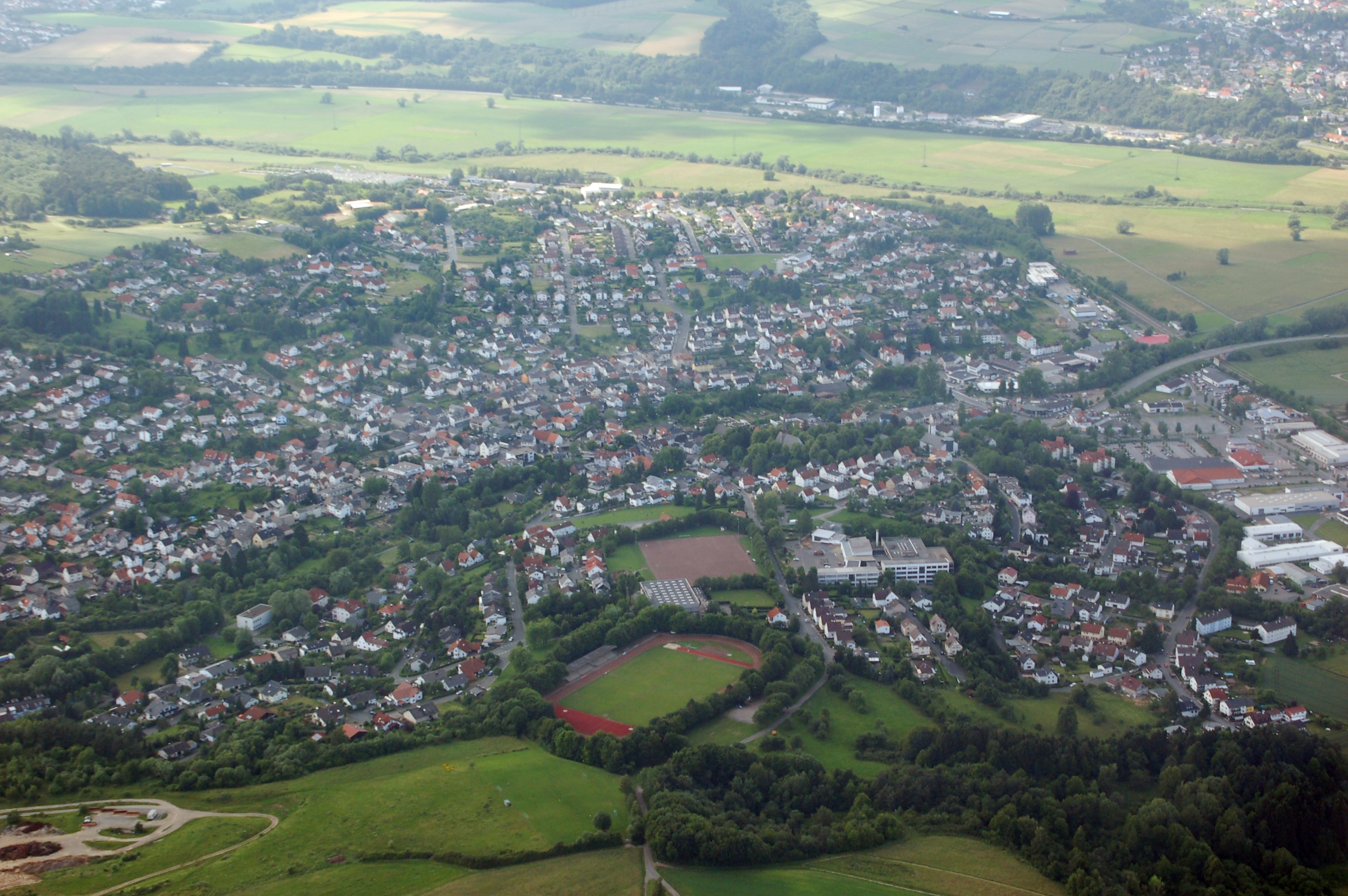
Burgsolms, Hesse

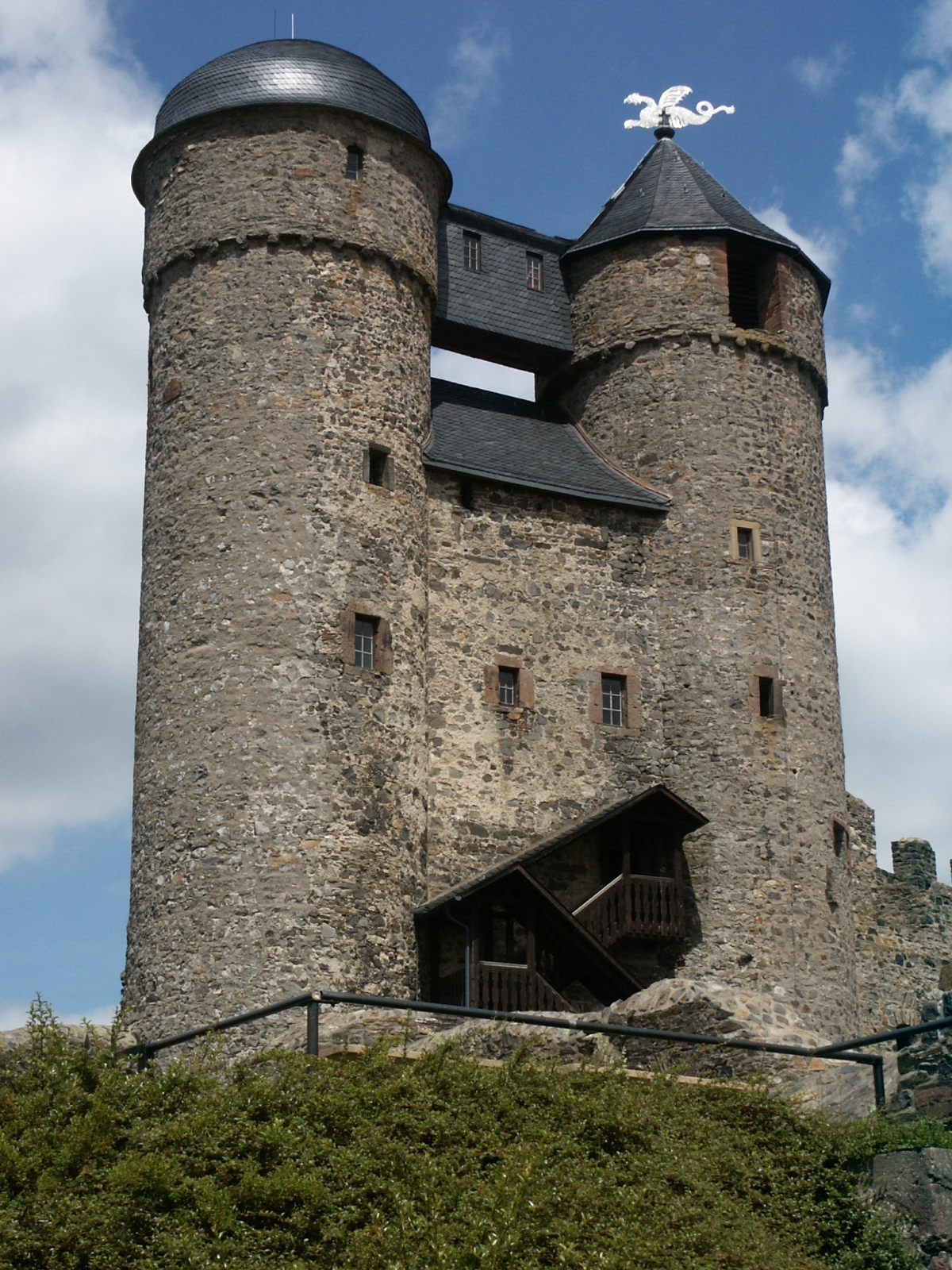
Greifenstein Castle Ruins

==== Königsberg-Hohensolms ====
Königsberg Castle was possibly built by Count Marquard of Solms (1225–1255). However, the structure is possibly older. A separate line of the family formed there, probably due to the distance to the southern possessions around Burgsolms, because Marquard's son, Count Rembold of Solms (1255–1273), called himself Count of Cunigesberg in 1257 (and again in 1266). In contrast to the rest of the family, the House of Solms-Königsberg maintained close relationships with the Landgraves of Hesse, which meant that the relationship with the branches in Braunfels and Burgsolms was strained. Around 1321, Alt-Hohensolms Castle was built as a counterpart in the immediate vicinity of Königsberg. In 1331, Count Philipp of Solms-Königsberg opened his castles of Alt-Hohensolms and Königsberg to the Mainz abbey archbishop Baldwin of Trier. In 1349, Alt-Hohensolms was destroyed by an alliance around the imperial city Wetzlar. As a replacement, Neu-Hohensolms Castle was built two kilometers north in 1350. Contrary to the intra-family agreements, which provided for the preservation of property within the entire house, Count Philipp, the last count from the Solms-Königsberg line, sold his property to Henry II, Landgrave of Hesse. Königsberg Castle became the seat of a Hessian office after Philip's death in 1364.

An illegitimate line of Solms-Königsberg went to Rhenish Hesse during the Reformation period. Illegitimate, or morganatic, descendants of Marquard IV of Solms-Königsberg founded the family "von Solms" belonging to the Niederer Adel at the beginning of the 14th century. They served the Counts of Solms and the House of Nassau as ministeriales or vassals. Between 1551 and 1575, a Peter von Solms from this family, fled with his three sons Bartholomäus, Nikolaus and Peter to the Catholic Rhine-Hesse region Ober-Olm during the Reformation.

In the conflicts with Wetzlar, Neu-Hohensolms was also partially destroyed in 1356 and 1363. With the death of Count Johann IV of Solms–Burgsolms (1405–1415), this line also became extinct. Hohensolms then passed to the Braunfels line and in 1420 to its Lich branch, which used and occupied the castle as a residence, home for second-born princes, and widow's residence until the 20th century.

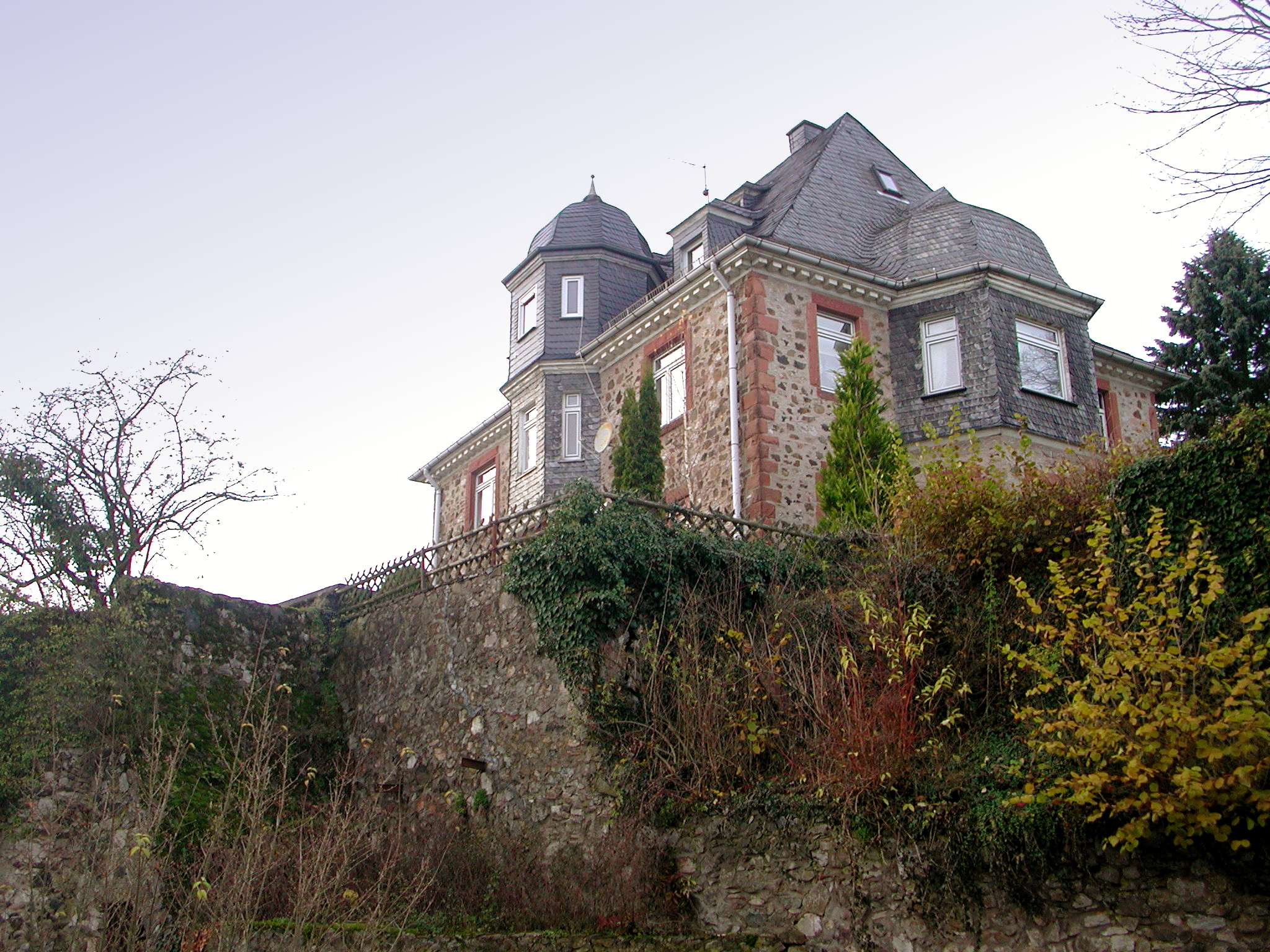
Königsberg Castle

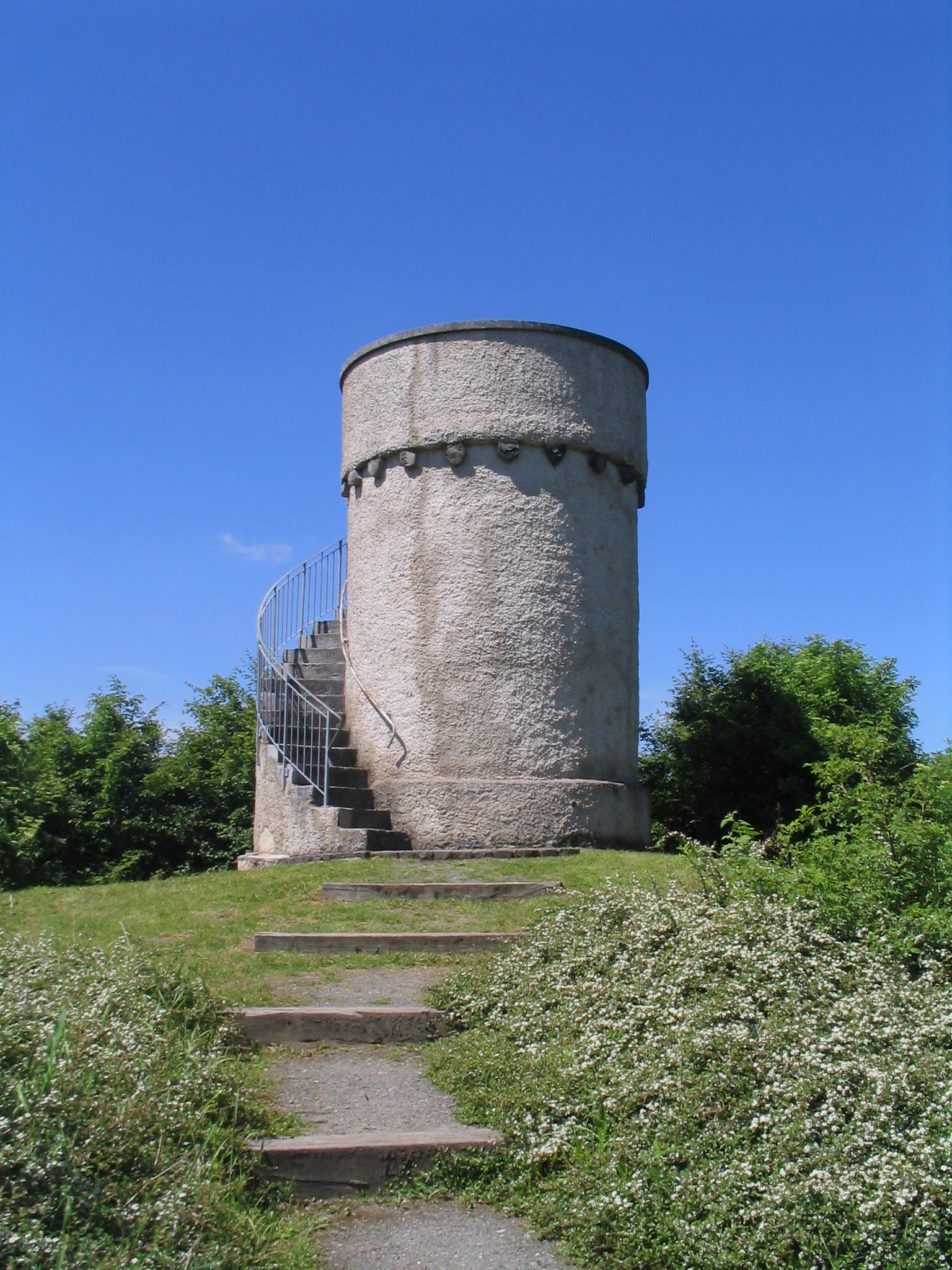
Tower at the location of Alt-Hohensolms Castle

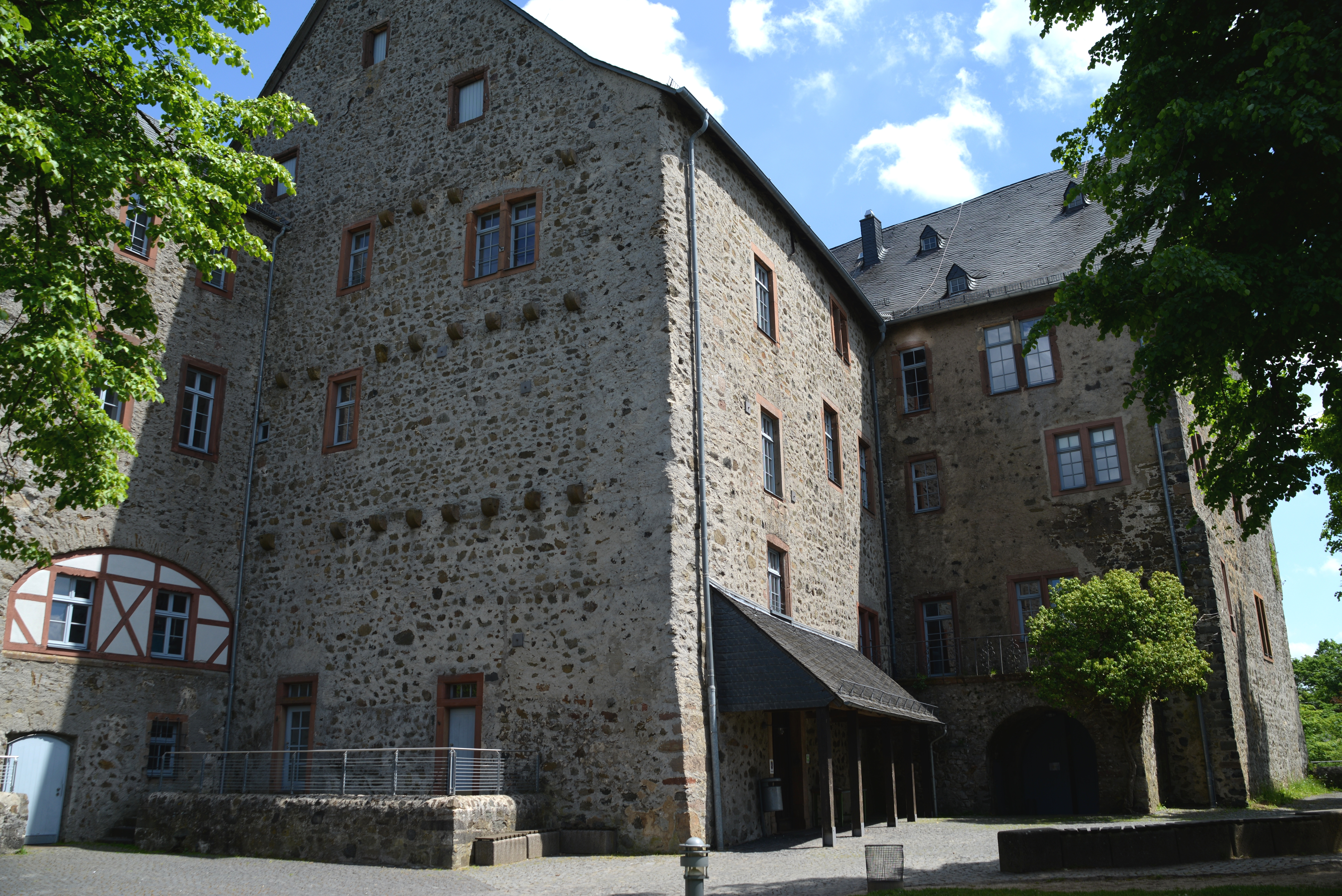
Hohensolms Castle (also called Neu-Hohensolms)

==== Braunfels ====
Braunfels Castle was first mentioned in a document in 1246. Originally a defensive castle against the Counts of Nassau, from 1280 it became the residence of the Counts of Solms. After the aristocratic property was divided between the three lines and the ancestral castle of Solms was destroyed by the Rhenish League of Cities, Braunfels Castle became the new ancestral home of the Counts of Solms-Braunfels in 1384, who were the only one of the three lines to survive and became heir to the entire property in 1415.

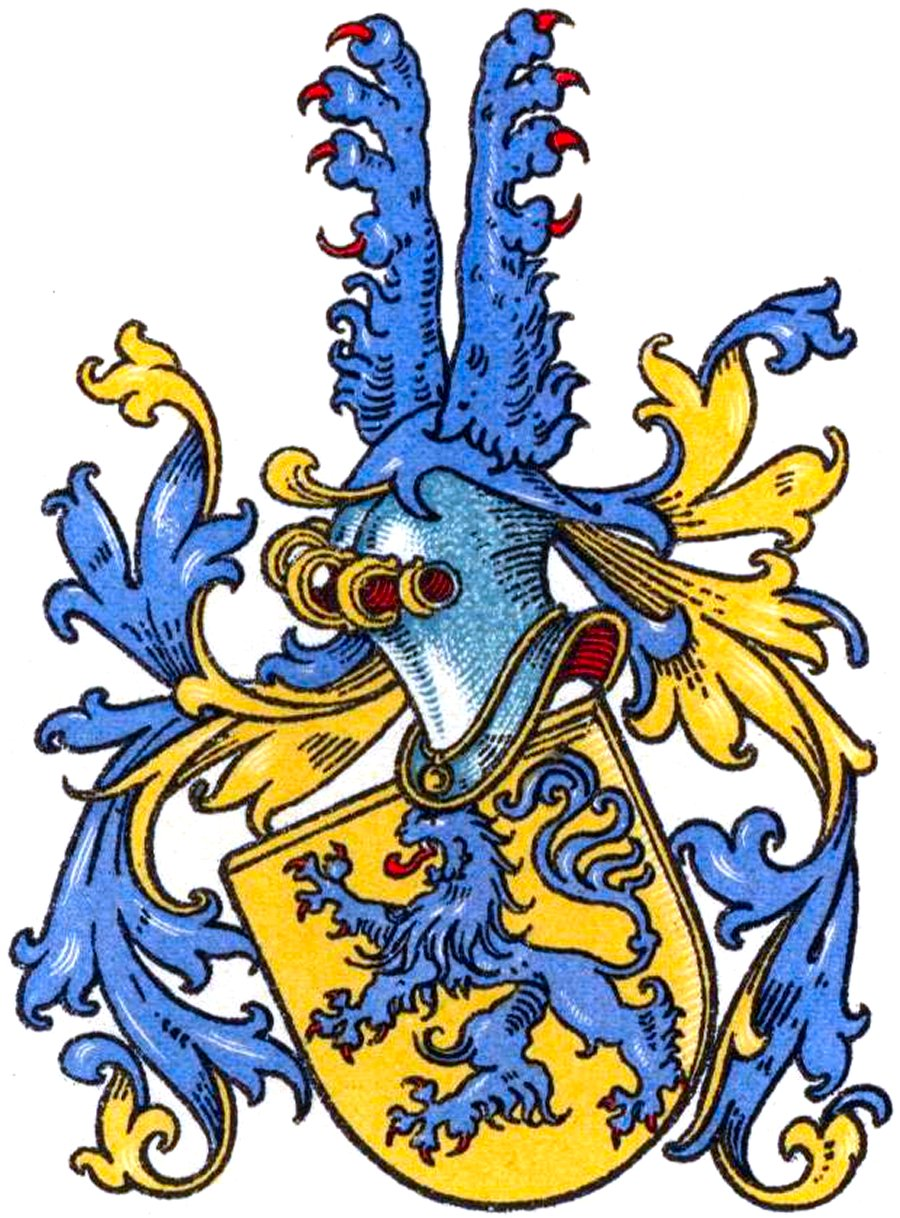
Coat of arms of the Solms-Ottenstein branch

Through the marriage of Heinrich von Solms-Braunfels with Sophia von Ahaus-Ottenstein, daughter of Otto von Ahaus-Ottenstein, a branch of Solms-Ottenstein (in Westphalia) split off in 1324, but in 1408 that branch lost its castle to the Prince-Bishopric of Münster, and in 1424 in the male line became extinct.

When the Counts of Falkenstein died out in 1418, Counts Bernhard and Johann of Solms-Braunfels received a considerable increase in territory in the Wetterau from their inheritance, including the lordships of Münzenberg Castle, Schloss Hungen, Schloss Lich and Schloss Laubach. They joined the Wetterau Association of Imperial Counts, founded in 1422, which received Imperial Estate status and a curial vote in the college of Imperial Princes at the Diet of Worms (1495), and sent a permanent representative to the Imperial Diet from 1512 onwards. The House of Solms thus achieved imperial immediacy. Lich was expanded into a fortress town with roundels before 1540.

Shortly after this inheritance, the county was divided again, this time into the Solms-Braunfels lines (Bernhardine line) and Solms-Lich (Johannine line). From now on these formed the two main lines, which later divided several times.

On 4 April 1571, the Solms Landrecht was introduced, by Counts Philipp von Solms-Braunfels (guardian of the still minor Counts Johann Georg I and Otto von Solms-Laubach), Eberhard and Ernst I zu Solms-Lich, as universally valid law. It subsequently gained importance far beyond the county. Jus commune only applied if the regulations of the Solms Landrecht did not contain any provisions for a particular situation. The Solms Landrecht also retained its validity throughout the 19th century, even after parts of the Solms counties were added to the Grand Duchy of Hesse (Hesse-Darmstadt) in the mediatisation. The Solms Landrecht was replaced on 1 January 1900 by the Bürgerliches Gesetzbuch, which was uniformly applicable throughout the entire German Reich.

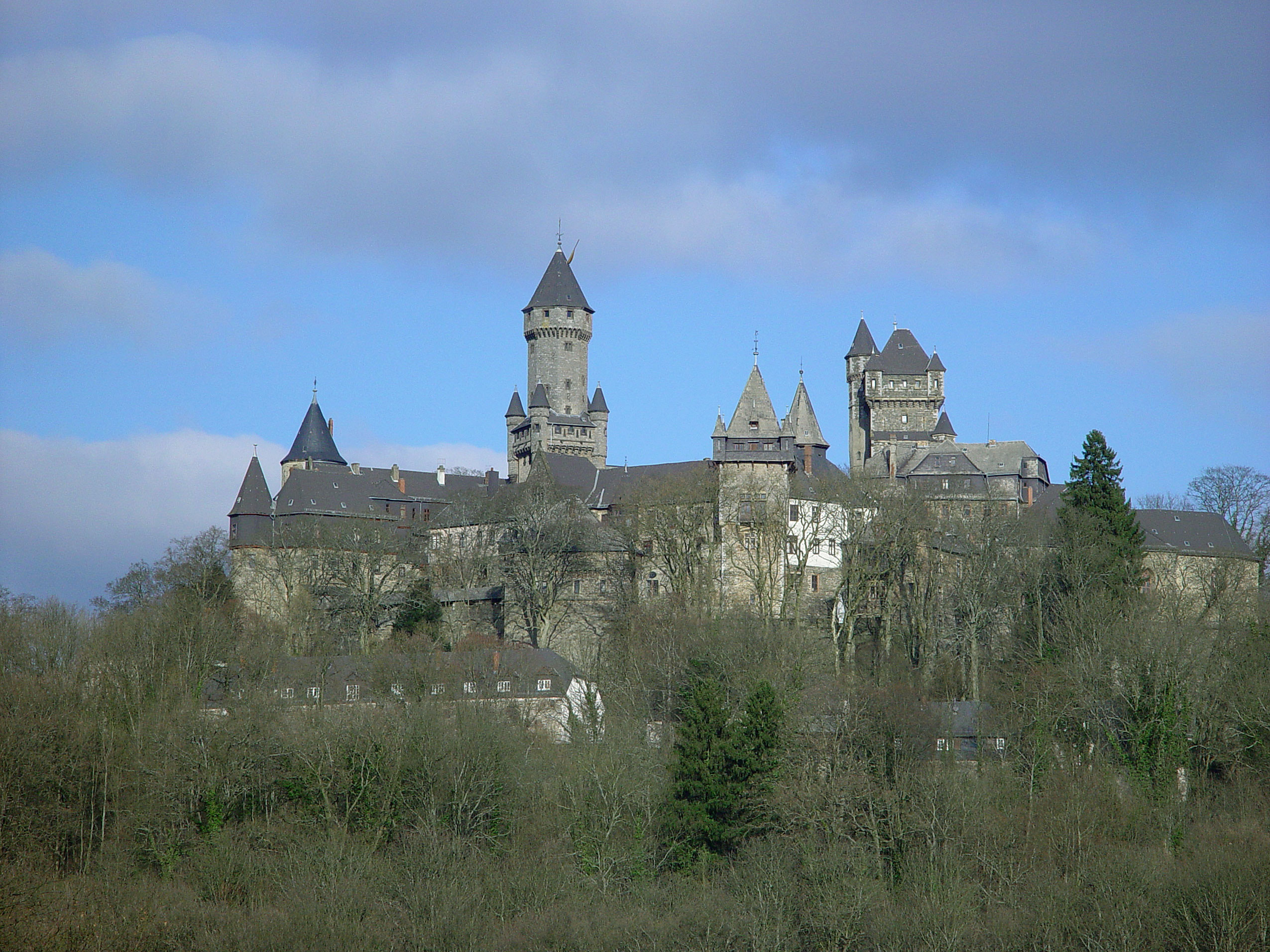
Braunfels Castle

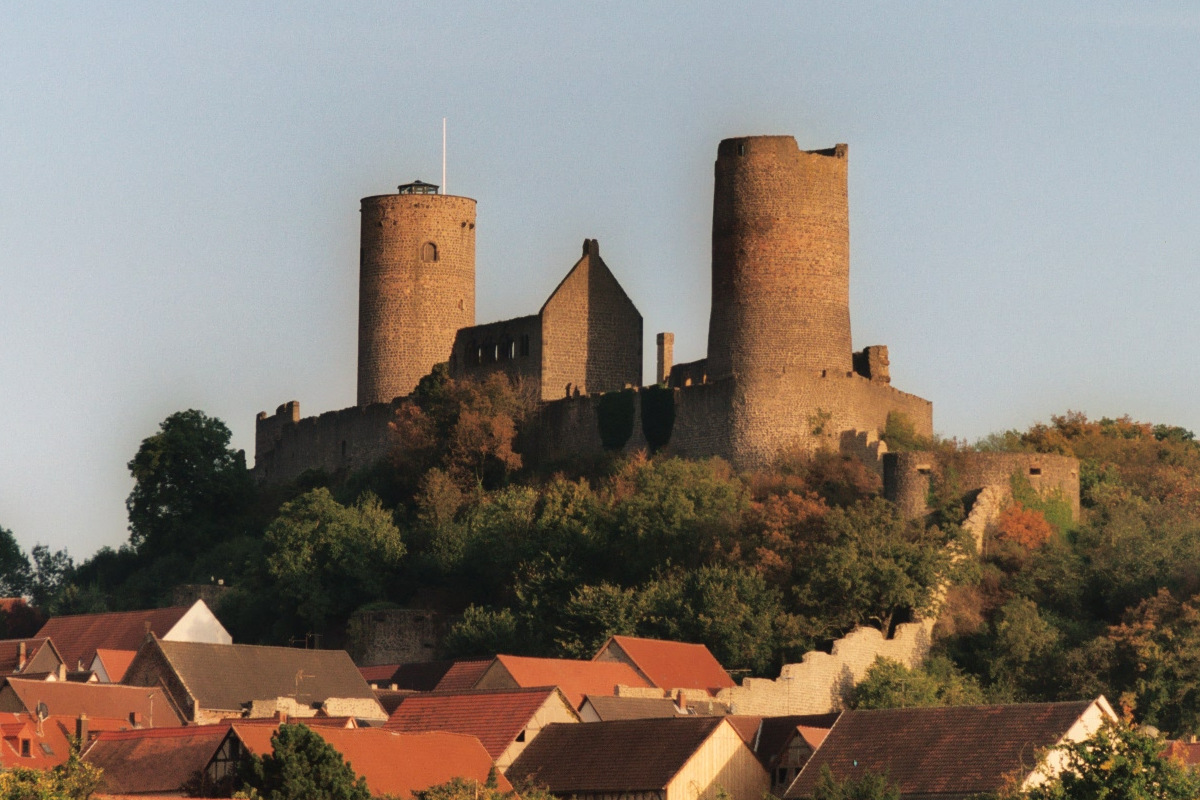
Münzenberg Castle

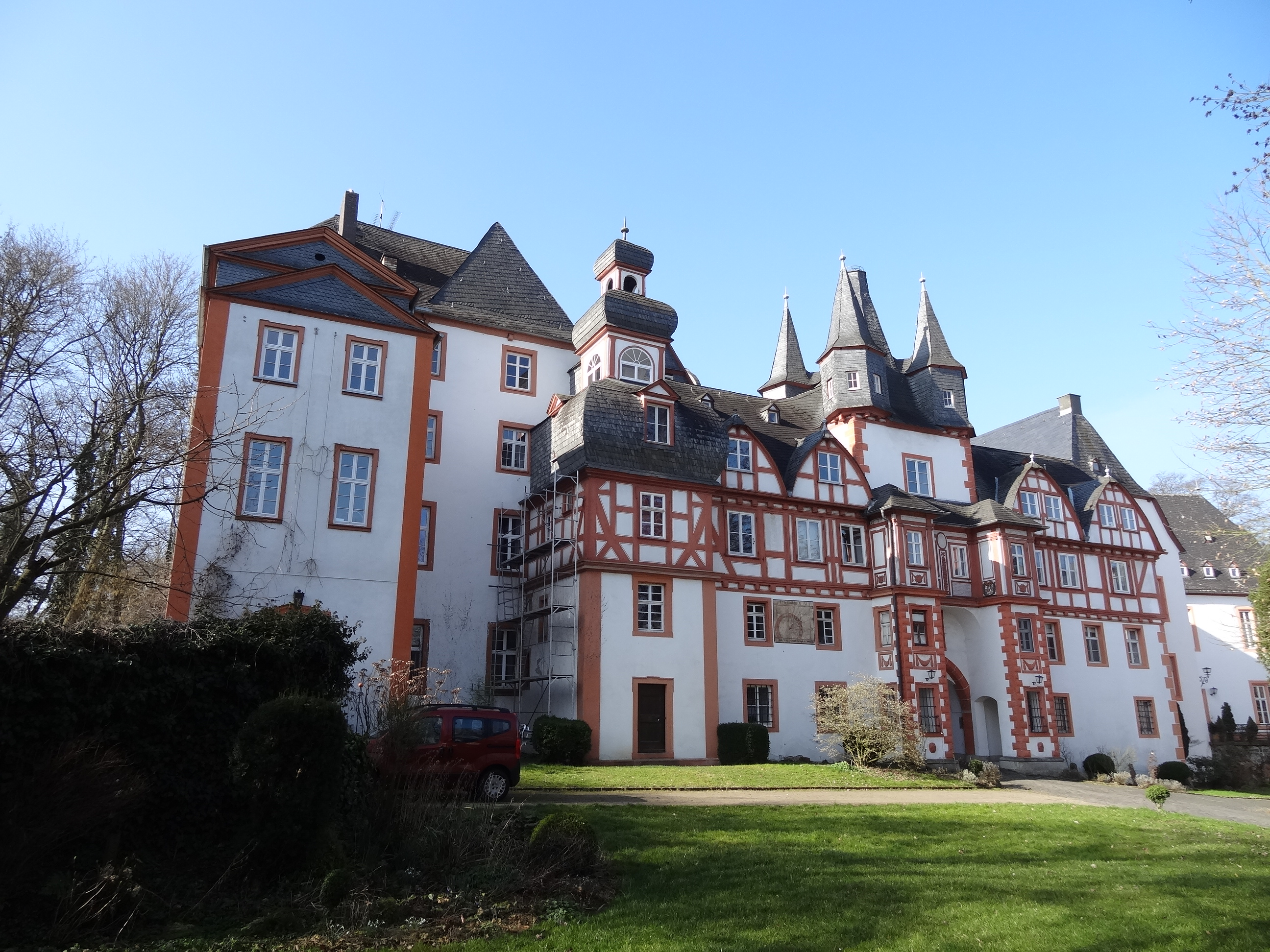
Schloss Hungen

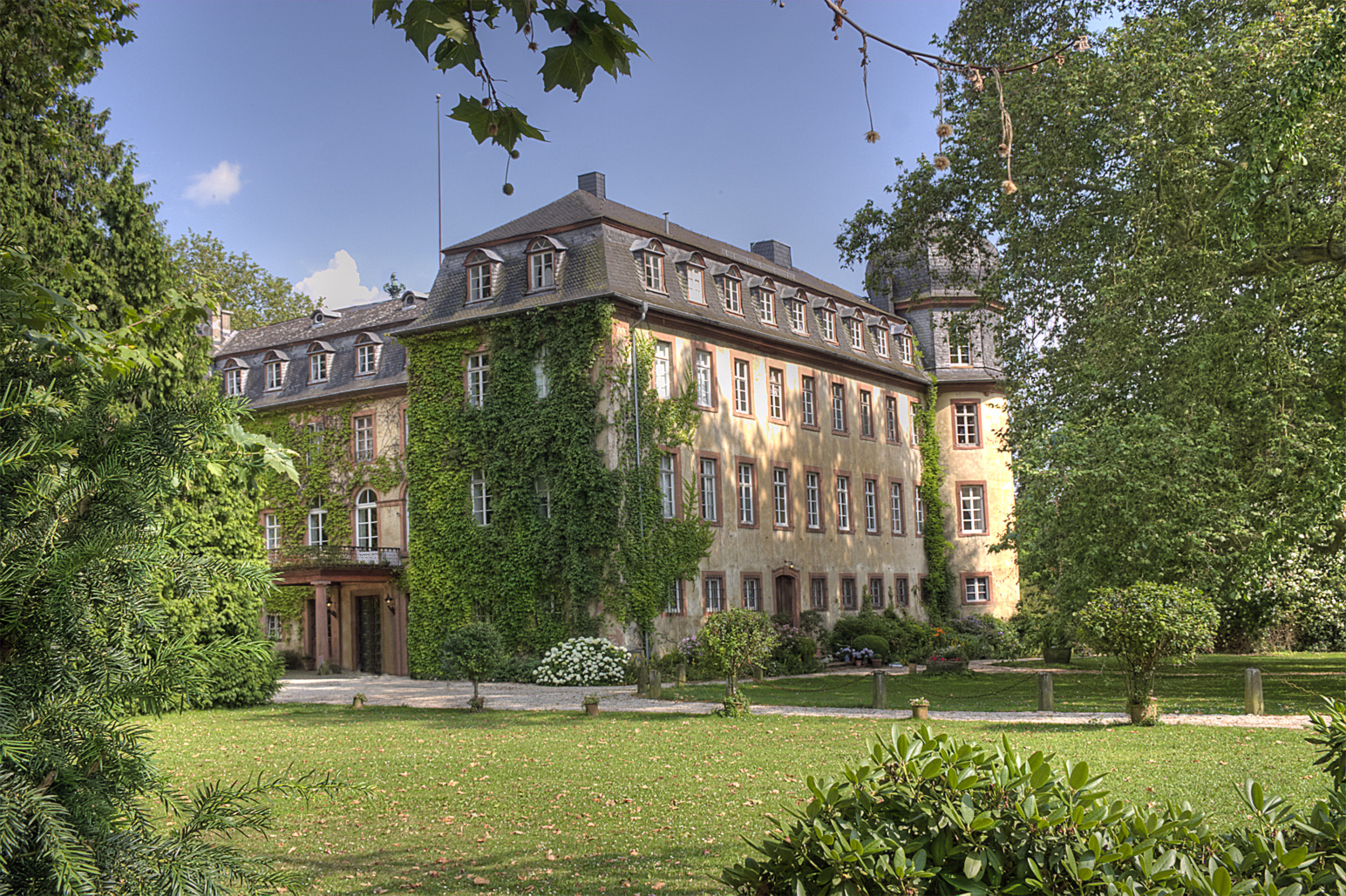
Schloss Lich

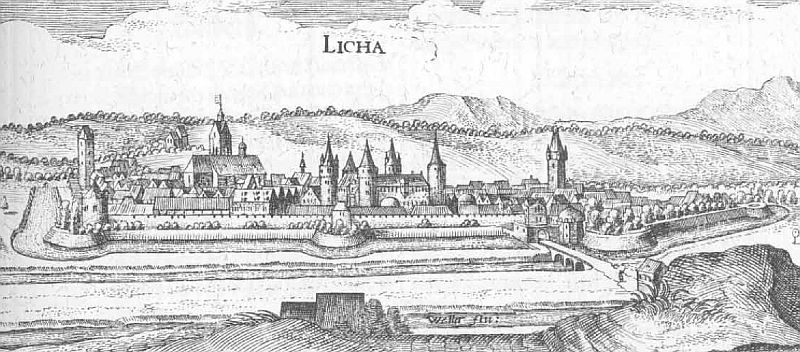
The fortified Lich, by Matthäus Merian, 1655

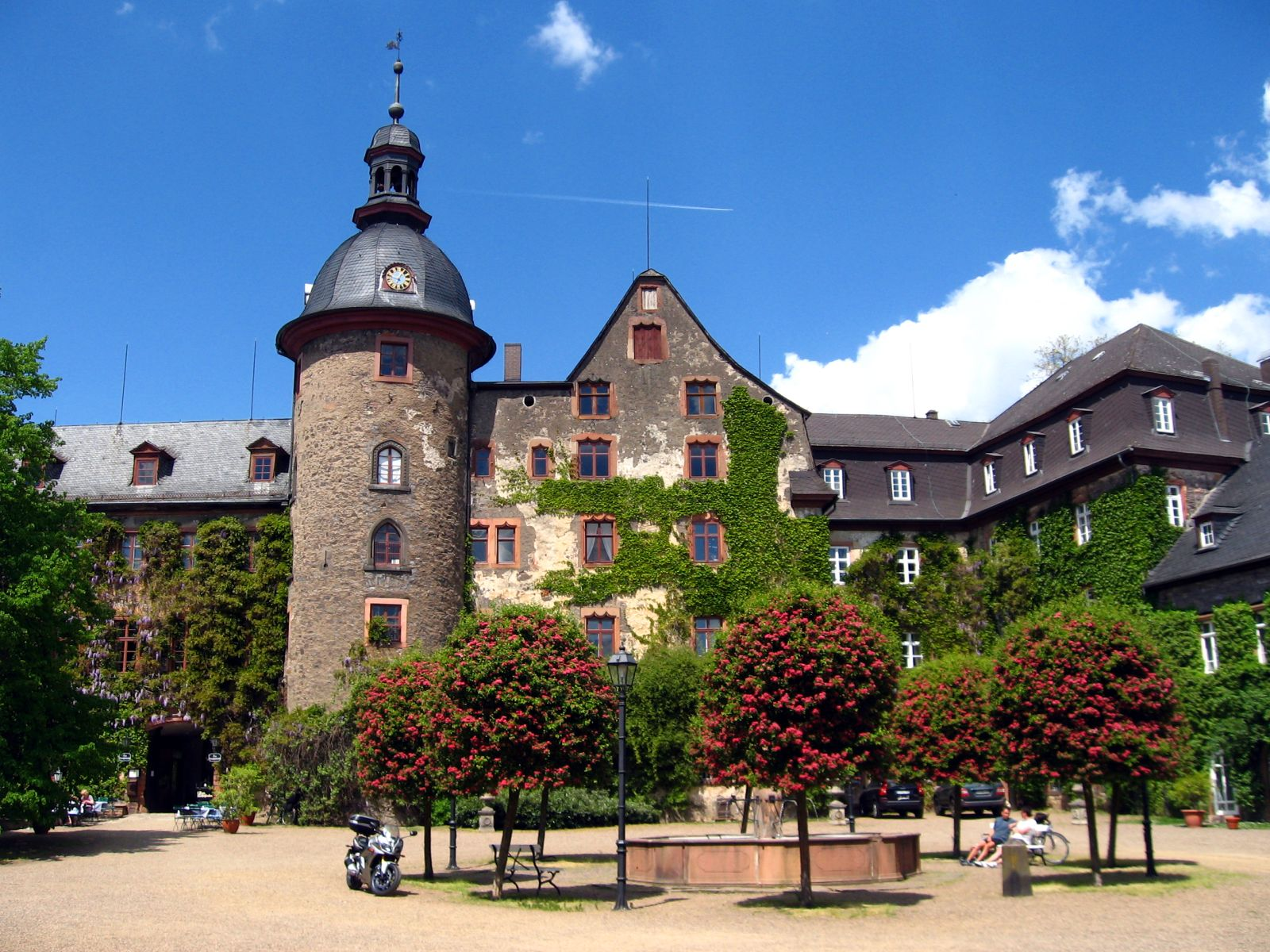
Laubach Castle

=== Younger lines ===
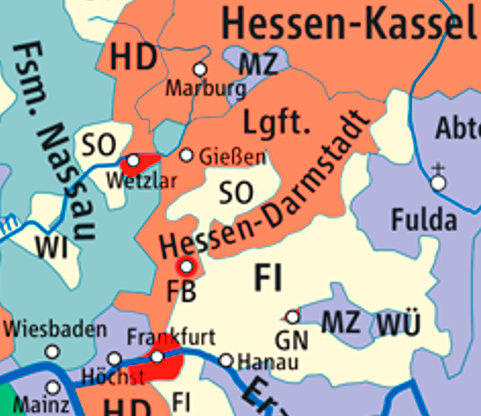
Almost complete domain of the Solms family around 1648 (marked with SO)

Solms-Braunfels further divided into branches in 1607 (several brothers: Counts Johann Albrecht I, Wilhelm I and Reinhard):

- Solms-Braunfels (extinct in 1693 and reunited with Solms-Greifenstein),
- Solms-Greifenstein (from 1693 as Solms-Braunfels; from 1742 imperial princes),
- Solms-Hungen (extinct in 1678 and continued by Solms-Braunfels)

Solms-Lich further divided into the branches in 1548:

- Solms-Lich (1548–1718)
- Solms-Hohensolms (1548, from 1718 as Solms-Hohensolms-Lich; from 1792 imperial princes),
- Solms-Laubach (from 1548)
  - Solms-Sonnewalde (1561–1615, Brandenburg)
  - Solms-Rödelheim (1607 or 1627–1674)
  - Solms-Laubach (1607 or 1627–1676)
  - Solms-Sonnewalde (from 1607 or 1627)
    - Solms-Sonnewalde (from 1688/1711/1728, Saxony)
    - Solms-Sonnewalde-Pouch (from 1688/1711/1728)
    - Solms-Sonnewalde-Rösa (from 1688/1711/1728)
  - Solms-Baruth (since 1607 or 1627, Brandenburg)
    - Solms-Rödelheim
    - Solms-Laubach
    - Solms-Wildenfels (Saxony)
    - Solms-Utphe (extinct in 1762)
    - Solms-Baruth I
    - Solms-Baruth II (raised to princely rank in 1888)

==== Braunfels Line ====
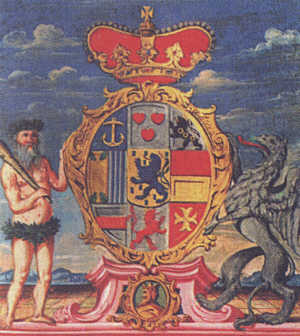
Coat of arms of the princes of Solms-Braunfels

The full title of the head of the main line Solms-Braunfels, elevated to the rank of Imperial Prince in 1742, was "Prince of Solms-Braunfels, Count of Greifenstein, Lichtenstein and Hungen, Tecklenburg, Crichingen, Lingen, Lord of Münzenberg, Rheda, Wildenfels, Sonnewalde, Püttlingen, Dorstweiler and Bacourt". (Note: German: Fürst zu Solms-Braunfels, Graf zu Greifenstein, Lichtenstein und Hungen, Tecklenburg, Crichingen, Lingen, Herr zu Münzenberg, Rheda, Wildenfels, Sonnewalde, Püttlingen, Dorstweiler und Bacourt)

As a result of a ruling by the Reichskammergericht, the Westphalian County of Tecklenburg fell to the House of Solms-Braunfels in 1696. Count Wilhelm Moritz von Solms-Braunfels sold Tecklenburg to Prussia in 1707.

Shares in the Butzbach estate had already been acquired by Solms-Braunfels in the 15th century, and Solms-Lich acquired further shares in 1479; The shares were held until they were sold to Hesse-Darmstadt in 1741; the administrative headquarters was the Solmser Schloss in Butzbach.

The Solms-Braunfels line divided into an older branch, based at Braunfels Castle, Altenburg Abbey and also at Schloss Hungen (until 1974). With the death of the last male descendant of this branch, Georg Friedrich Fürst zu Solms-Braunfels (1890–1970), the Braunfels property passed to his son-in-law Hans Georg Graf von Oppersdorff-Solms-Braunfels (1920–2003). Subsequently, the property passed to the son of Graf von Oppersdorff-Solms-Braunfels, Johannes, who adopted the name Grafen von Oppersdorff-Solms-Braunfels.

The founder of the younger, Catholic branch was Prince Wilhelm Heinrich in Austria-Hungary. Two thirds of his large land holdings in Bohemia, Moravia, Silesia, Galicia and Lodomeria were lost after 1918 and the remaining were lost in 1945. The younger Solms-Braunfels branch became extinct in the male line in 1989.

==== Licher line ====
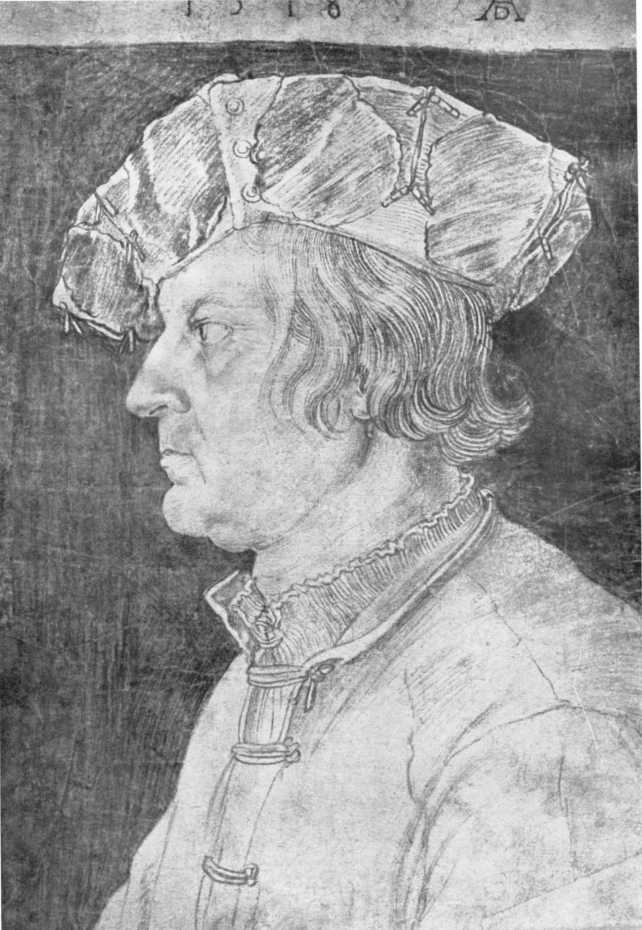
Philip, Count of Solms-Lich (1468–1544), copperplate engraving by Albrecht Dürer

In 1461, Count Kuno von Solms-Lich inherited from his grandfather, Frank von Kronberg, shares in another part of the Falkenstein inheritance: the ''Amt Assenheim'' together with the Rödelheim Castle. Kuno's son, Philip, Count of Solms-Lich (1468–1544) was imperial councillor and Geheimrat to Frederick III, Elector of Saxony, and so the House of Solms gained considerable influence in the age of Reformation. Martin Luther is said to have stayed overnight in Lich on the way to the Diet of Worms, and the painters Lucas Cranach the Elder and Albrecht Dürer portrayed him there. Later, he served the Hessian Landgrave Philip I. In 1537, he acquired the Lordship of Sonnewalde in Lower Lusatia, and in 1544 the manor of Pouch. On his deathbed, he professed his Protestant faith.

The property of the House of Solms-Lich was then divided, with Reinhard Graf zu Solms (1491–1562) taking over the offices of Lich and Hohensolms, which later fell to two separate branches and only reunited in 1718. The descendants of his younger brother Otto (1496–1522) received the Laubach office as well as the Sonnewalde and Pouch properties, which created the Solms-Laubach line that still exists today.

With the death of Count Hermann Adolf Moritz von Solms-Lich (1646–1718), his inheritance passed to his cousin Friedrich Wilhelm von Solms-Hohensolms (1682–1744), who from 1718 united the Solms-Hohensolms and Solms-Lich branches to form the branch Solms-Hohensolms-Lich that still exists today. Francis II, Holy Roman Emperor elevated Count Carl Christian zu Solms-Hohensolms-Lich to the status of Imperial Prince in 1792. This branch still owns Schloss Lich today and also owned Hohensolms Castle until 1968.

The branch of the Counts of Solms-Laubach split into the Laubach and Rödelheim branches in 1607, when Count Johann Georg divided the county between his two eldest sons. Firstly, Frederick (1574–1649) received Rödelheim, a 5/12 share in Assenheim and Petterweil as the County of Solms-Rödelheim. The residence of the Counts of Solms-Rödelheim and Assenheim was initially in Rödelheim Castle (destroyed in 1944); today this branch lives in Schloss Assenheim. Secondly, Albert Otto (1576–1610) received Laubach, Utphe and Münzenberg, and founded the County of Solms-Laubach. The county lasted until 1676, when it fell to Johann Friedrich zu Solms-Wildenfels, whose descendants form the younger Laubach branch, which owns Schloss Laubach and Arnsburg Abbey to this day (and also owned Utphe estate until 1928 and Münzenberg Castle until 1935).

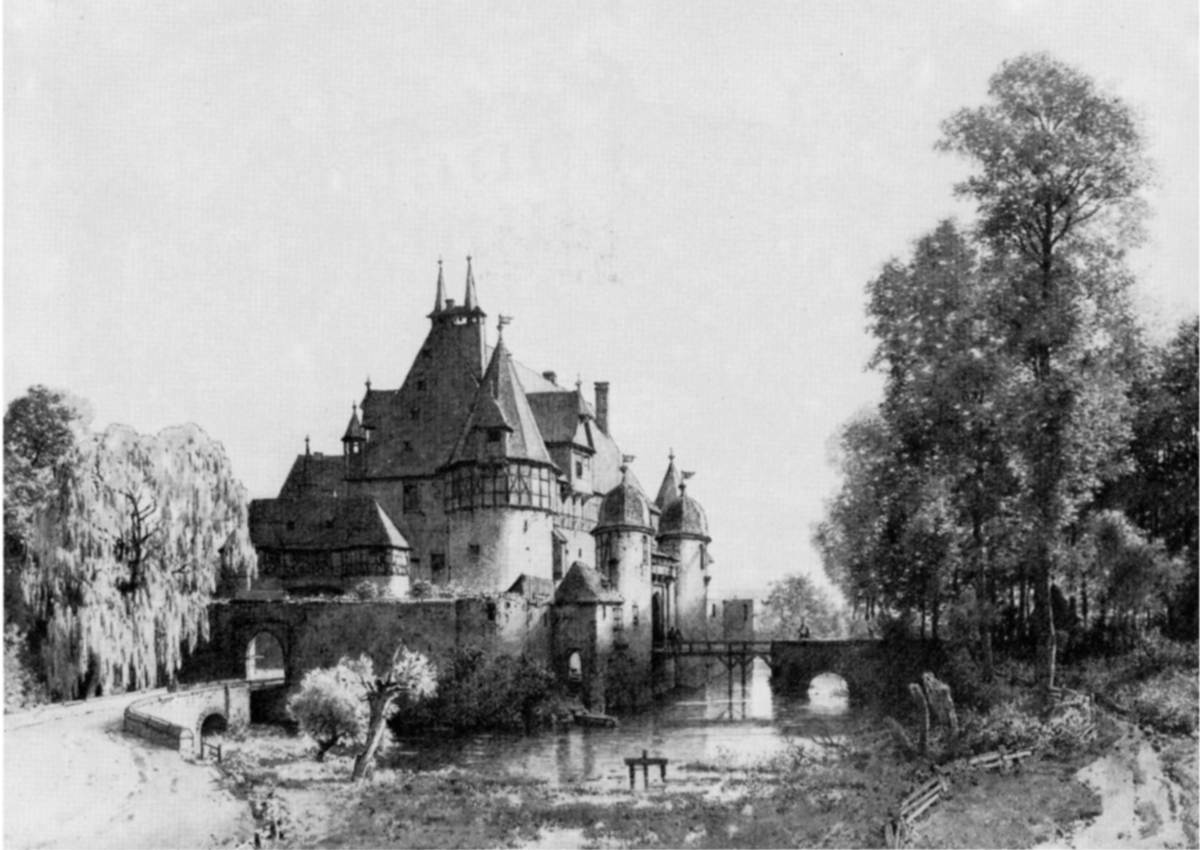
Rödelheim Castle

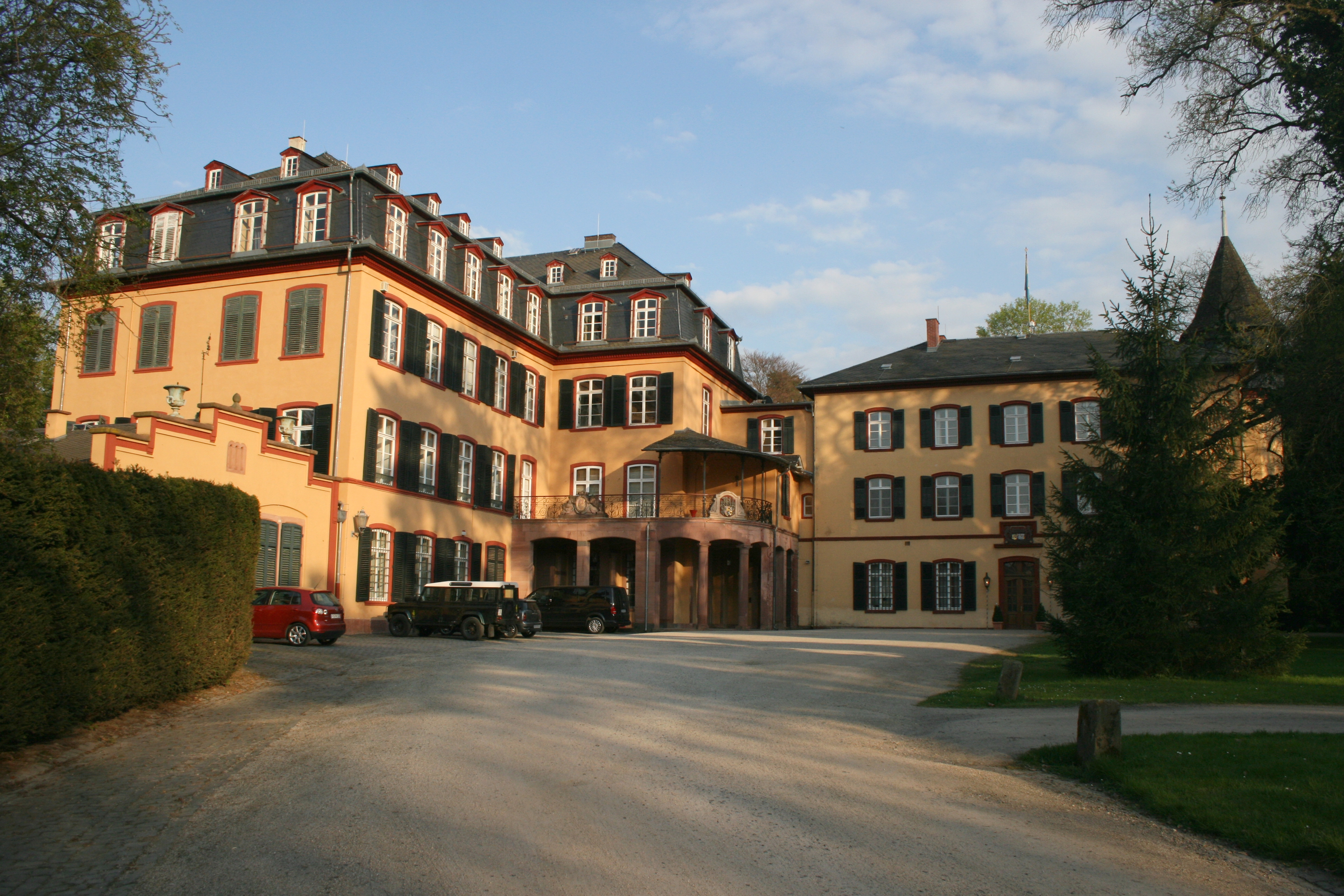
Schloss Assenheim

In 1537, Philip, Count of Solms-Lich bought the then-Saxon estate of Sonnewalde and in 1544 the manor Pouch. The descendants of his younger son Otto (1496–1522) inherited these, along with Laubach. Count Otto zu Solms-Laubach (1550–1612) was the first to reside in Sonnewalde, laying the foundation stone for the castle in 1582. Ownership of the Sonnewalde estate granted the House of Solms an individual vote (German: Virilstimme) in the provincial assemblies of Brandenburg and Lower Lusatia, as well as a hereditary seat in the Prussian House of Lords. The Counts of Solms-Sonnewalde remained based in Sonnewalde until they were expropriated by the land reforms after World War II in East Germany. The estates of Pouch, Hillmersdorf and Proßmarke also belonged to this territory. Since 1828, the Wurschen manor in Upper Lusatia has been owned by the Solms-Sonnewalde line, which reacquired it by purchasing it in 1997. Through marriage in 1914, one of the largest estates in the Netherlands, Kasteel Weldam, came to a branch of the Counts of Solms-Sonnewalde, who still reside there today.

In 1596, Otto zu Solms-Laubach also bought the Baruth estate including the properties of Mahlsdorf and Zesch, which belonged to the Margraviate of Lower Lusatia. From 1615 to 1945, a separate branch, the "Counts of Solms-Baruth", resided at Schloss Baruth, built after 1671, and later expanded their holdings to include Golßen Castle and Kasel Castle in Kasel-Golzig. The Baruth estate granted its owners a seat on the bench of counts, prelates and lords in the large state parliaments of Dresden, until it was absorbed by Prussia in 1815, which resulted in a hereditary seat in the Prussian House of Lords. In 1767, Count Hans Christian zu Solms-Baruth acquired the Lower Silesian Kliczków Castle, which subsequently became part of his main residence.

In 1602, Otto zu Solms-Laubach also inherited the Lordship of Wildenfels (southeast of Zwickau) through an inheritance agreement with the lords of Wildenfels. The lordship came under the rule of the Electorate of Saxony in 1706, but retained special rights as a mediatised lordship. The Counts of Solms-Wildenfels owned Schloss Wildenfels until 1945.

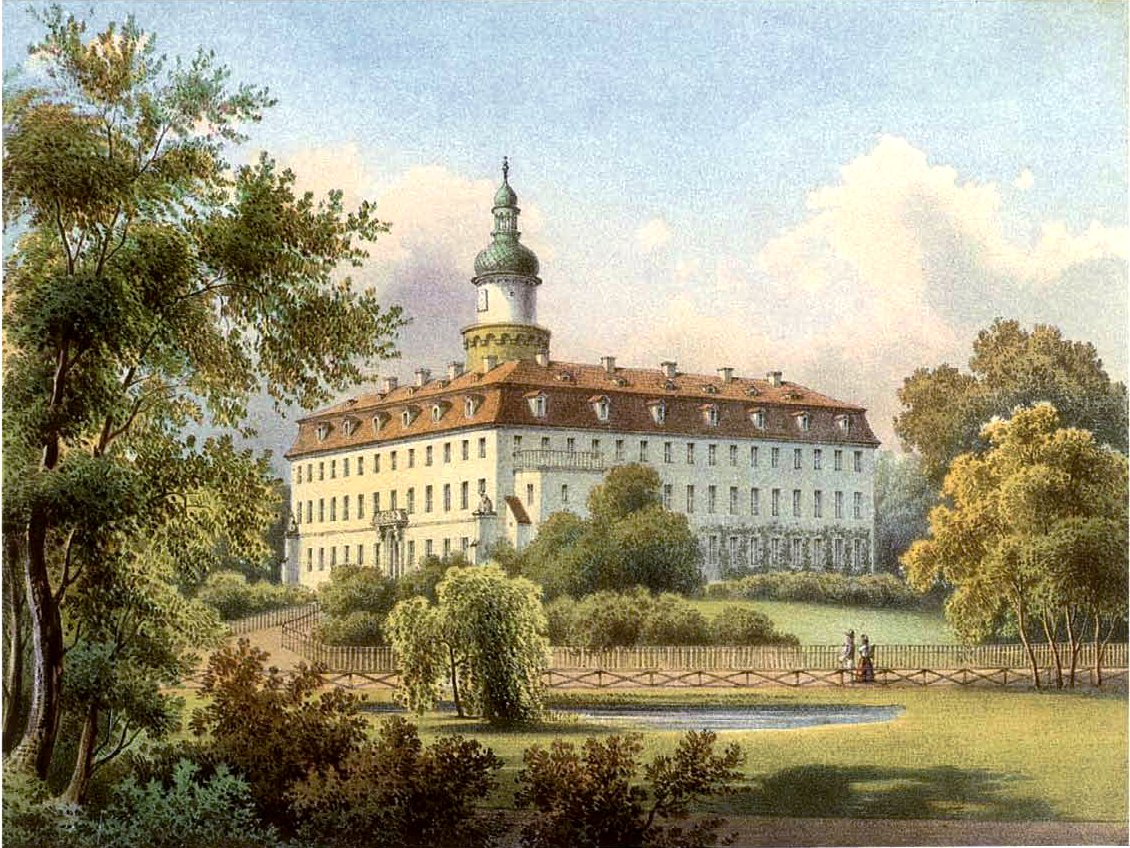
Schloss Sonnewalde, Lower Lusatia

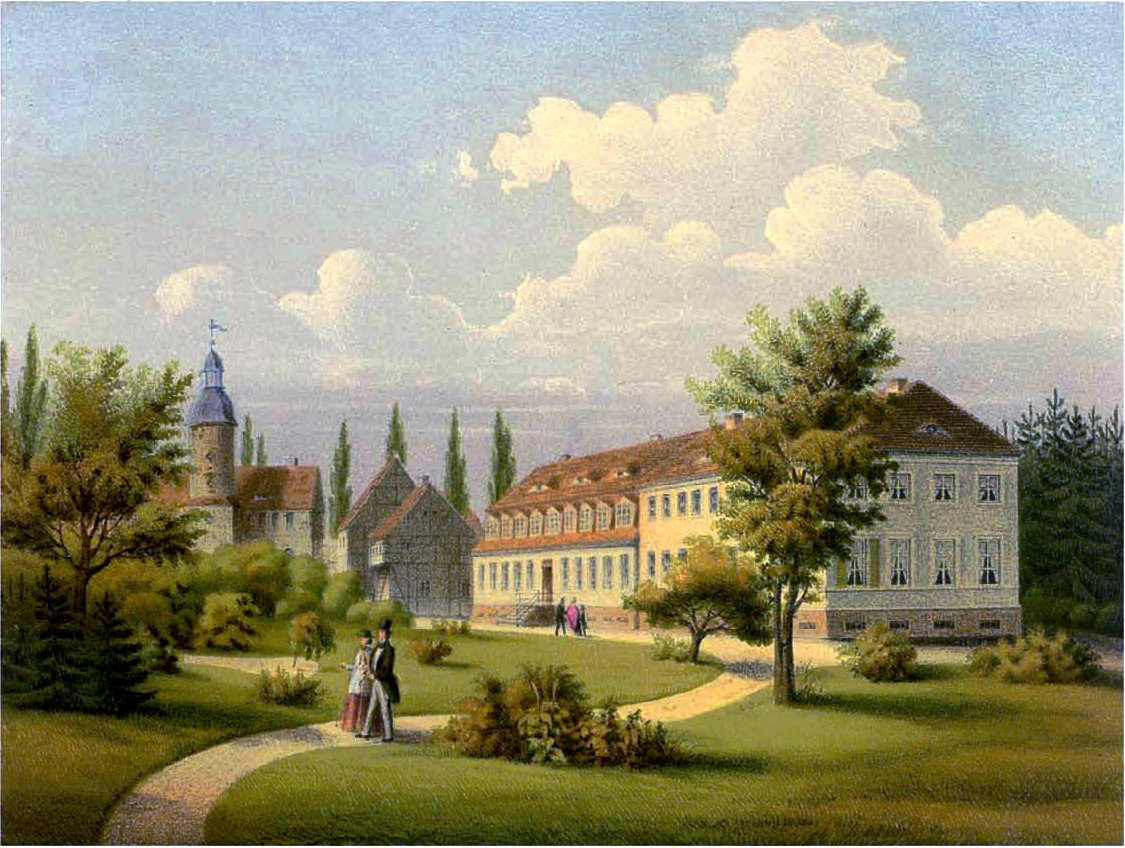
Schloss Baruth, Lower Lusatia

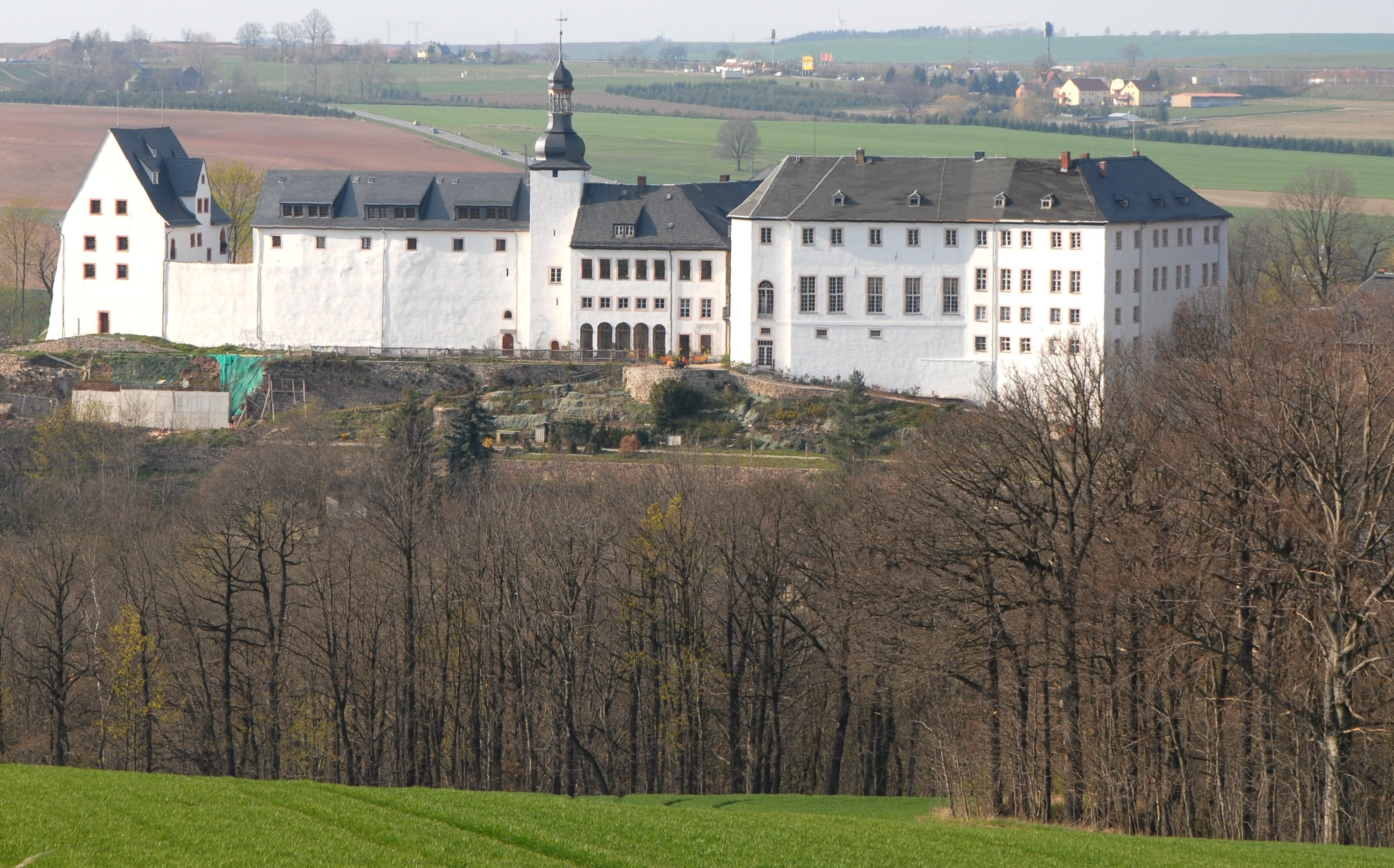
Schloss Wildenfels, Saxony

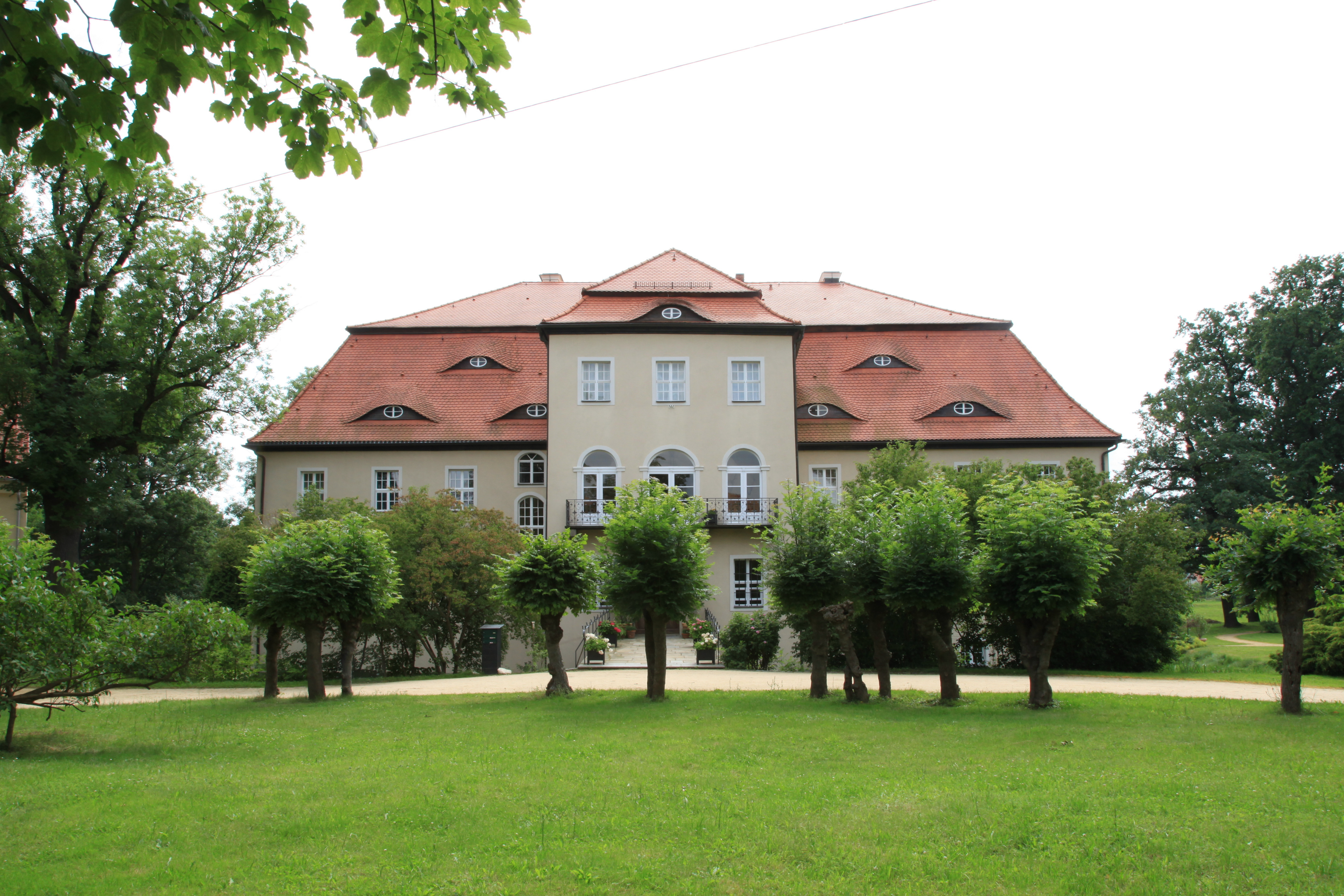
Schloss Wurschen, Upper Lusatia

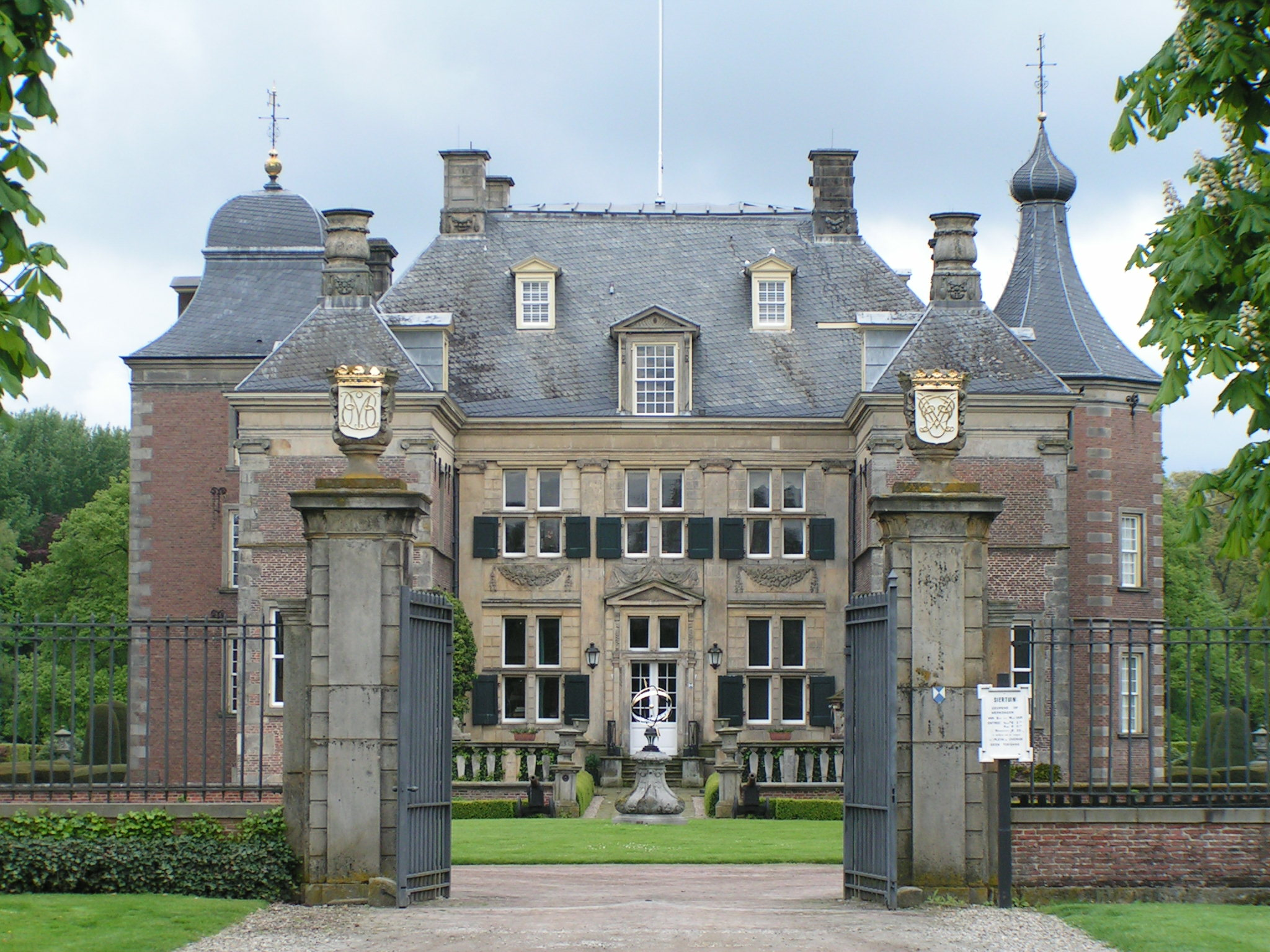
Kasteel Weldam, Netherlands

=== Mediatisation ===
In the Reichsdeputationshauptschluss of 1803, the House of Solms was awarded the abbeys of Altenberg (in Braunfels) and Arnsburg (in Laubach) as compensation for lost territories on the left bank of the Rhine; both remain in the family's possession to this day. However, in 1806, the political independence of the Solms counties and principalities ended. Through mediatisation, the principalities of Solms-Braunfels and Solms-Hohensolms-Lich were divided between Hesse-Darmstadt, Prussia, Württemberg and Austria, while the counties of Solms-Laubach and Solms-Rödelheim-Assenheim fell to the Grand Duchy of Hesse. As members of a mediatised house, the mediatised princes and counts retained a number of privileges until 1918, including, according to the Constitution of the German Confederation, equal rank with the continuing ruling dynasties. Furthermore, in the princely branches they could claim the style "Serene Highness" (Note: German: Durchlaucht) and in the count's the style "Illustrious Highness". (Note: German: Erlaucht)

The lordship of Wildenfels had already lost its imperial immediacy to the Electorate of Saxony in 1706. Its remaining special rights expressly abolished by Article 51 of the Constitution of the Free State of Saxony of 1 November 1920. The lordships of Sonnewalde and Baruth, on the other hand, had never been imperial estates, but retained special rights as state countries (Note: German: Freie Standesherrschaft) after Saxony's annexation by Prussia in 1815.

== Coat of arms ==
Billet covered coat of arms

The oldest coats of arms of the Counts of Solms depicts a damascened shield on a larger shield. A lion appeared on the coat of arms for the first time in 1232. The original coat of arms shows a blue lion on a gold shield.

To differentiate the branches, Solms-Königsberg adopted a shield covered with seven (3:2:2) blue billets as its coat of arms, while Solms-Braunfels and Solms-Burgsolms differed in their crests. Solms-Braunfels adopted a blue lion in gold vol as its crest (after the Falkenstein inheritance the vol were divided in red and gold), while the seals of the Solms-Burgsolms line show both two lions, one with a trout in its mouth.

After the Falkenstein-Münzenberg inheritance, the shield was quartered. Fields 1 and 4 feature a blue lion on a gold field. Fields 2 and 3 were divided in red and gold (coat of arms of the Hagen-Münzenberg family, which became extinct in 1255).

Following the fashion of the time, the coat of arms of the Counts of Solms was augmented to include the respective new properties and claims. After the purchase of Sonnewalde and Wildenfels by Solms-Lich and Solms-Laubach respectively, these were the silver lion on a black field (Sonnewalde) and the black rose on a gold field (Wildenfels). Both coats of arms are still part of the coats of arms of the Princes of Solms-Hohensolms-Lich and the Counts of Laubach and their cadet branches.

The coat of arms of the counts and princes of Solms-Braunfels was expanded to include Lingen (golden anchor on a blue field), Tecklenburg (three red water lily petals on a silver field) and Rheda (black, gold-crowned lion on a silver shield, covered with three gold rings) as well as Kriechingen (silver shield covered with a red crossbar), Püttlingen and Dorstweiler (red lion on a silver shield) and Beaucourt (golden cross on a red field). Different versions also include Greifenstein (golden shield with four green oak leaves in the corners), Lichtenstein (three blue bars on a silver shield) and, more rarely, Limpurg-Gaildorf (divided red and silver with four points and five (3:2) silver maces on a blue field).

While, Solms-Hohensolms-Lich and Solms-Laubach bear the heraldic elements of Solms-Münzenberg-Sonnewalde-Wildenfels, Solms-Braunfels reverted to its original coat of arms, the blue lion on a gold field. This time, however, the shield is strewn with blue shingles.

Since the 17th century, each coat of arms has been adorned with a crown, either a princely crown, a princely hat, an illustrious crown or a count's coronet, depending on the ranks of the different branches and the fashion of the time.

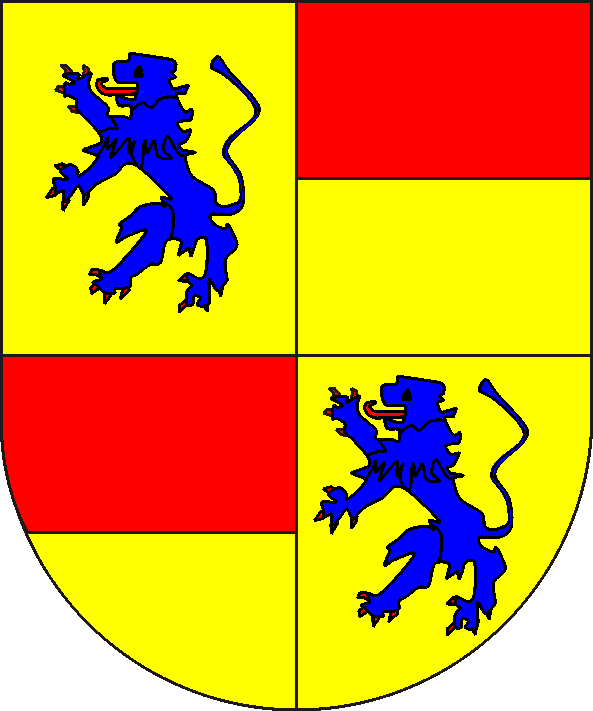
Solms-Münzenberg (1407)

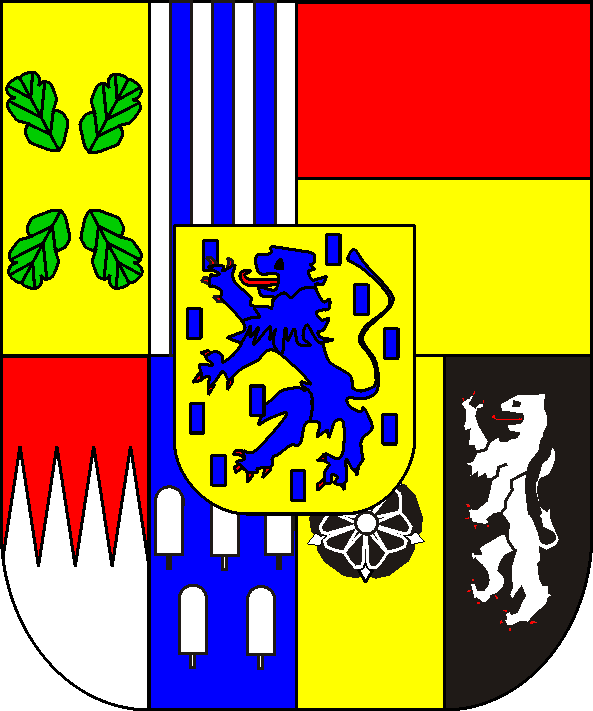
Solms-Braunfels

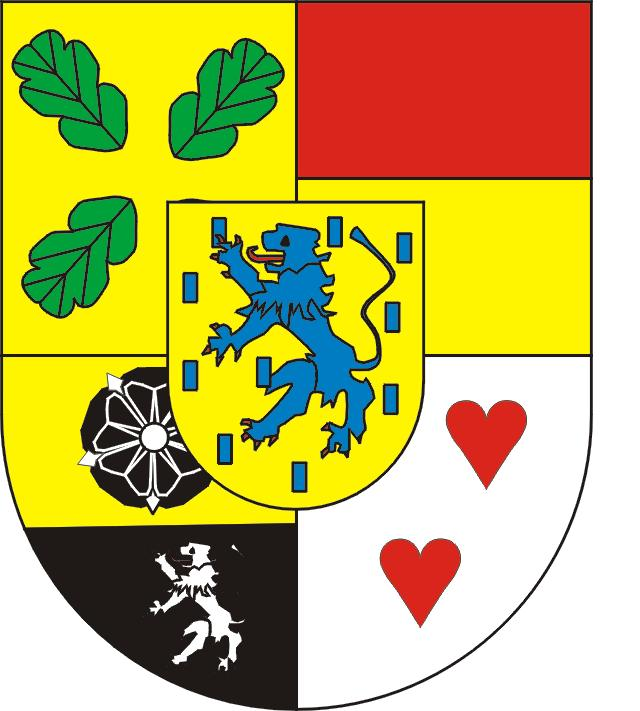
Solms-Lich

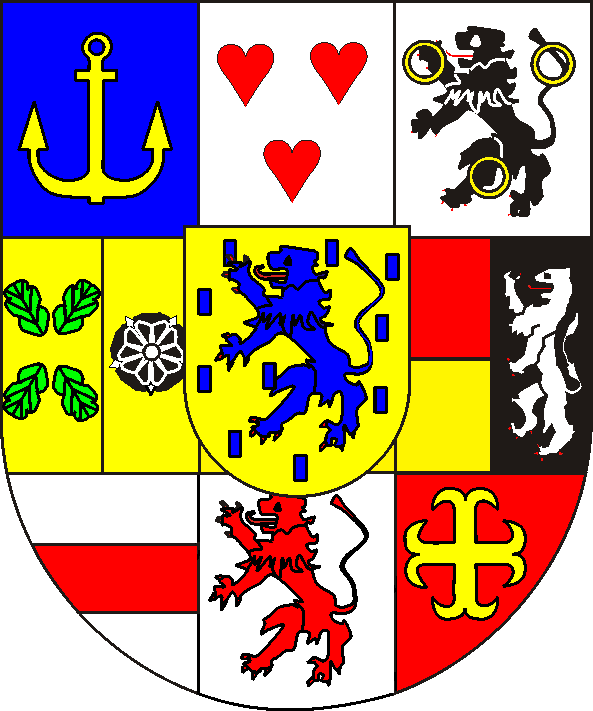
Solms-Hohensolms-Lich

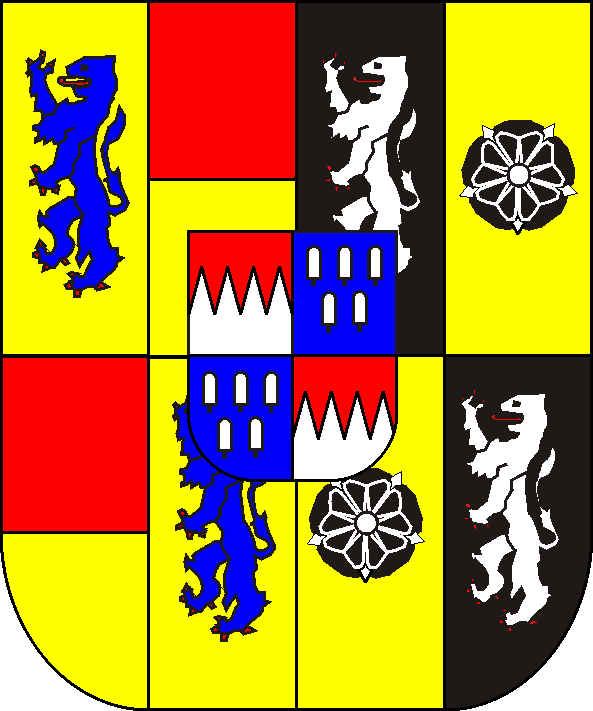
Solms-Rödelheim-Assenheim

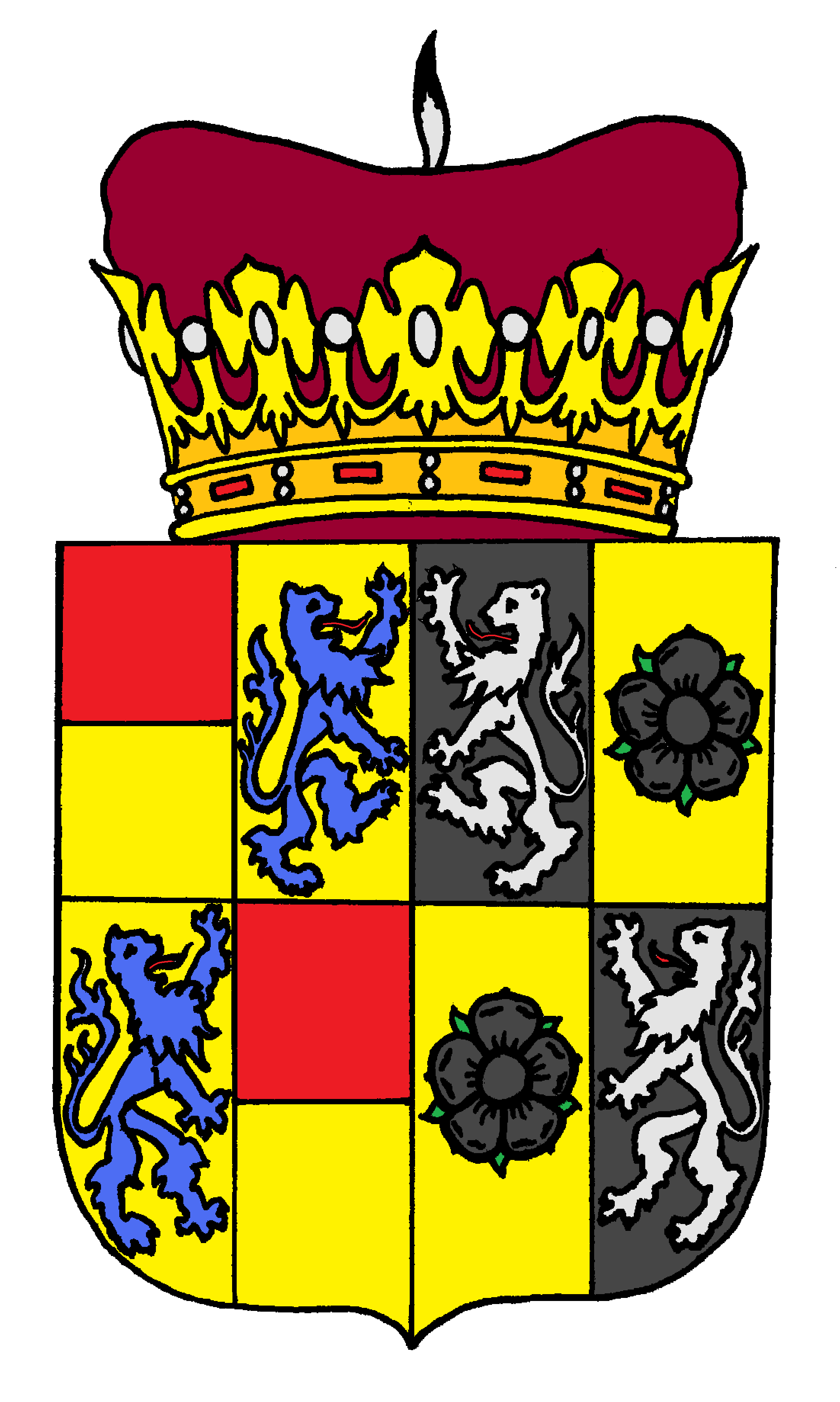
Solms-Wildenfels and Solms-Baruth

== Castles and palaces ==
- Alternberg Abbey: burial place of the House of Solms, owned by the Princes of Solms-Braunfels from 1802
- Arnsburg Abbey: Former Cistercian monastery (1174 to 1803), then owned by the Counts of Solms-Laubach to this day; Baroque parts used as a castle.
- Assenheim Castle: From 1924 to 1932 it was the seat of the Forscherheims Assenheim, one of the first German scholarly colleges, founded by Max Graf zu Solms and maintained as a patron.
- Schloss Baruth, Lower Lusatia
- Braunfels Castle: Solms family's ancestral castle. Numerous renovations over 700 years, most recently rebuilt in neo-Romanesque style with numerous towers (1880). Gothic castle church (14th century)
- Burgsolms: former seat
- Butzbach: Solms Castle
- Golßen Castle, Lower Lusatia (adjacent to Baruth)
- Greifenstein Castle: One of the most important fortresses of the Renaissance, now in ruins. German Bell Museum.
- Alt-Hohensolms Castle: Abandoned hilltop castle, observation tower in place of the former core castle. Ring walls preserved.
- Hohensolms Castle: Large baroque castle and ruins, emerging from a medieval hilltop castle. Former. Residence of the Solms-Hohensolms line.
- Schloss Hungen: Three-winged Renaissance castle
- Königsberg Castle: Castle-like villa building from the early 20th century on the site of a medieval hilltop castle. Remains of the previous system have been preserved.
- Schloss Llaubach: Emerged from a medieval moated castle, Renaissance and Baroque expansions.
- Schloss Lich: Four-wing complex of the late Renaissance that emerged from a medieval moated castle.
- Münzenberg Castle: ruined castle complex with two keep.
- Pouch Castle with a separate round keep of the former Pouch Castle, Anhalt-Bitterfeld district
- Rödelheim Castle, today Solmspark in Rödelheim: Located on the Nidda Island, it emerged from a classic landscape park that was created in 1879 around what was then the castle of the Count of Solms-Rödelheim. The castle was badly damaged during the Second World War and was later completely demolished.
- Rösa Castle, Anhalt-Bitterfeld district
- Sonnewalde Castle, Lower Lusatia
- Kasteel Weldam in Hof van Twente, Netherlands (since 1914 Solms-Sonnenwalde)
- Schloss Werdorf. Widow's residence: Small baroque palace.
- Schloss Wildenfels in Wildenfels, Zwickau district
- Schloss Wurschen, Upper Lusatia, reacquired in 1997
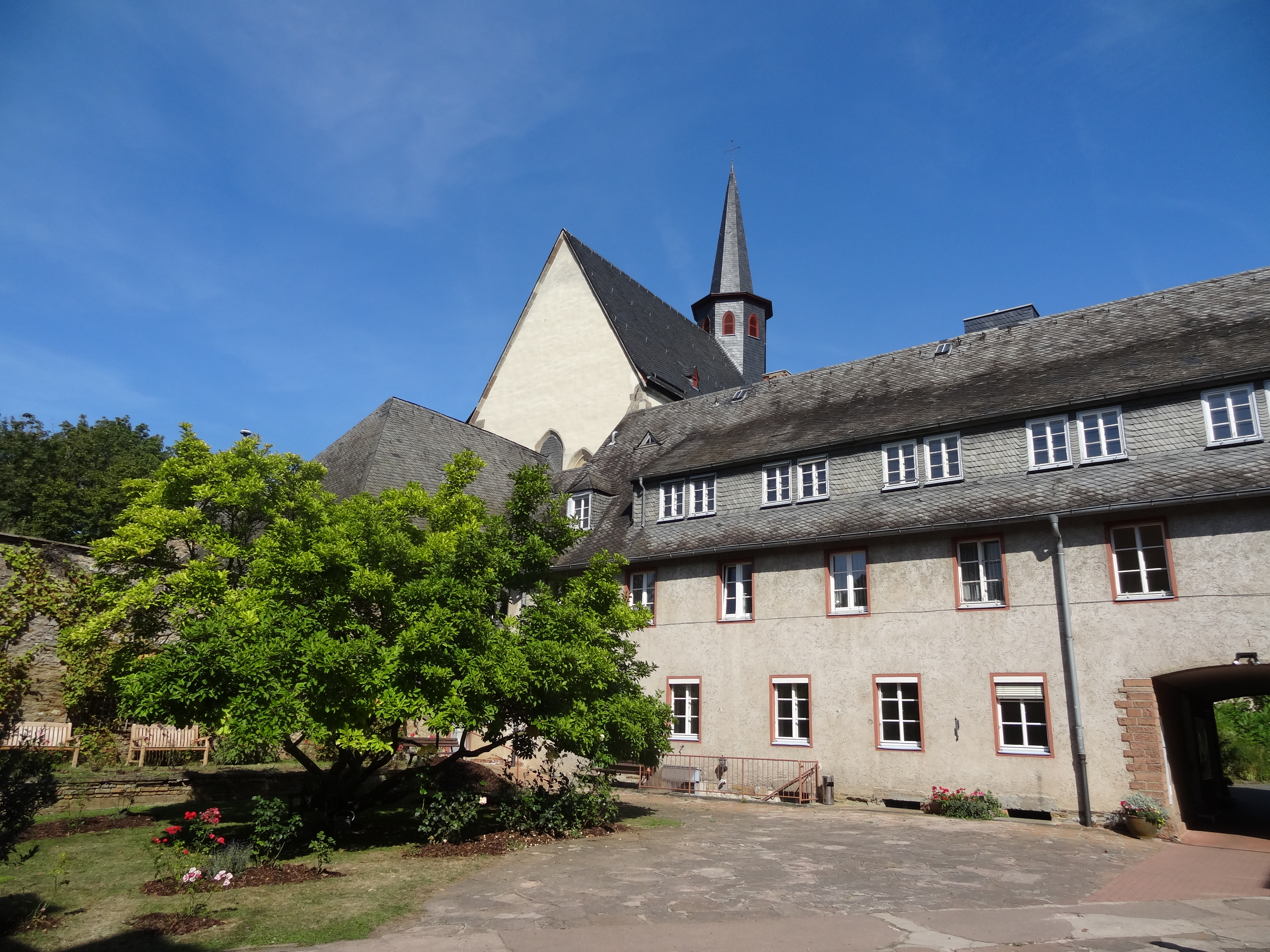
Alternberg Abbey on the Lahn

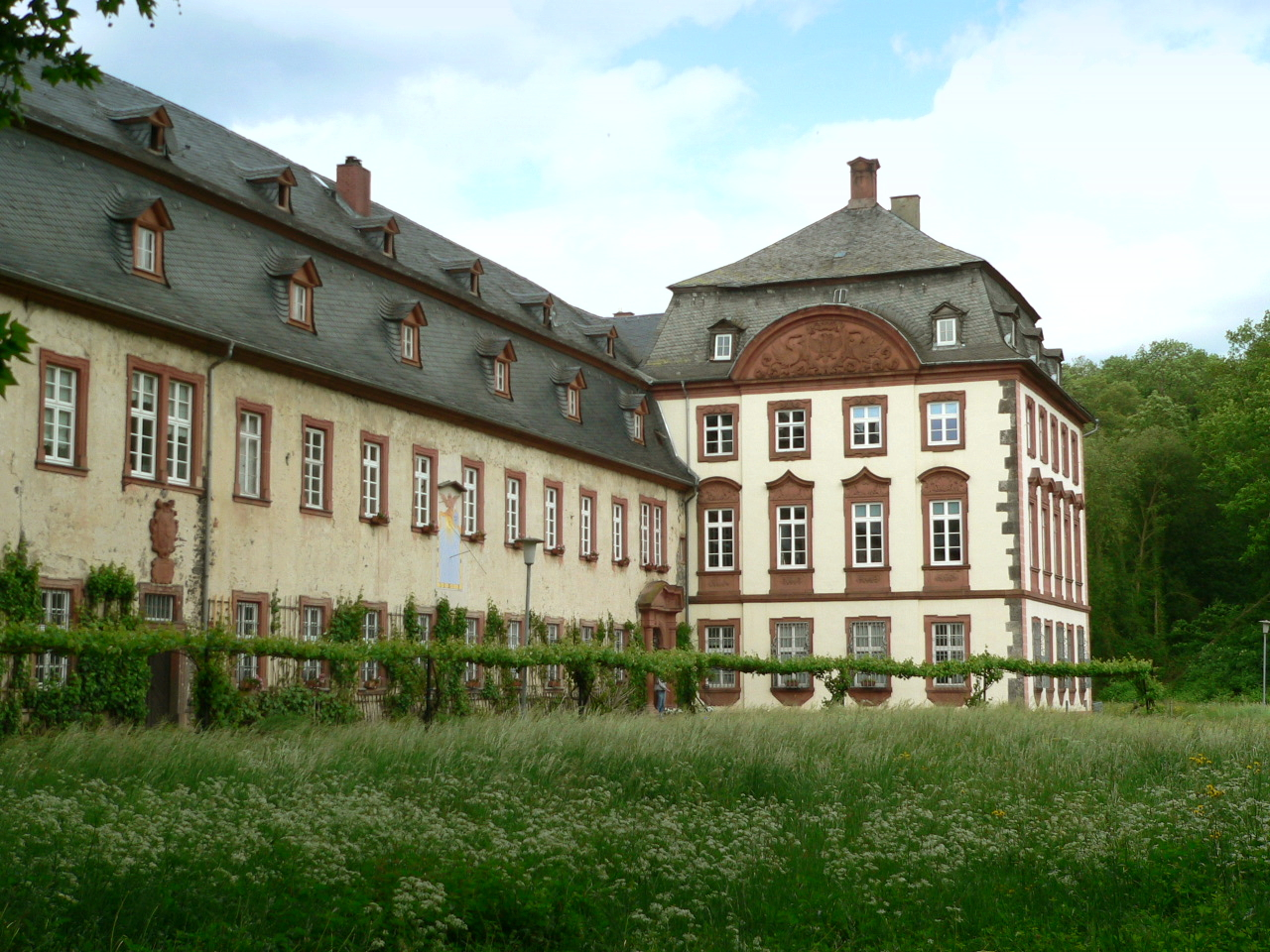
Arnsburg Abbey near Lich

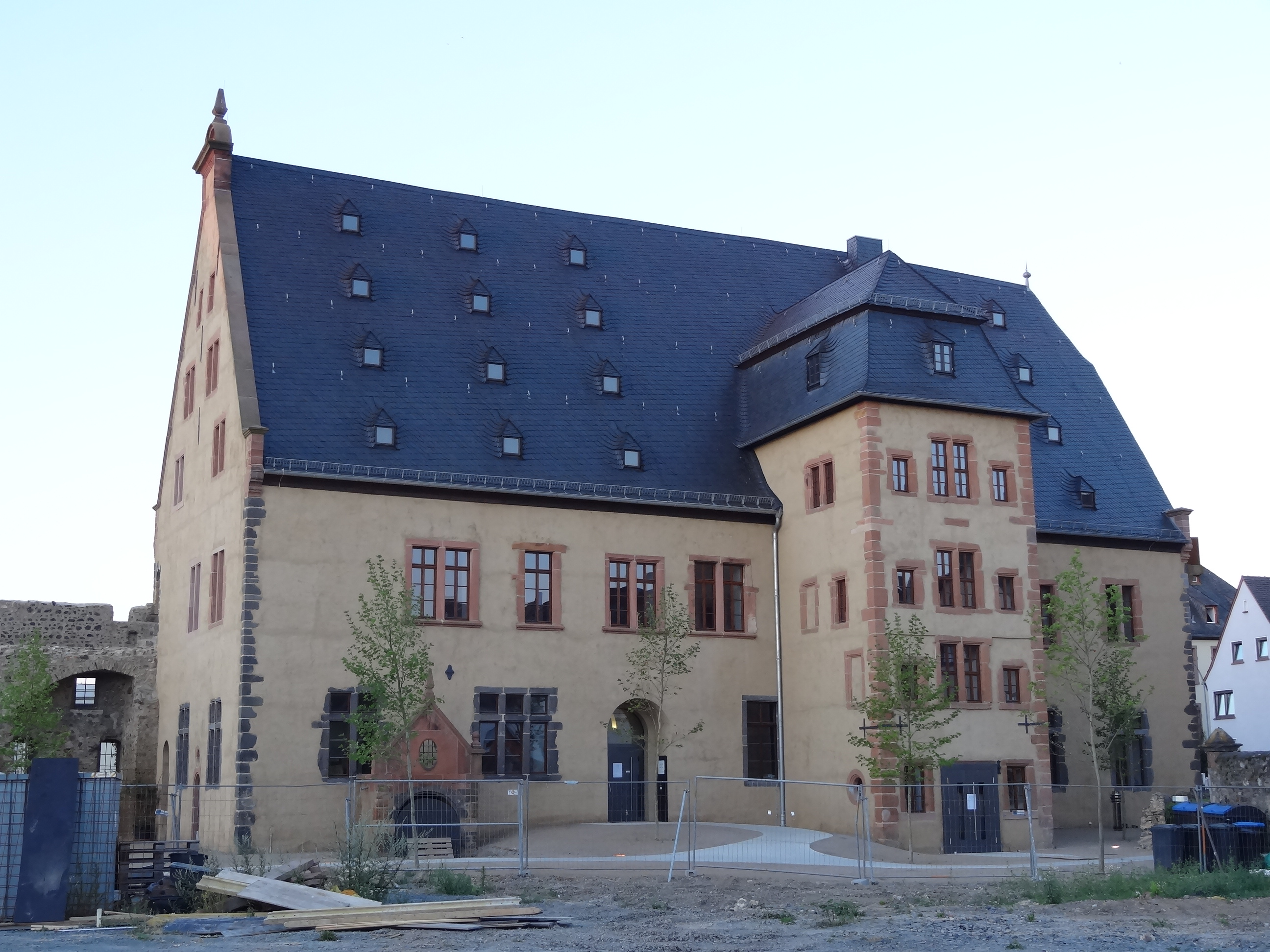
Solms Castle in Butzbach, Wetterau

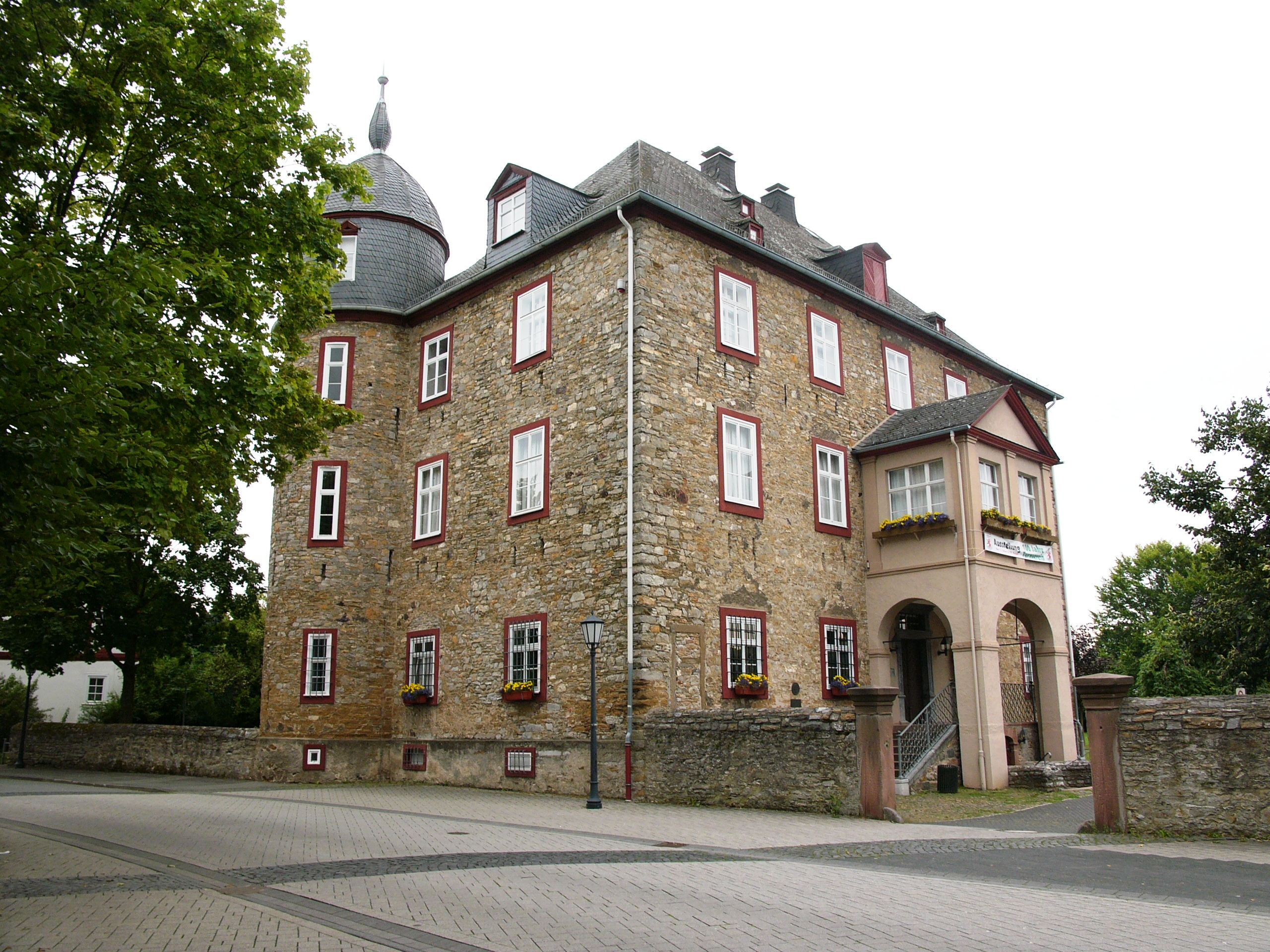
Schloss Werdorf, Lahn-Dill district

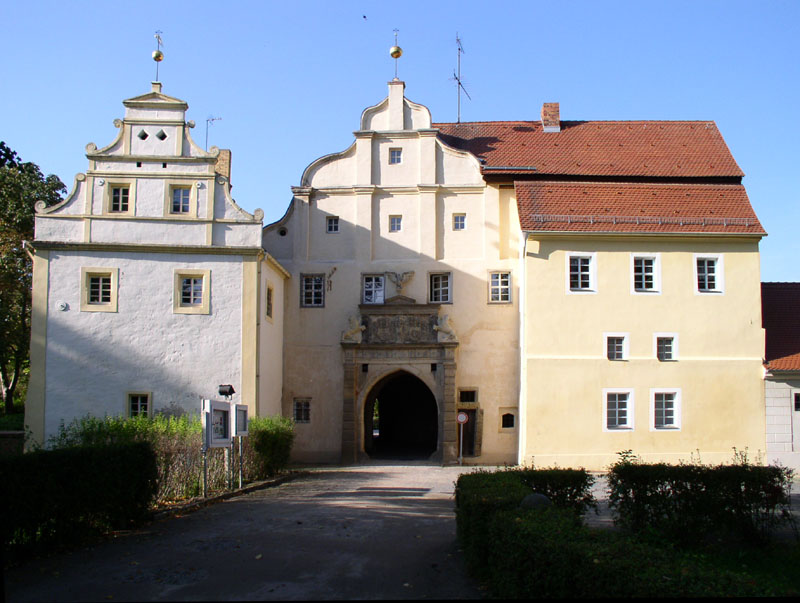
Vorderschloss Sonnewalde, Lower Lusatia

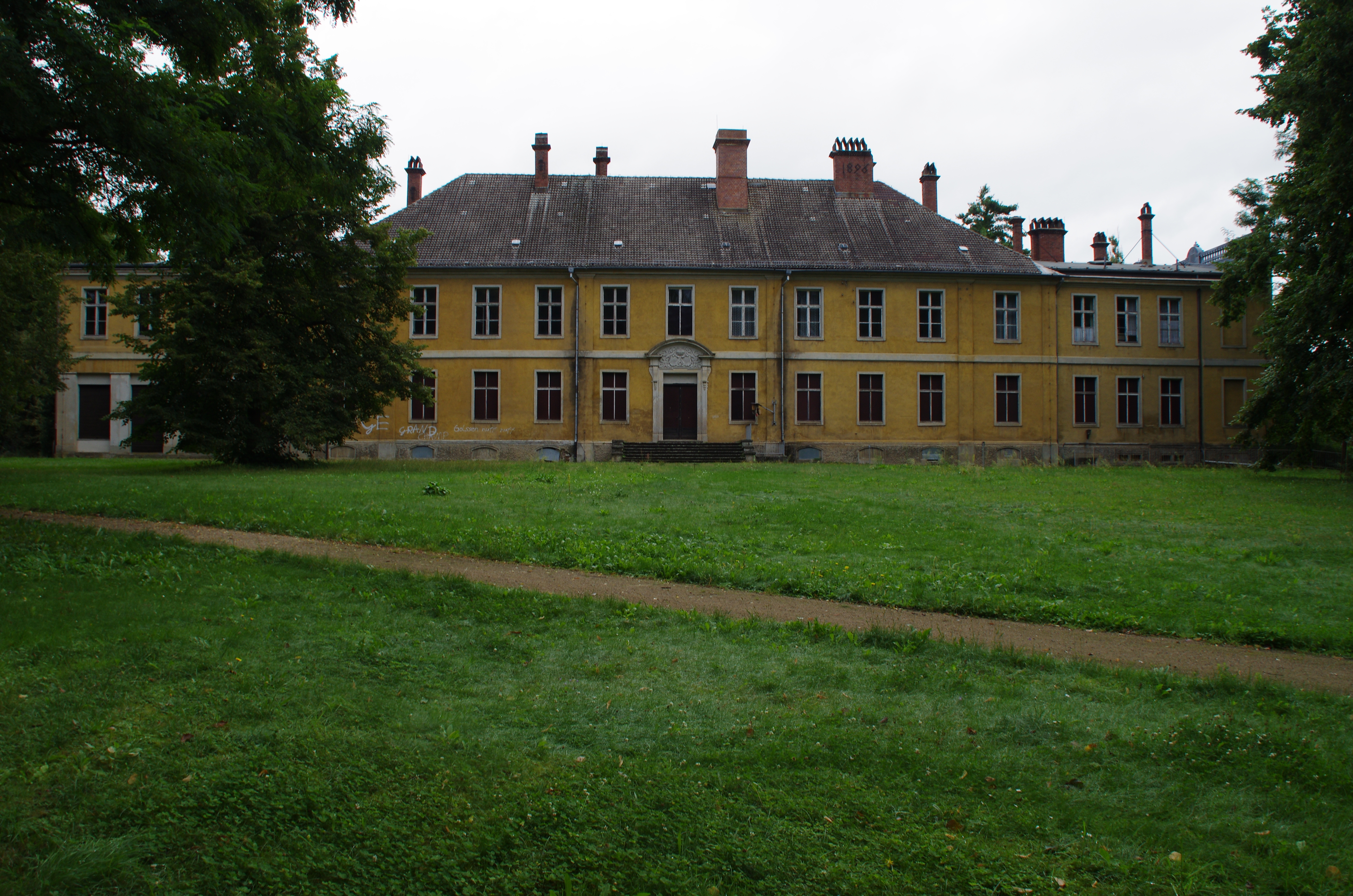
Golßen Castle, Lower Lusatia

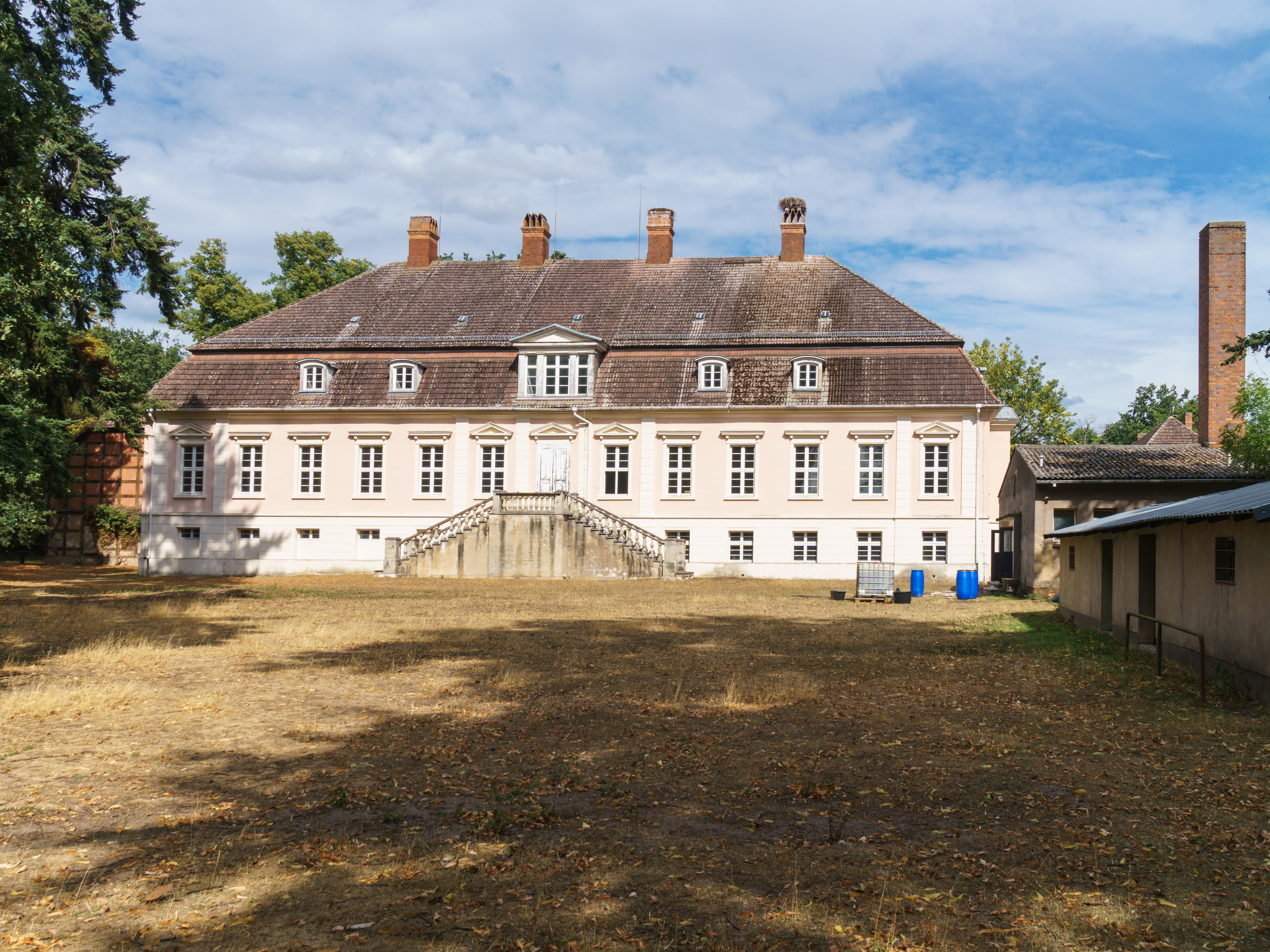
Kasel (Casel) manor, Lower Lusatia

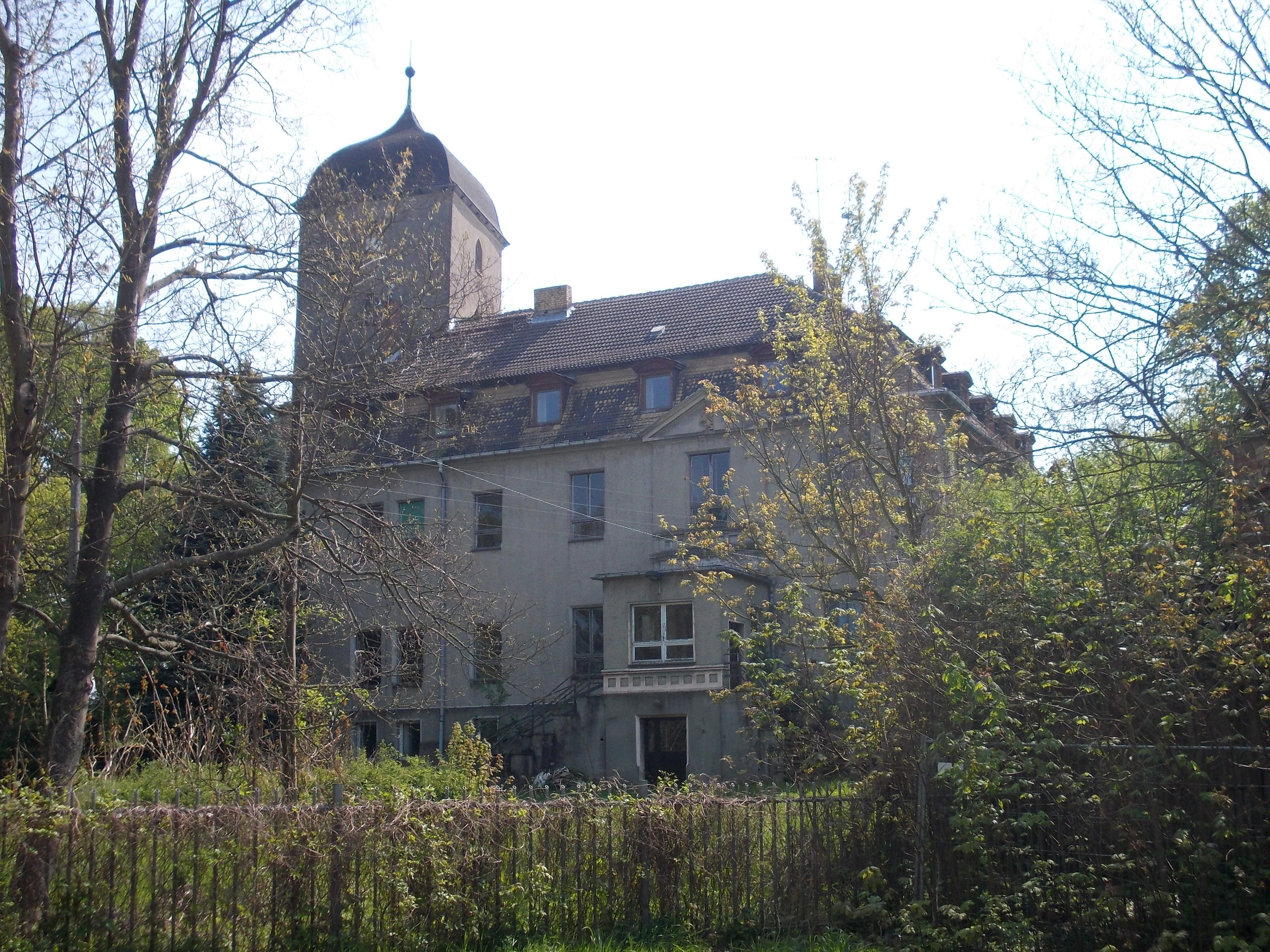
Pouch Castle, Anhalt-Bitterfeld district

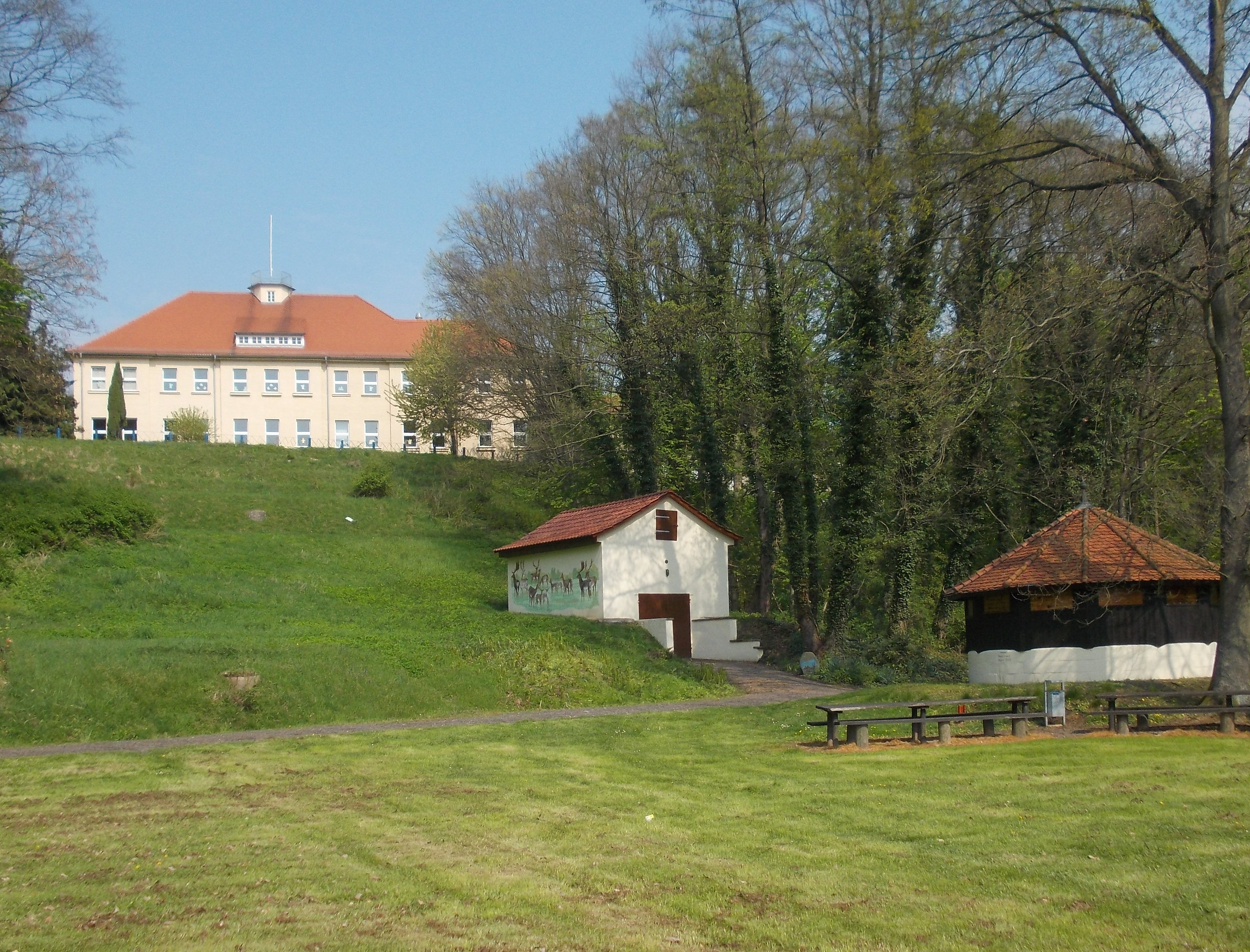
Rösa Castle, Anhalt-Bitterfeld district

== See also ==
- House of Nassau
- House of Hesse
