= Frederick Magnus I =

Count of Solms-Laubach

Frederick Magnus I, Count of Solms-Laubach
- Born: 1 October 1521
- Died: 13 January 1561 (aged 39); Laubach
- Noble family: House of Solms
- Spouse: Agnes of Wied
- Father: Otto of Solms-Laubach
- Mother: Anna of Mecklenburg-Schwerin

Frederick Magnus I, Count of Solms-Laubach (1521 – 13 January 1561 in Laubach) was regent of Solms-Laubach from 1522 to 1548, and the ruling Count of Solms-Laubach from 1548 until his death.

After the early death of his father Otto (1496–1522), Frederick Magnus I took up the government in his father's part of the County of Solms. He chose Laubach Castle as his permanent residence and gradually converted the castle into a palace. After the third division of Solms in 1548, Solms-Laubach became a separate principality, with Frederick Magnus I as its first ruler.

In 1540, Laubach became a fortress and a militia was established. This militia has been preserved to this day as the Laubach festival committee. Frederick Magnus I was a friend of the Reformer Philipp Melanchthon. He introduced the Reformation in Solms-Laubach in 1544. He abolished the inheritance tax and issued a simplified court order, which developed into the Civil Code of Solms. In 1555, he founded a Latin School, with teachers from Wittenberg. He also founded the library of Laubach, which now contains over 90000titles from the 16th century to the present. It is a listed monument and was registered under Heritage Protection Act in 1955.

Frederick Magnus I died in 1561 and was succeeded by his son John George I.

== Marriage and issue ==
In 1545, he married Agnes of Wied (1520 – 1588), daughter of Count John III of Wied and Elisabeth of Nassau-Siegen. They had the following children:

- John George I (6 November 1546 – 19 August 1600)
- Dorothea (26 November 1547–18 September 1585), married 1566 Heinrich XVI Reuss von Plauen zu Gera (29 December 1530 – 6 April 1572)
- Elisabeth (6 March 1549 – 1599), married Louis I, Count of Sayn-Wittgenstein
- Otto (24 June 1550 – 8 February 1612)
- Anna (11 April 1557 – 8 December 1586), married George III, Count of Erbach-Breuberg
