= Solms-Laubach =

County of southern Hesse and eastern Rhineland-Palatinate, Germany

County of Solms-Laubach Grafschaft Solms-Laubach
- 1544–1676; 1696–1806
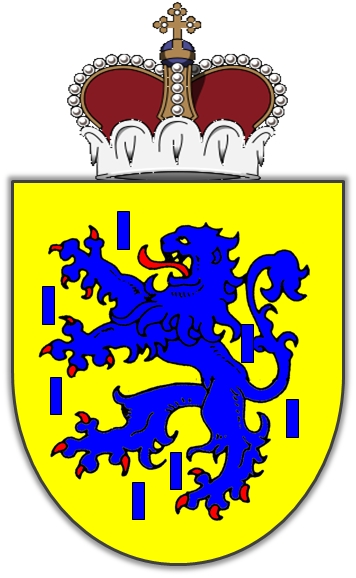
- Coat of arms
- Status: State of the Holy Roman Empire
- Capital: Laubach
- Government: Principality
- Historical era: Middle Ages
  - Partitioned from S-Lich: 1544
  - Partitioned to create Solms-Sonnenwalde: 1561
  - Partitioned to create S-Baruth & S-Rödelheim: 1607
  - Partitioned to create Solms-Sonnenwalde: 1627
  - Annexed to Solms-Baruth: 1676–96
  - Mediatised to Hesse: 1806
| Preceded by | Succeeded by |
| Solms-Lich | Grand Duchy of Hesse |

Original coat of arms of the Counts of Solms-Laubach

Solms-Laubach was a County of southern Hesse and eastern Rhineland-Palatinate, Germany. The House of Solms had its origins in Solms, Hesse.

== History ==
Solms-Laubach was originally created as a partition of Solms-Lich. In 1537 Philip, Count of Solms-Lich, ruling count at Lich, purchased the Herrschaft Sonnewalde in Lower Lusatia which he left to his younger son Otto of Solms-Laubach (1496–1522), together with the county of Laubach. While Lich and Laubach were counties with imperial immediacy, Sonnewalde remained a semi-independent state country within the March of Lusatia (the latter being an immediate state of the Holy Roman Empire). A later Count Otto (1550–1612) moved to Sonnewalde and built the castle in 1582. In 1596 he also purchased the nearby Herrschaft of Baruth which was also elevated to a state country within the March of Lusatia. The branch then was divided into the twigs of Solms-Laubach, Solms-Sonnewalde and Solms-Baruth.

Solms-Laubach partitioned between itself and Solms-Sonnenwalde in 1561; between itself, Solms-Baruth and Solms-Rödelheim 1607; and between itself and Solms-Sonnenwalde 1627. Solms-Laubach inherited Solms-Sonnenwalde in 1615. With the death of Count Charles Otto in 1676, it was inherited by Solms-Baruth and recreated as a partition in 1696. Solms-Laubach was mediatised to Hesse-Darmstadt in 1806.

The counts of Solms-Laubach still own Laubach Castle and Arnsburg Abbey. Until 1935, Münzenberg Castle also belonged to the estate.

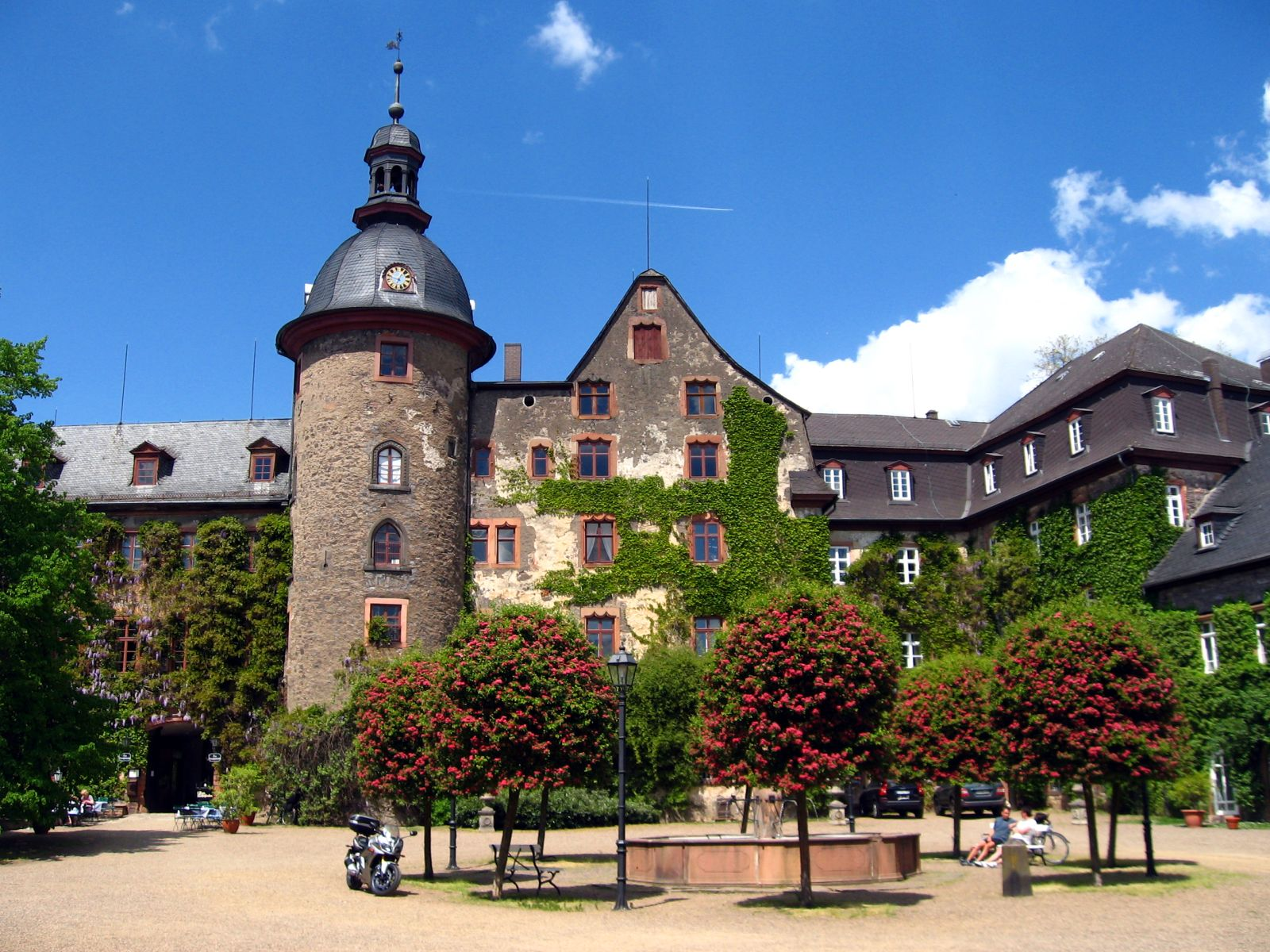
Laubach Castle.

== Counts of Solms-Laubach ==
=== First creation: 1544–1676 ===
- Frederick Magnus I (1544–61)
- John George (1561–1600)
- Albert Otto I (1600–10)
- Albert Otto II (1610–56)
- Charles Otto (1656–76)

=== Second creation: 1696–1806 ===
- Frederick Ernest (1696–1723)
- Christian Augustus (1723–84), with...
  - Frederick Magnus II (1723–38)
- Frederick Louis Christian (1784–1806)

=== Mediatized ===
- Friedrich Ludwig Christian, 5th Count 1806 (Mediatized)-1822 (1769–1822)
  - Otto, 6th Count 1822-1872 (1799–1872)
    - Friedrich, 7th Count 1872–1900 (1833–1900)
      - Otto, 8th Count 1900–1904 (1860–1904)
        - Georg, 9th Count 1904–1969 (1899–1969)
          - Otto, 10th Count 1969–1973 (1926–1973)
            - Karl, 11th Count 1973–present (b.1963)
              - August, Hereditary Count of Solms-Laubach (b.1994)
            - Count Gustav (b.1965)
              - Count Oscar (b.2008)
            - Count Franz (b.1971)
        - Count Friedrich (1902-1991)
          - Count Ernst (b.1939)
            - Count Stefan (b.1976)
      - Count Reinhard (1872-1937)
        - Count Hans (1927-2009)
          - Count Georg (b.1972)
    - Count Ernst (1837-1908)
      - Count Ernstotto (1890-1977)
        - Count Friedrich-Ernst (b.1940)
          - Count Moritz (b.1980)
          - Count Philipp (b.1985)

== Literature ==
- Rudolph zu Solms-Laubach: Geschichte des Grafen- und Fürstenhauses Solms. Adelmann, Frankfurt am Main 1865
