= Altenberg Abbey, Solms =

Premonstratensian nunnery in Hesse, Germany

Coordinates: 50°33′34″N 8°26′46″E

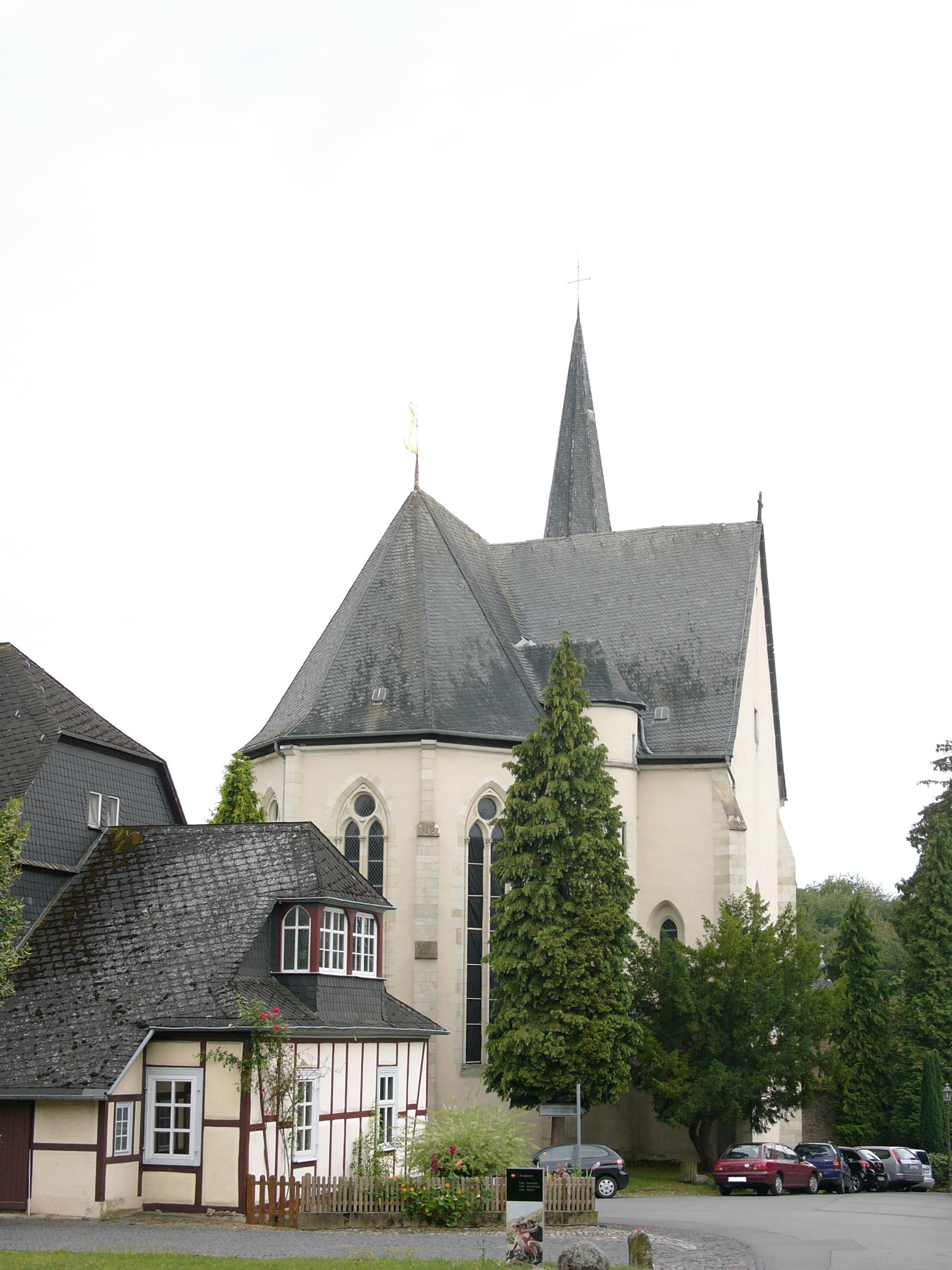
Abbey church.

Altenberg Abbey (German: Kloster Altenberg) is a former Premonstratensian nunnery situated between Solms and Wetzlar, Hesse, Germany. It was founded in c. 1170 and dissolved in 1802. It had a strong connection with the House of Nassau, several of whom were nuns and abbesses, and some family members, including Otto I, Count of Nassau, were buried here; it was also a burial place for the Counts of Solms. The buildings were seriously damaged by a fire in 1952. Those that survive accommodate a meeting centre for the local deanery and since 2018 a small Protestant religious community.
