= Schloss Laubach =

Castle in Laubach, Hesse, Germany

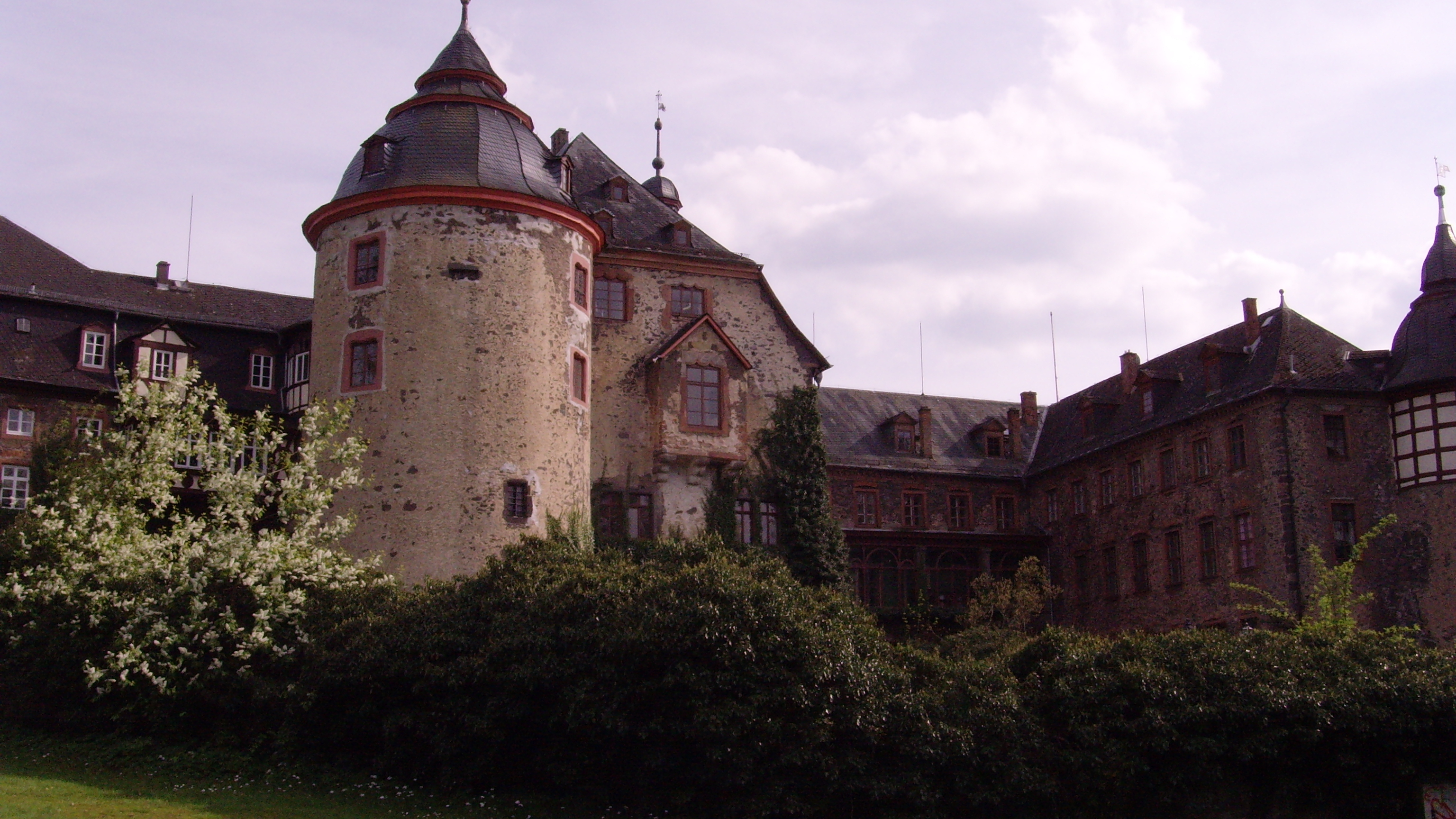

- Location within Germany
- 50°32′39.47″N 8°59′30.69″E
- Location: Laubach, Gießen, Hesse, Germany

Site notes
- Owner: House of Solms-Laubach

Schloss Laubach is a castle in Laubach, Hesse, Germany and serves as the seat of the Counts of Solms-Laubach.

Schloss Laubach is first mentioned in a list of properties of the Hersfeld monastery in 786 C.E. The Hagen-Münzenberg family were granted the authority over Laubach as a fief. A castle was built in the thirteenth century. In 1255 the estate was granted to the Lords of Hanau, and later it was owned by the Counts of Falkenstein. The Counts of Solms-Laubach bought the castle in 1418. Frederick Magnus I, Count of Solms-Laubach made the castle the official residence of the House of Solms-Laubach. In 1475 Kuno, Count of Solms-Laubach was granted permission by Frederick III, Holy Roman Emperor to add fortifications to the castle and the surrounding town. The architect Licher Baum Wolff Werner rebuilt the castle towers in 1533. The castle is made up of three horseshoe-shaped buildings that interlink. Three of the four original fortified round towers still stand, and baroque hoods were later added onto them.
