= Responsibility for the Holocaust =

Responsibility for the Holocaust has been the subject of historical debate concerning the development and origins of the Holocaust across Europe. While the responsibility for the Holocaust rests largely on Hitler and the Nazi Party's leadership, operations to persecute Jews, Poles, Romani people, homosexuals and others were also perpetrated by the Schutzstaffel (SS), the Wehrmacht, and ordinary German citizens, as well as by collaborationist members of various European governments, including soldiers and civilians. A host of factors contributed to the environment in which atrocities were committed across the continent, ranging from general racism (including antisemitism), religious hatred, blind obedience, apathy, political opportunism, coercion, profiteering, and xenophobia.

In academic circles, scholarship about the Holocaust's cause and intensification became known as the functionalism–intentionalism debate. Intentionalists such as Lucy Dawidowicz argue that Adolf Hitler planned the extermination of the Jewish people as early as 1918 and personally oversaw its execution. However, functionalists such as Raul Hilberg argue that the extermination plans evolved in stages, as a result of initiatives that were taken by bureaucrats in response to other policy failures. Contemporary Holocaust scholarship has largely moved beyond the once rigid opposition between "intentionalist" and "functionalist" paradigms, arriving instead at a more historically grounded synthesis: one that situates Hitler's ideological antisemitism and long-articulated vision of racial annihilation within the Third Reich's polycratic, competitive structures, where wartime contingency and cumulative bureaucratic radicalization converted doctrine into genocide. However, the functionalism–intentionalism debate covers the internal mechanisms within Nazi Germany itself and does not account for the broader antisemitism and the responsibility for the Holocaust borne by participant peoples and long-standing institutions throughout Europe.

== Historical and philosophical interpretations ==
The enormity of the Holocaust has prompted much analysis. The Holocaust has been characterized as a project of industrial extermination. This led authors such as Enzo Traverso to argue in The Origins of Nazi Violence that Auschwitz was explicitly a product of Western civilization originating from medieval religious and racial persecution that brought together a "particular kind of stigmatization...rethought in the light of colonial wars and genocides." (Note: Also see:Enzo Traverso, "Nazism’s roots in European culture—Production line of murder" in Le Monde diplomatique, February 2005) Beginning his book with a description of the guillotine, which according to him marks the entry of the Industrial Revolution into capital punishment, he writes: "Through an irony of history, the theories of Frederick Taylor" (taylorism) were applied by a totalitarian system to serve "not production, but extermination." (Note: Traverso also describes the colonial domination during the New Imperialism period through "rational organization", which led in a number of cases to extermination. However, this argument, which insists on the industrialization and technical rationality through which the Holocaust itself was carried out (the organization of trains, technical details, etc.—see Adolf Eichmann's bureaucratic work), was in turn opposed by other people. This argument is contrasted against the fact that the 1994 Rwandan genocide perpetrators mostly used machetes.)

Others like Russell Jacoby contend that the Holocaust is a product of German history with deep roots in German society which range from, "German authoritarianism, feeble liberalism, brash nationalism or virulent antisemitism. From A. J. P. Taylor's The Course of German History fifty-five years ago to Daniel Goldhagen's controversial work, Hitler's Willing Executioners, Nazism is understood as the outcome of a long history of uniquely German traits". While some claim that the specificity of the Holocaust was also rooted in the constant antisemitism from which Jews had been the target since the foundation of Christianity, intellectual historian George Mosse argued that the extreme form of European racism that led to the Holocaust fully emerged in the eighteenth century. Others argue that pseudo-scientific racist theories were elaborated upon in order to justify white supremacy and they were accompanied by the Darwinian belief in the survival of the fittest and eugenic notions of racial hygiene—particularly within the German scientific community. (Note: Not alone in the pursuit of eugenic endeavors, other national societies (especially the United States) were rife with racialist ideals. See for instance: Kühl, Stefan. The Nazi Connection: Eugenics, American Racism, and German National Socialism. New York: Oxford University Press, 2002.) (Note: In his works on "biopolitics" and in his lecture course at the College de France entitled, Society Must Be defended, French critical theorist and philosopher Michel Foucault argued that the Holocaust was a product of the modern polity as a "biological" notion, where whole populations "are at war with one another" and most of the time this "war" involves clever manipulation of social phenomena such as mass persuasion and Propaganda.)

== Authorization ==
The question of overall responsibility for the atrocities committed under the Nazi regime traverses the oligarchy of those in command, foremost among them the Nazi Party and Adolf Hitler. In October 1939, he authorized the first Nazi mass killing for those labeled "undesirables" in the T-4 Euthanasia Program. The Nazis termed such people as being "Lives unworthy of life." or lebensunwertes Leben in German. Before the euthanasia program in Germany-proper was over, the Nazis killed between 65,000 and 70,000 persons. Historian Henry Friedlander calls this period during which the 70,000 adults were killed, the "first phase" of the T4 Program since the program and its contributors precipitated the Holocaust. Sometime between late June 1940 when planning for Operation Barbarossa first started and March 1941, orders were approved by Hitler for the re-establishment of the Einsatzgruppen (the surviving historical record does not permit firm conclusions to be drawn about the precise date). Hitler encouraged the killings of the Jews of Eastern Europe by the Einsatzgruppen death squads in a speech of July 1941. Evidence suggests that in the fall of 1941, Reichsführer-SS Heinrich Himmler and Hitler agreed in principle on the complete mass extermination of the Jews of Europe by gassing, with Hitler explicitly ordering the "annihilation of the Jews" in a speech on 12 December 1941, by which time the Jewish populations in the Baltic states had been effectively eliminated. To make for smoother intra-governmental cooperation in the implementation of this so-called "Final Solution to the Jewish Question", the Wannsee Conference was held near Berlin on 20 January 1942, with the participation of fifteen senior officials, led by Reinhard Heydrich and Adolf Eichmann; the records of which provide the best evidence of the central planning of the Holocaust. Just five weeks later on 22 February, Hitler was recorded saying to his closest associates: "We shall regain our health only by eliminating the Jew."

=== Allied knowledge of the atrocities ===
The Mass Extermination of Jews in German Occupied Poland by the Polish government-in-exile addressed to the wartime allies of the then-United Nations in 1942

Upwards of 300 Jewish organizations attempted to provide information to U.S. President Franklin Roosevelt about the persecution of Jews in Europe, but the ethnic and cultural diversity of American immigrant Jewish communities and their comparative lack of political power in the U.S. hindered their ability to influence policy. Various strategies, such as ransoming Jews following the Anschluss of 1938, failed for a host of reasons, not to exclude the unwillingness and inability of Jewish communities in the U.S. to extend financial aid to their suffering brethren. Clear evidence exists that Winston Churchill was privy to intelligence reports derived from decoded German transmissions in August 1941, during which he stated:

Whole districts are being exterminated. Scores of thousands – literally scores of thousands – of executions in cold blood are being perpetrated by the German police-troops upon the Russian patriots who defend their native soil. Since the Mongol invasions of Europe in the sixteenth century, there has never been methodical, merciless butchery on such a scale, or approaching such a scale.

— Winston Churchill, 24 August 1941.

During the early years of the war, the Polish government-in-exile published documents and organised meetings to spread the word about the fate of Jews (see Witold Pilecki's Report). In the summer of 1942, a Jewish labor organization (the Bund) leader, Leon Feiner got word to London that 700,000 Polish Jews had already been murdered. The Daily Telegraph published it on 25 June 1942, and the BBC took the story seriously, though the U.S. State Department doubted it.

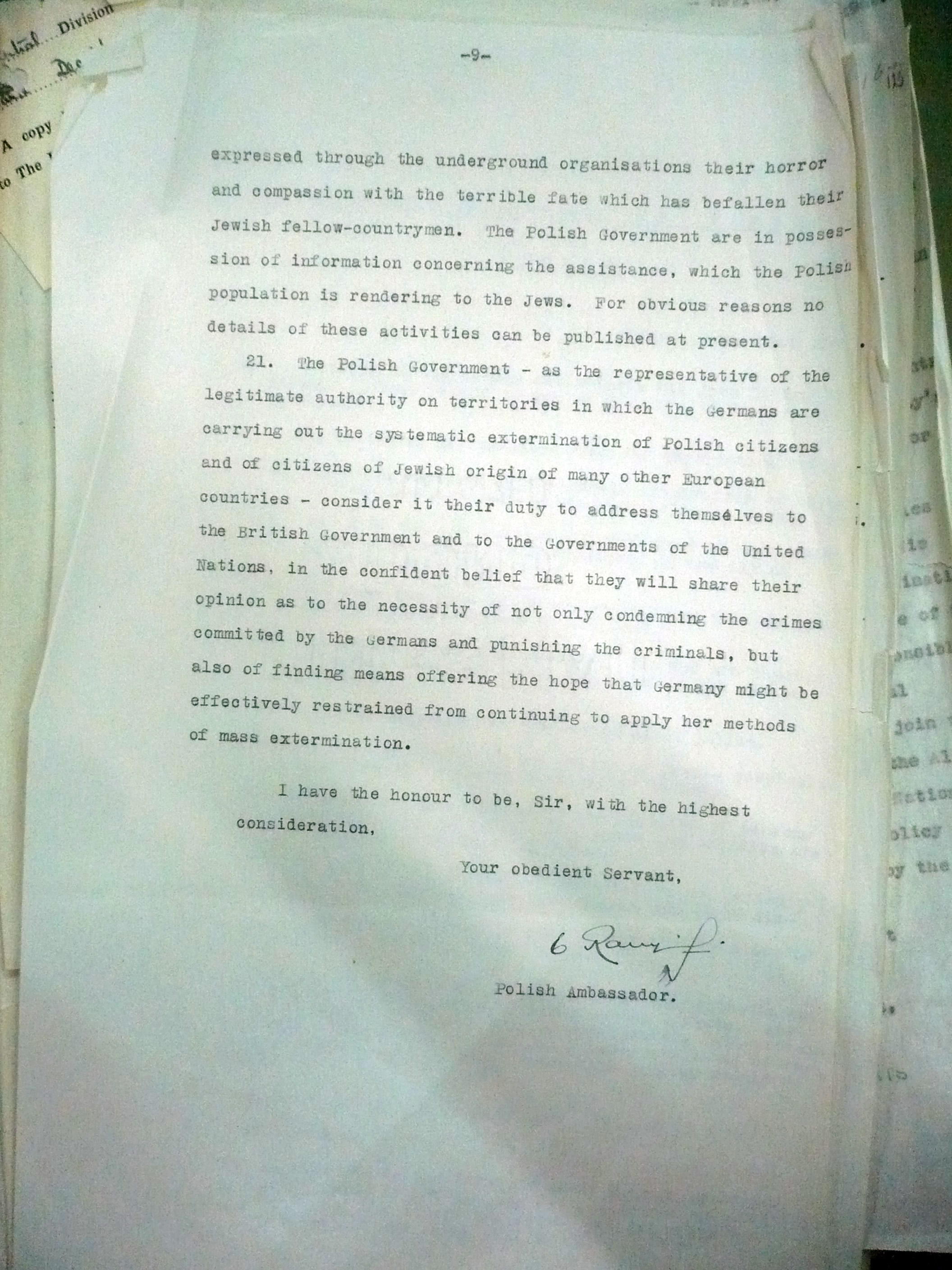
Last page of "Raczyński's Note", official note of Polish government-in-exile to Anthony Eden on 10 December 1942

On 10 August 1942, the Riegner Telegram to New York described the Nazi plan to murder all the Jews in the occupied states by deporting them to concentration camps in the east, to be exterminated in one blow, possibly by prussic acid, starting at autumn 1942. It was released in the United States by Stephen Wise of the World Jewish Congress in November 1942 after a long wait for permission from the government. This led to attempts by Jewish organizations to put President Roosevelt under pressure to act on behalf of the European Jews, many of whom had tried in vain to enter either Britain or the U.S.

Reports were also coming into Palestine about the German atrocities during the autumn of 1942. The allies received a detailed eyewitness account from Polish resistance fighter and later Georgetown University professor, Jan Karski. On 10 December 1942, the Polish government-in-exile published a 16-page report addressed to the Allied governments, titled The Mass Extermination of Jews in German Occupied Poland. (Note: See: Polish Ministry of Foreign Affairs (10 December 1942), The Mass Extermination of Jews in German Occupied Poland. Note to the Governments of the United Nations.)

On 17 December 1942, as the answer to Raczyński's Note, the Allies issued the Joint Declaration by Members of the United Nations, a formal declaration confirming and condemning Nazi extermination policy toward the Jews and describing the ongoing events of the Holocaust in Nazi-occupied Europe. The statement was read to British House of Commons in a floor speech by Foreign secretary Anthony Eden.

The death camps were discussed between American and British officials at the Bermuda Conference in April 1943. On 12 May 1943, Polish government-in-exile member and Bund leader Szmul Zygielbojm committed suicide in London to protest the inaction of the world with regard to the Holocaust, stating in part in his suicide letter:

I cannot continue to live and to be silent while the remnants of Polish Jewry, whose representative I am, are being killed. My comrades in the Warsaw ghetto fell with arms in their hands in the last heroic battle. I was not permitted to fall like them, together with them, but I belong with them, to their mass grave. By my death, I wish to give expression to my most profound protest against the inaction in which the world watches and permits the destruction of the Jewish people.

The large camps near Auschwitz were finally surveyed by plane in April 1944. While all important German cities and production centers were bombed by Allied forces until the end of the war, no attempt was made to interdict the system of mass annihilation by destroying pertinent structures or train tracks, even though Churchill was a proponent of bombing parts of the Auschwitz complex. The US State Department was aware of the use and the location of the gas chambers of extermination camps but refused to bomb them. Significant debate continues among historians about the decision. (Note: Also see: "The Holocaust: World Response" at the JewishVirtualLibrary.org) Throughout and after the war, the British government pressed leaders of European nations to prevent illegal Jewish immigration into Palestine and sent ships to block the sea-route there, turning back many Jewish refugees attempting to enter the region.

=== German people ===
The debate on how much average Germans knew about the Holocaust continues. Robert Gellately, a historian at Oxford University, conducted a widely respected survey of the German media both before and during the war and concluded that there was a substantial amount of participation and consent in various aspects of the Holocaust from large numbers of ordinary Germans; he also concluded that German civilians frequently saw columns of slave laborers and that the basics of the concentration camps and even extermination camps, were widely known. The German scholar, Peter Longerich, in a study looking at what Germans knew about the mass murders concluded that: "General information concerning the mass murder of Jews was widespread in the German population." Longerich estimates that before the war ended, 32 to 40 percent of the population had knowledge about mass killings (not necessarily the extermination camps).

British historian Nicholas Stargardt presents evidence of widespread public knowledge, agreement, and collusion concerning the destruction of European Jewry, the insane, feeble, disabled, Poles, Roma, and other nationals. His evidence includes speeches by Nazi leaders, which were broadcast or heard by a wide audience that included mention or inferences related to destroying the Jews, along with letters written between soldiers and their families describing the slaughter. Historian Claudia Koonz relates how reports from the Nazi security service (SD) described the public opinion as favorable where it concerned the killing of Jews. Using these same SD reports from the war years, along with a great many memoirs, diaries, and other descriptive material, historian Lawrence D. Stokes concluded that much, although not all, of the terror inflicted on the Jewish people was generally understood in the German public. Marlis Steinert came to an opposite conclusion through her own studies, contending that only a few were aware of the immense scale of the atrocities. French historian, Christian Ingrao, reminds readers that one must take into consideration the possible extent to which SD reports were manipulated by the Nazi propaganda machine when reviewing them. Historian Helmut Walser Smith remarks of the German people: "They were hardly indifferent to it; the responses range from outrage to affirmation to worry, especially toward the end of the war, when anxiety about accountability increased. That their imagination did not press to the particulars is not astounding. Nor is it astounding that few failed to imagine Auschwitz. The idea that not the killers go to the Jews, but the Jews are delivered up to industrial killing centers—this, in fact, was without historical precedent."

Historian Eric A. Johnson and sociologist Karl-Heinz Reuband conducted interviews with more than 3,000 Germans and 500 German Jews about daily life in the Third Reich. From the Jewish questionnaires, the authors found that German society was not nearly as rife with antisemitism as one might have believed, but this dramatically changed after Hitler's ascension to power. German Jews claimed that they knew of the Holocaust from a wide range of sources, which included radio broadcasts from Italy and what they heard from friends or acquaintances, but they did not know details until 1943. Responses from non-Jewish Germans indicate that "the majority of Germans identified with the Nazi regime." Contrary to many other accounts and/or historical interpretations, which portray rule under the Nazis as terrifying for German citizens, most of the German respondents who participated in the interviews stated that they never really feared arrest from the Gestapo. (Note: Even so, special courts (Sondergerichte) killed 12,000 Germans for their opposition to the Nazi regime.) Concerning the mass murder of the Jews, the survey results were contingent to some degree on geography, but roughly 27–29% of Germans had information about the Holocaust at some point before the war's end, and another 10–13% suspected something terrible was happening all along. Based on this information, Johnson and Reuband surmise that one-in-three Germans either heard or knew that the Holocaust was taking place before the end of the war from sources that included family members, friends, neighbors or professional colleagues. Johnson suggests (in disagreement with his co-author) that it is more likely that about 50% of the German population were aware of the atrocities being committed against the Jewish people and other enemies identified by the Nazi regime.

During the years 1945 through 1949, polls indicated that a majority of Germans felt that Nazism was a "good idea, badly applied". In a poll conducted in the American German occupation zone, 37% replied that 'the extermination of the Jews and Poles and other non-Aryans was necessary for the security of Germans'. (Note: For discussion of the psychological war campaign concerning the idea of collective guilt, see: Denazification) Sarah Ann Gordon in Hitler, Germans, and the Jewish Question notes that the surveys are very difficult to draw conclusions from as respondents were given only three options from which to choose: (1) Hitler was right in his treatment of the Jews, to which 0% agreed; (2) Hitler went too far in his treatment of the Jews, but something had to be done to keep them in bounds - 19% agreed; and (3) The actions against the Jews were in no way justified - 77% agreed. She also noted that another revealing example emerges from the question of whether an Aryan who marries a Jew should be condemned, a question to which 91% of the respondents answered "No". To the question: "All those who ordered the murder of civilians or participated in the murders should be made to stand trial", 94% responded "Yes".

Historian Tony Judt highlights how the lightly applied denazification process by the Allies likely obscured justice some of the perpetrators were almost certainly owed. Public recollection from Germans about the atrocities was also "marginalized by postwar reconstruction and diplomacy" according to historian Nicholas Wachsmann; a delay, which obscured the complexities of understanding both the Holocaust and the concentration camps that aided its facilitation. Wachsmann notes how the German people often claimed that the crimes occurred behind their backs and were perpetrated by Nazi fanatics, or that they frequently dodged responsibility by equating their suffering with that of the prisoners, avowing they too had been victimized by the National Socialist regime. Initially the memory of the Holocaust was repressed and set aside, but eventually, the young Federal Republic of Germany commenced its own investigations and trials. Political pressure on the prosecutors and judges tempered any extensive probes and very few systematic investigations in the first decade after the war took place. Later research efforts in Germany revealed that there were a "myriad" of links between the wider population and the SS camps. In Austria—once part of the Greater German Reich of the Nazis—the situation was much different, as they conveniently evaded accountability through the trope of being the Nazis' first foreign victim.

=== Implementation ===
During the perpetration of the Holocaust, participants came from all over Europe but the impetus for the pogroms was provided by German and Austrian Nazis. According to Holocaust historian, Raul Hilberg, the "anti-Jewish work" of the regime was "carried out in the civil service, the military, business, and the party" where "every specialization was utilized" and "every stratum of society was represented in the envelopment of the victims." Sobibor death camp guard Werner Dubois stated:

I am clear about the fact that annihilation camps were used for murder. What I did was aiding in murder. If I should be sentenced, I would consider that correct. Murder is murder. In weighing the guilt, one should not in my opinion consider the specific function in the camp. Wherever we were posted there: we were all equally guilty. The camp functioned in a chain of functions. If only one element in that chain is missing, the entire enterprise comes to a stop.

In an entry in the Friedrich Kellner diary, "My Opposition", dated 28 October 1941, the German justice inspector recorded a conversation he had in Laubach with a German soldier who had witnessed a massacre in Poland. (Note: In the same entry, Kellner wrote that "ninety-nine percent of the German population is guilty, directly or indirectly.") French officials at the Parisian branch of the Barclays Bank volunteered the names of their Jewish employees to Nazi authorities, and many of them ended up in the death camps. An insightful perspective is provided by Konnilyn G. Feig, who wrote:

Hitler exterminated the Jews of Europe. But he did not do so alone. The task was so enormous, complex, time-consuming, and mentally and economically demanding that it took the best efforts of millions of Germans... All spheres of life in Germany actively participated: Businessmen, policemen, bankers, doctors, lawyers, soldiers, railroad and factory workers, chemists, pharmacists, foremen, production managers, economists, manufacturers, jewelers, diplomats, civil servants, propagandists, film makers and film stars, professors, teachers, politicians, mayors, party members, construction experts, art dealers, architects, landlords, janitors, truck drivers, clerks, industrialists, scientists, generals, and even shopkeepers—all were essential cogs in the machinery that accomplished the final solution.

Additional scholars also point out that a wide range of German soldiers, officials, and civilians were in some way involved in the Holocaust, from clerks and officials in the government to units of the army, police, and the SS. (Note: Also see: Browning, Christopher R. Ordinary Men: Reserve Police Battalion 101 and the Final Solution in Poland, New York, Harper Collins, 1992.) Many ministries, including those of armaments, interior, justice, railroads, and foreign affairs, had substantial roles in orchestrating the Holocaust; similarly, German physicians participated in medical experiments and the T-4 euthanasia program as did civil servants; German physicians also made the selections as to who was fit to work and who would die at the concentration camps. Though there was no single department in charge of the Holocaust, the SS and Waffen-SS under Himmler had a leading role and operated with military efficiency in murdering enemies of the Nazi state. From the SS came the SS-Totenkopfverbände concentration camp guard units, the Einsatzgruppen killing squads, and the main administrative offices behind the Holocaust, including the RSHA and WVHA. The regular army participated in the atrocities along with the SS on some occasions by taking part in the massacre of Jews in the Soviet Union, Serbia, Poland, and Greece. The German Army also logistically supported the Einsatzgruppen, helped form the ghettos, ran prison camps, occasionally provided concentration camp guards, transported prisoners to camps, had medical experiments performed on prisoners, and substantially used slave labor. Significant numbers of Wehrmacht soldiers accompanied the SS in their deadly tasks or provided other forms of support for killing operations. The murders by the Einsatzgruppen required cooperation between the Einsatzgruppen chief and Wehrmacht unit commander so they could coordinate and control access to and from the execution grounds.

=== Obedience ===
Stanley Milgram was one of a number of post-war psychologists and sociologists who tried to address why people obeyed immoral orders in the Holocaust. Milgram's findings demonstrated that reasonable people, when instructed by a person in a position of authority, obeyed commands entailing what they believed to be the suffering of others. After making his results public, Milgram sparked a direct critical response in the scientific community by claiming that "a common psychological process is centrally involved in both" his laboratory experiments and the Holocaust. Professor James Waller, Chair of Holocaust and Genocide Studies at Keene State College, formerly Chair of Whitworth College Psychology Department, expressed the opinion that Milgram experiments "do not correspond well" to the Holocaust events:

1. The subjects of Milgram's experiments were assured in advance that "no permanent physical damage would result from their actions." However, the Holocaust perpetrators were fully aware of their hands-on killing and maiming of the victims.
2. Milgram's guards did not know their victims and were not motivated by racism. On the other hand, the Holocaust perpetrators displayed an "intense devaluation of the victims" through a lifetime of personal development.
3. The subjects were not selected for sadism or loyalty to Nazi ideology, and often "exhibited great anguish and conflict" in the experiment, unlike the designers and executioners of the Final Solution (see Holocaust trials), who had a clear "goal" on their hands, set beforehand.
4. The experiment lasted for an hour, insufficient time for participants to consider the moral implications of their actions. Meanwhile, the Holocaust lasted for years with ample time for a moral assessment of all individuals and organizations involved.

In the opinion of Thomas Blass—who is the author of a scholarly monograph on the experiment (The Man Who Shocked The World) published in 2004—the historical evidence pertaining to actions of the Holocaust perpetrators speaks louder than words:

My own view is that Milgram's approach does not provide a fully adequate explanation of the Holocaust. While it may well account for the dutiful destructiveness of the dispassionate bureaucrat who may have shipped Jews to Auschwitz with the same degree of routinization as potatoes to Bremerhaven, it falls short when one tries to apply it to the more zealous, inventive, and hate-driven atrocities that also characterized the Holocaust.

=== Religious hatred and racism ===
Throughout the Middle Ages in Europe, Jews were subjected to antisemitism based on Christian theology, which blamed them for rejecting and killing Jesus (see Jewish deicide). Numerous attempts to convert the Jews to Christianity in the collective were made by early Christians, but when they refused to convert to Christianity, this made them "pariahs" in the eyes of many Europeans. The consequences which they suffered for resisting conversion to Christianity were varied. An extensive series of attacks was committed against Jews as a result of the religious fervor which accompanied the First and Second Crusades (1095–1149). Jews were slaughtered in the wake of the Italian famine (1315–1317), they were attacked following the outbreak of the Black Death in the Rhineland in 1347, they were expelled from England and Italy in the 1290s, they were expelled from France in 1306 and 1394, and they were expelled from Spain and Portugal in 1492 and 1497. By the time of the Reformation in the 16th century, historian Peter Hayes stresses that "hatred of Jews was widespread" throughout Europe.

Martin Luther (a German leader of the Protestant Reformation) made a specific written call for the harsh persecution of the Jewish people in On the Jews and Their Lies, published in 1543. In it, he urged that Jewish synagogues and schools should be set on fire, Jewish prayer books destroyed, rabbis forbidden from preaching, the homes of Jews razed, and the property and money of Jews confiscated. Luther argued that Jews should be shown no mercy or kindness, receive no legal protection and went so far as to state that these "poisonous envenomed worms" should be drafted into forced labor or expelled for all time. American historian Lucy Dawidowicz asserted in her book The War Against the Jews that a clear path of antisemitism passes from Luther to Hitler and that "modern German anti-Semitism is the bastard child of Christian anti-Semitism and German nationalism." Even after the Reformation, Catholics and Lutherans continued to persecute Jews, accusing them of blood libels and subjecting them to pogroms and expulsions. The second half of the 19th century saw the emergence of the Völkisch movement in Germany and Austria-Hungary, which was developed and incentivized by authors like Houston Stewart Chamberlain and Paul de Lagarde. The movement advocated racial antisemitism, a form of scientific racism, a pseudo-scientific, biologically based form of racism that viewed Jews as a race which was locked in mortal combat for world domination with the Aryan race.

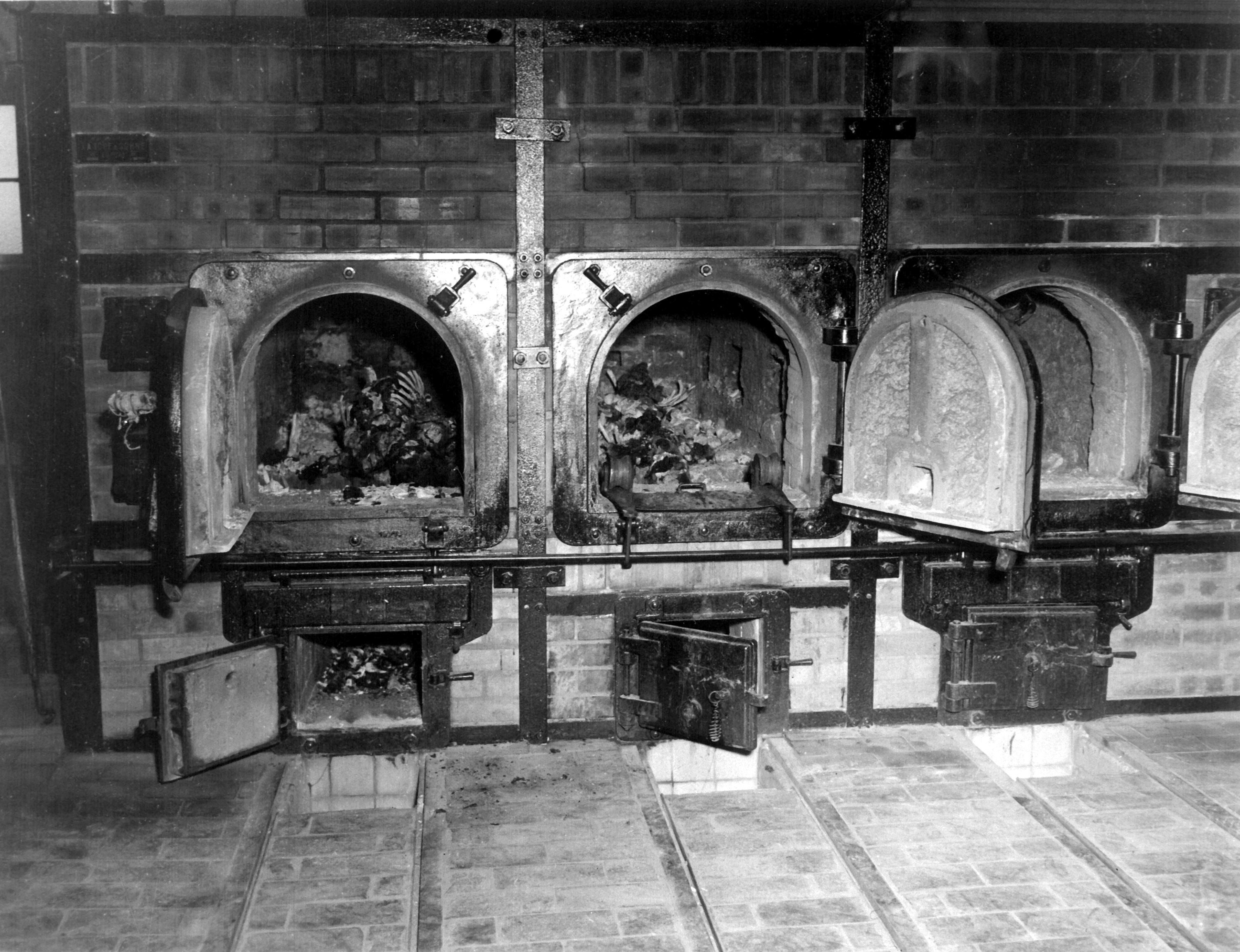
Bones of murdered prisoners in the crematoria in the German concentration camp at Weimar, Germany in a photo taken by the 3rd U.S. Army on 14 April 1945

Some authors, such as the liberal philosopher Hannah Arendt in The Origins of Totalitarianism (1951), Swedish writer Sven Lindqvist, historian Hajo Holborn, and Ugandan academic Mahmood Mamdani, have also linked the Holocaust to colonialism, but moreover, they place the tragedy in the context of the European tradition of antisemitism and the genocide of colonized peoples. For instance, Arendt claimed that nationalism and imperialism were literally bridged together by racism. Pseudo-scientific theories which were elaborated upon during the 19th century (e.g. in Arthur de Gobineau's 1853 Essay on the Inequality of the Human Races) were fundamental in preparing the conditions for the Holocaust according to some scholars. Other historical episodes of wholesale slaughter occurred before the Holocaust, however, some scholars still adamantly believe that unlike other genocides, the "Holocaust was a unique event". The philosopher Michel Foucault also traced the origins of the Holocaust to "racial policies" and "state racism", which are subsumed within the framework of "biopolitics".

The Nazis considered it their duty to overcome natural compassion and execute orders for what they believed were higher ideals; in particular, members of the SS perceived that they had a state-legitimized mandate and an obligation to eliminate those who they perceived as being their racial enemies (see Ideology of the SS). Some of the heinous acts committed by the Nazis have been attributed to crowd psychology, and Gustave Le Bon's The Crowd: A Study of the Popular Mind (1895) provided influence to Hitler's infamous tome, Mein Kampf. Le Bon claimed that Hitler and the Nazis used propaganda to deliberately shape group-think and related behaviors, especially in cases where people committed otherwise aberrant violent acts due to the anonymity resultant from being a member of the collective. Sadistic acts of this sort were notable in the case of the genocide which was committed by members of the Croatian Ustaše, whose enthusiasm and sadism in their killings of Serbs appalled the Italians and the Germans to the point that the German Army field police "moved in and disarmed them" at one point. One might describe the behavior of the Croatians as a sort of quasi-religious eliminationist opportunism, but this same thing might be said of the Germans, whose antisemitism was likewise religious and racialist in nomenclature.

A controversy erupted in 1997 when historian Daniel Goldhagen argued in Hitler's Willing Executioners that ordinary Germans were knowing and willing participants in the Holocaust, which he writes, had its roots in a deep racially motivated eliminationist antisemitism that was uniquely manifested in German society. Historians who disagree with Goldhagen's thesis argue that, while antisemitism undeniably existed in Germany, Goldhagen's idea of a uniquely German "eliminationist" version is untenable. In complete contrast to Goldhagen's position, historian Johann Chapoutot observes,

Culturally speaking, the Nazi ideology advanced by the NSDAP contained only an infinitesimal number of ideas that were genuinely German in origin. Racism, colonialism, anti-Semitism, social Darwinism, and eugenics did not originate between the Rhine and the Memel. Practically speaking, we know the Shoah would have been considerably less murderous if French and Hungarian police forces—not to mention Baltic nationalists, Ukrainian volunteer forces, Polish anti-Semites, and collaborationist politicians, to name only a few—had not supported it so fully and so swiftly: whether or not they knew where the convoys were headed, they were more than happy to rid themselves of their Jewish populations.

== Functionalism versus intentionalism ==
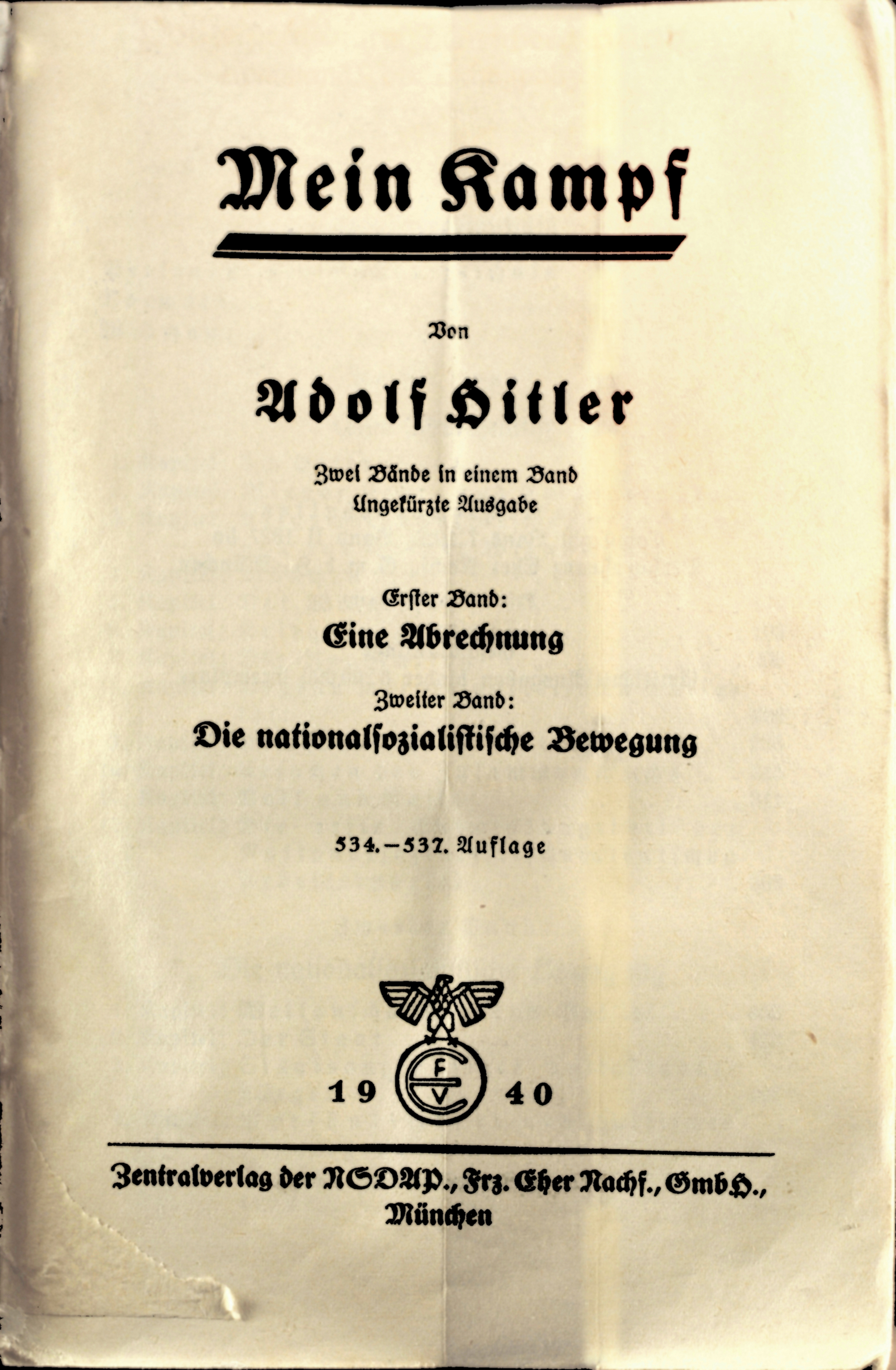
Frontispiece of the Nuremberg trials 1940 copy of Mein Kampf

A major issue in contemporary Holocaust studies is the question of functionalism versus intentionalism. The terms were coined during the Cumberland Lodge Conference in May 1979 which was entitled, "The National Socialist Regime and German Society" by the British Marxist historian Timothy Mason in order to describe two schools of thought about the origins of the Holocaust.

Intentionalists hold the view that the Holocaust was the result of a long-term master plan on the part of Hitler, and they also believe that he was the driving force behind it. However, functionalists hold the view that Hitler did not have a master plan for genocide and based on this view, they see the Holocaust as coming from the ranks of the German bureaucracy, with little or no involvement on the part of Hitler. Within the content of Hitler biographies which were written by Joachim Fest and Alan Bullock, one encounters a "Hitler-centric explanation for genocide" even though other psycho-historians like Rudolph Binion, Walter Langer, and Robert Waite raised issues about Hitler's ability to make rational decisions; nonetheless, his antisemitism remained unquestioned, the latter authors merely juxtaposed it against his general mental health.

Historian and intentionalist Lucy Dawidowicz argued that the Holocaust was planned by Hitler from the very beginning of his political career, which can be traced back to his traumatic experience at the end of the First World War. Other intentionalists, such as Andreas Hillgruber, Karl Dietrich Bracher, and Klaus Hildebrand, have suggested that Hitler had decided upon the Holocaust sometime in the early 1920s. Historian Eberhard Jäckel postulates that the extermination order placed upon the Jews may have occurred during the summer of 1940. Another intentionalist historian, the American Arno J. Mayer, argued that Hitler first ordered the mass murder of the Jews in December 1941, due principally to the failed Blitzkrieg against the Soviet Union. Saul Friedländer has argued that Hitler was an extreme antisemite early on and drove Nazi policy to exterminate the Jews, but he also recognizes the technocratic rationality of the regime that helped bring Hitler's ideological goals to fruition. While others, like Gerhard Weinberg, remain in the intentionalist camp and see Hitler's part as essential to the unfolding of the Final Solution—he also points out the importance of Nazi ideological imperatives such as the Wannsee Conference, and like many scholars, demonstrates that there is still "much to be discovered and learned."

Functionalists such as Hans Mommsen, Martin Broszat, Götz Aly, Raul Hilberg, and Christopher Browning hold that the Holocaust was started in 1941–1942 either as a result of the failure of the Nazi deportation policy and/or the impending military losses in Russia. Functionalists contend that what some see as extermination fantasies outlined in Hitler's Mein Kampf and other Nazi literature were simply propaganda and did not constitute concrete plans. In Mein Kampf, Hitler repeatedly states his inexorable hatred of the Jewish people, but nowhere does he proclaim his intention to exterminate them. They also argue that, in the 1930s, Nazi policy aimed at making life so unpleasant for German Jews that they would leave Germany. Adolf Eichmann was in charge of facilitating Jewish emigration by whatever means possible from 1937 until 23 October 1941, when German Jews were forbidden to leave. Functionalists see the SS's support in the late 1930s for Zionist groups as the preferred solution to the "Jewish Question" as another sign that there was no masterplan for genocide. Essentially the view of functionalists concerning the Holocaust is that it came about via improvisation as opposed to deliberate planning.

To that end, functionalists argue that, in German documents from 1939 to 1941, the term "Final Solution to the Jewish Question" was meant to be a "territorial solution"; that is, the entire Jewish population was to be expelled somewhere far from Germany. At first, the SS planned to create a gigantic Jewish reservation in the Lublin, Poland area, but the so-called "Lublin Plan" was vetoed by Hans Frank, the Governor-General of occupied Poland, who refused to allow the SS to ship any more Jews to the Lublin area after November 1939. The reason Frank vetoed the "Lublin Plan" was not due to any humane motives, but rather because he was opposed to the SS "dumping" Jews into the Government-General. In 1940, the SS and the German Foreign Office had the so-called "Madagascar Plan" to deport the entire Jewish population of Europe to a "reservation" on Madagascar. The "Madagascar Plan" was canceled because Germany could not defeat the United Kingdom and until their blockade of Nazi-occupied Europe was broken, the "Madagascar Plan" could not be put into effect. Finally, functionalist historians have made much of a memorandum written by Himmler in May 1940 explicitly rejecting extermination of the entire peoples as "un-German" and recommending to Hitler instead, the "Madagascar Plan" as the preferred "territorial solution" to the "Jewish Question". Not until July 1941 did the term "Final Solution to the Jewish Question" come to mean extermination.

Recently, a synthesis of the two schools has emerged that has been championed by diverse historians such as the Canadian historian Michael Marrus, the Israeli historian Yehuda Bauer, and the British historian Ian Kershaw that contends Hitler was the driving force behind the Holocaust, but that he did not have a long-term plan and that much of the initiative for the Holocaust came from below in an effort to meet Hitler's perceived wishes. As historian Omer Bartov relates, "the "intentionalists" and "functionalists" have gradually come closer, as further research now seems to indicate that the more extreme new interpretations are just as impossible to sustain as the traditional ones."

== Involved ==
=== Adolf Hitler ===
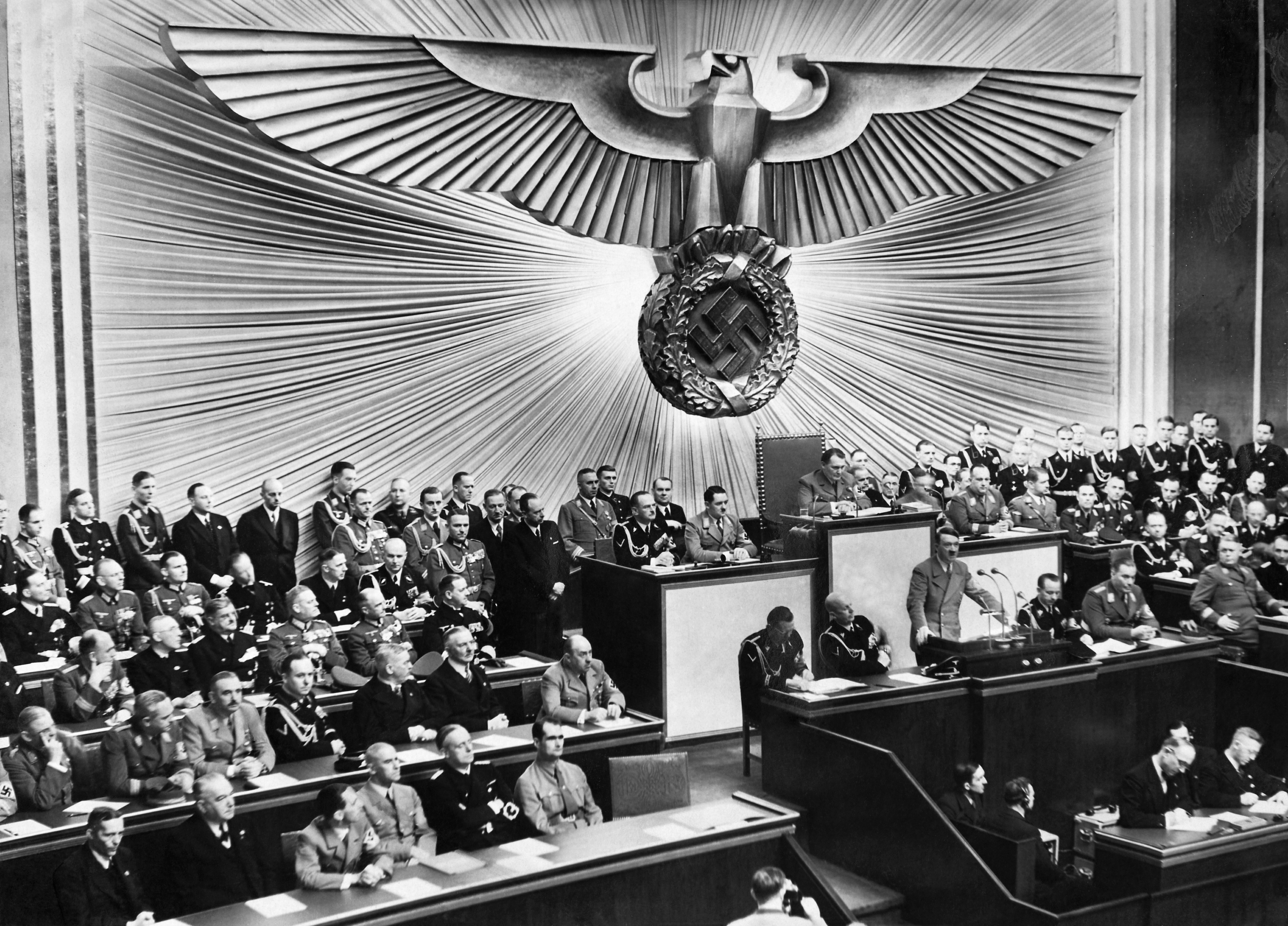
Hitler's prophecy speech in the Reichstag, 30 January 1939, during which he threatened "the annihilation of the Jewish race in Europe"

Most historians take the view that Hitler was the opposite of a pragmatist: his overriding obsession was hatred of the Jews, and he showed on a number of occasions that he was willing to risk losing the war to achieve their destruction. There is no "smoking gun" in the form of a document that shows Hitler ordering the Final Solution. Hitler did not have a bureaucratic mind and many of his most important instructions were given orally. There is ample documentary evidence, however, that Hitler desired to eradicate Jewry and that the order to do so originated from him, including the authorization for mass deportations of the Jews to the east beginning in October 1941. He cannot have imagined that these hundreds of thousands of Jews would be housed, clothed, and fed by the authorities of the Government-General, and in fact Hans Frank frequently complained that he could not cope with the influx.

Historian Paul Johnson writes that some writers, such as David Irving, have claimed that because there were no written orders, "the Final Solution was Himmler's work and [...] Hitler not only did not order it but did not even know it was happening". Johnson states, however, that "this argument will not stand up. The administration of the Third Reich was often chaotic but its central principle was clear enough: all key decisions emanated from Hitler."

According to Kershaw, "Hitler's authority—most probably given as verbal consent to propositions usually put to him by Himmler—stood behind every decision of magnitude and significance." Hitler continued to be closely involved in the "Final Solution". Kershaw also points out that, "in the wake of the German military crisis following the catastrophe at Stalingrad" that "Hitler took a direct hand" in convincing his Hungarian and Romanian allies to "sharpen the persecution" of the Jews. Hitler's role in the Final Solution was often indirect rather than overt, frequently granting approval rather than initiating. The unparalleled outpourings of hatred were a constant even amid all the policy shifts of the Nazis. They often had propaganda or mobilizing motives, and usually remained generalized. Even so, Kershaw remains adamant that Hitler's role was decisive and indispensable in the unfolding of the "Final Solution".

In the following widely cited speech made on 30 January 1939, Hitler gave a speech to the Reichstag which included the statement:

I want to be a prophet again today: if international finance Jewry in Europe and beyond should succeed once more in plunging the peoples into a world war, then the result will be not the Bolshevization of the earth and thus the victory of Jewry, but the annihilation of the Jewish race in Europe.

On 30 January 1942 at the Sports Palace in Berlin, Hitler told the crowd:

And we say that the war will not end as the Jews imagine it will, namely with the uprooting of the Aryans, but the result of this war will be the complete annihilation of the Jews.

According to historian Klaus Hildebrand, moral responsibility for the Holocaust resides with Hitler and was nothing less than the culmination of his pathological hatred of the Jews, which for all intents and purposes formed the basis of Nazi genocide and drove the regime to pursue its racial-eliminationist goals. Whether or not Hitler gave a direct order for the implementation of the Final Solution is immaterial and nothing more than a red herring, which fails to recognize Hitler's leadership style, particularly since his verbal commands were sufficient to launch initiatives—due largely to the fact that his subordinates were always "working towards the Führer" in an effort to implement "his totalitarian vision" even in cases "without written authority." Throughout Gerald Fleming's notable work, Hitler and the Final Solution, he demonstrates that on numerous occasions, Himmler mentioned a "Führer-Order" concerning the annihilation of the Jews, which indicates that at the very least, Hitler verbally issued a command on the subject.

Journal entries from Propaganda Minister Joseph Goebbels support the position that Hitler was the driving force behind the destruction of the Jews as well; Goebbels wrote that Hitler followed the subject closely and described the Führer as "uncompromising" about eliminating the Jews. As historian David Welch asserts, if one takes the scale of the logistical operations that the Holocaust comprised (in the middle of a worldwide war) into consideration alone, it is nearly impossible that the extermination of so many people and the coordination of such an extensive effort could have occurred without Hitler's authorization. Historian Dan Stone echoes these sentiments, writing, "...it is unquestionable that Hitler was the prime mover in the murder of the Jews. The architects of the policy, Himmler and his deputy, Heydrich, were continually attentive to what Hitler wanted and demanded and would have done nothing...without his say-so."

=== Other Nazi leaders ===
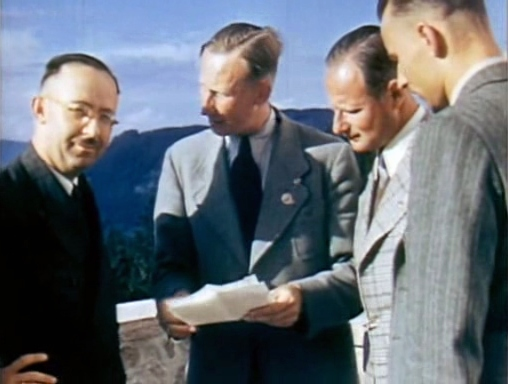
Heinrich Himmler, Reinhard Heydrich and Karl Wolff at the Berghof, May 1939

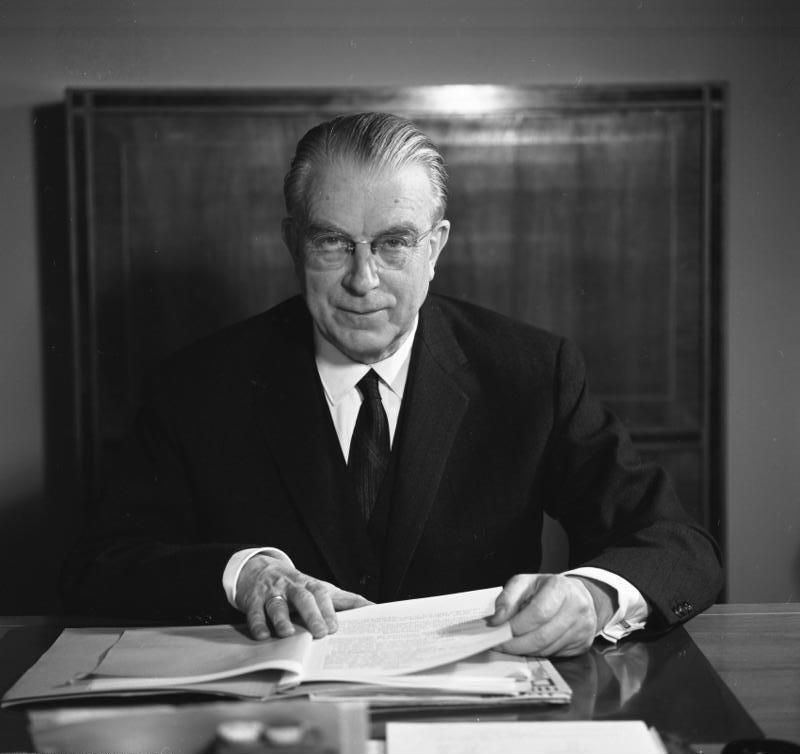
Konrad Adenauer's State Secretary Hans Globke had played a major role in drafting antisemitic Nuremberg Race Laws.

While significant numbers of Germans and other Europeans collectively participated in the Holocaust, it was Hitler and his Nazi followers who share the greatest responsibility for incentivizing, coercing, and/or overseeing the extermination of millions of people. Among those most responsible for the Final Solution were Heinrich Himmler, Reinhard Heydrich, Adolf Eichmann, Odilo Globocnik, Ernst Kaltenbrunner, Ernst Robert Grawitz, Alois Brunner, Otto Ohlendorf, Heinrich Müller, Wilhelm Koppe, Theodor Eicke, Richard Glücks, Friedrich Jeckeln, Friedrich-Wilhelm Krüger, Rudolf Höss, Christian Wirth, Walter Rauff, and Oswald Pohl. Key roles were also played by Fritz Sauckel, Alfred Rosenberg, Erich Koch, Arthur Greiser, Josef Buhler, Hans Frank, Wilhelm Frick and Robert Ley.

Other top Nazi leaders such as Joseph Goebbels, Hermann Göring, and Martin Bormann contributed in various ways, whether administratively supporting killing efforts or providing ideological fodder to encourage the Holocaust. For example, Goebbels carried on an intensive antisemitic propaganda campaign and also had frequent discussions with Hitler about the fate of the Jews. He was aware throughout that the Jews were being exterminated, and completely supported this decision. In July 1941, Göring issued a memo to Heydrich ordering him to organise the practical details of a solution to the "Jewish Question". This led to the Wannsee Conference held on 20 January 1942, where Heydrich formally announced that genocide of the Jews of Europe was now an official Reich policy. That same year, Bormann signed the decree of 9 October 1942 prescribing that the permanent Final Solution in Greater Germany could no longer be solved by emigration, but only by the use of "ruthless force in the special camps of the East", that is, extermination in Nazi death camps.

Although the Nazi regime is often depicted as a super-centralized vertically hierarchical state, individual initiative was an important element in how Nazi Germany functioned. Millions of people were rounded up, bureaucratically processed and transported across Europe due to the vigorous initiative of those Nazis most committed to carrying out their duties to the state, an operation involving thousands of officials and a great deal of paperwork. This was a coordinated effort among the SS and its sprawling police apparatus with the Reich ministries and the national railways, all under the supervision of the Nazi Party. Most of the Party's regional leaders (Gauleiters) also knew of the Holocaust since many were present for Himmler's October 1943 speech at Posen, during which he explicitly mentioned the extermination of the Jews.

=== German military ===
The extent to which the officers of the regular German military knew of the Final Solution has been much debated. Political imperatives in postwar Germany led to the army being generally absolved from responsibility, apart from the handful of "Nazi generals" such as Alfred Jodl and Wilhelm Keitel who were tried and hanged at Nuremberg. There is an abundance of evidence, however, that the top officers of the Wehrmacht certainly knew about the murders and in a number of instances, approved and/or sanctioned them. The exhibit "War of Extermination: The Crimes of the Wehrmacht" (Note: The exhibit was produced by the Hamburg Institute for Social Research) showed the extent to which the military was involved in the Holocaust.

It was particularly difficult for commanders on the eastern front to avoid knowing what was happening in the areas behind the front. Many individual soldiers photographed the massacres of Jews by the Einsatzgruppen. Some generals and officers, such as Walther von Reichenau, Erich Hoepner, and Erich von Manstein, actively supported the work of the Einsatzgruppen. A number of Wehrmacht units provided direct or indirect assistance to the Einsatzgruppen—all the while mentally normalizing amoral behaviors in the conduct of war through specious justification that they were destroying the Reich's enemies. Many individual soldiers who ventured to the killing sites behind the lines voluntarily participated in mass shootings. Cooperation between the SS police units and Wehrmacht also occurred when they took hostages and carried out reprisals against partisans, particularly in the Eastern theater, where the war took on the complexion of a racial war as opposed to the conventional one being fought in the West.

Other front-line officers went through the war without coming into direct contact with the machinery of extermination, choosing to focus narrowly on their duties and not noticing the wider context of the war. On 20 July 1942, an extermination unit under the command of Walther Rauff was sent to Tobruk and assigned to the Afrika Korps led by Erwin Rommel. However, since Rommel was 500 km away at the First Battle of El Alamein, it is unlikely that the two were able to meet. The plans for Einsatzgruppe Egypt were set aside after the Allied victory at the Second Battle of El Alamein. Historian Jean-Christoph Caron opines that there is no evidence that Rommel knew of or would have supported Rauff's mission. Relations between some Army commanders and the SS were not friendly, as officers occasionally refused to co-operate with Himmler's forces; General Johannes Blaskowitz for instance, was relieved of his command after officially protesting about SS atrocities in Poland. (Note: Joachim Fest claims that Stauffenberg and other German officers involved in 20 July 1944 plot to kill Hitler were aware of the Holocaust and felt their oath was dissolved by Nazi crimes. See: Fest, Joachim. Plotting Hitler's Death: The Story of the German Resistance. New York: Henry Holt and Company, 1997.) Such behaviors were uncommon, however, as a significant portion of the German military acculturated to the norms of the Nazi regime and the SS in particular, and were likewise censurable for carrying out atrocities during the course of the Second World War.

=== Across Europe and abroad ===
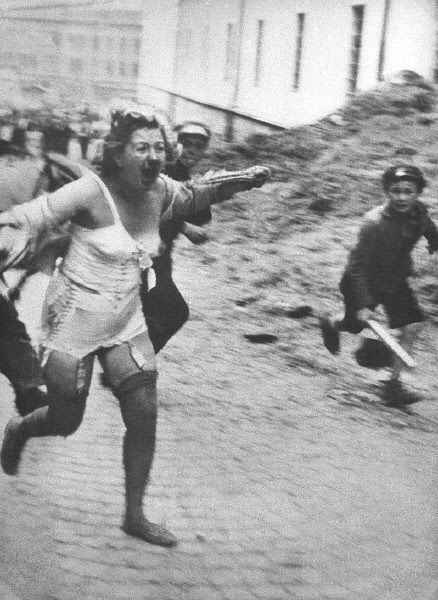
Jewish woman chased by men and youth armed with clubs during the Lviv pogroms, July 1941

Although the Holocaust was planned and directed by Germans, the Nazi regime found willing collaborators in other countries, both those allied to Germany and those under German occupation and by 1942, the atrocities across the continent became a "pan-European program." Historian Dan Stone observed in a recent (2025) academic series:

...as we know more...the notion of the Holocaust as a German project of "industrial genocide" seems ever less tenable. The genocide of the Jews did culminate in the "death factory" of Auschwitz, when the Jews of Hungary were deported in the spring of 1944, but it also included face-to-face killings, committed not only by the SS Einsatzgruppen, but also by collaborationist regimes and opportunist individuals...it included killings undertaken by regimes and groups who were not German...the Holocaust was a continent-wide crime committed by willing participants everywhere, irrespective of whether we look at countries occupied by the Germans or allied to them. The scope of this discovery encompasses the Balkans as well as North Africa, Scandinavia as well as Romania.

Examples abound, such as the civil service and police of the Vichy regime in occupied France, who actively collaborated in persecuting French Jews. Germany's allies, Italy, Finland, Hungary, Romania, and Bulgaria, were all pressured to introduce anti-Jewish measures. Bulgaria refused to co-operate, and all 50,000 Bulgarian Jews survived (though most lost their possessions and many were imprisoned), but thousands of Greek and Yugoslavian Jews were deported from the Bulgarian-occupied territories. Finland officially refused to participate in the Holocaust and only 7 out of 300 Jewish alien refugees were turned over to the Germans. The Hungarian regime of Miklós Horthy also refused to cooperate until the German invasion of Hungary in 1944, after which its 750,000 Jews were no longer safe. Between May through July 1944, upwards of 437,000 Jews were deported from Hungary to Auschwitz. The Romanian regime of Ion Antonescu actively persecuted Jews, murdering some 120,000 of them. The German puppet regime in Croatia actively persecuted Jews on its own initiative.

The Nazis enlisted support for their programs in all the countries they occupied, although their recruitment methods differed in various countries according to Nazi racial theories. In the "Nordic" countries of Denmark, Norway, Netherlands, and Estonia they tried to recruit young men into the Waffen-SS, with sufficient success to create the "Wiking" SS division on the Eastern Front, many of whose members fought for Germany with great fanaticism until the end of the war. In Lithuania and Ukraine, on the other hand, they recruited large numbers of auxiliary troops that were used for anti-partisan work and guard duties at extermination and concentration camps.

In recent years, the extent of local collaboration with the Nazis in Eastern Europe has become more apparent. Historian Alan Bullock writes: "The opening of the archives both in the Soviet Union and in Eastern Europe has produced incontrovertible evidence [of] ... collaboration on a much bigger scale than hitherto realized of Ukrainians and Lithuanians as well as Hungarians, Croats and Slovaks in the deportation and murder of Jews." Historians have been examining the question of whether it is fair to connote the Holocaust as a European Project. Historian Dieter Pohl has estimated that more than 200,000 non-Germans "prepared, carried out and assisted in acts of murder"; that is about the same number as Germans and Austrians. Such numbers have elicited a similar reaction from other historians; Götz Aly for instance, has come to the conclusion that the Holocaust was in fact a "European project." While the Holocaust was perpetrated at the urging of the Nazis and constituted part of the SS vision for a "pan-European racial community", the subsequent outbursts of antisemitic violence in Croatia, France, Romania, Slovakia, the Baltic states among others, make the catastrophe a "European project" according to historian Dan Stone.

==== Albania ====
Albania presents a unique case during the Holocaust. While under Italian and later German occupation, many Albanians sheltered Jews and refused to comply with German demands to surrender them. As a result, Albania's Jewish population increased during the Second World War. However, in areas such as Kosovo and western Macedonia, which were administered by Axis-aligned Greater Albania, local collaboration and persecution did occur. In 1944, over 200 Jews were deported from Kosovo to Bergen-Belsen concentration camp, where the majority of them were murdered. Some that survived had joined resistance groups fighting with the Greek army in the mountains.

==== Belgium ====
In Belgium the state has been accused of having actively collaborated with Nazi Germany. An official 2007 report commissioned by the Belgian senate concluded that the Belgians were indeed complicit in participating in the Holocaust. According to the report, the Belgian authorities "adopted a docile attitude providing collaboration unworthy of a democracy in its treatment of Jews." The report also identified three crucial moments that showed the attitude of Belgian authorities toward the Jews: (1) During the autumn of 1940 when they complied with the order of the German occupier to register all Jews even though it was contrary to the Belgium constitution; this led to a number of measures including the firing of all Jews from official positions in December 1940 and the expelling of all Jewish children from their schools in December 1941; (2) In summer 1942, when over one thousand Jews were deported to the death camps, particularly Auschwitz during the month of August. This was only the first of such actions as the deportations to the east continued resulting in the death of some 25,000 people; and (3) At the end of 1945, the Belgian state officials decided that its authorities bore no legal responsibility for the persecution of the Jews, even though many Belgian police officers participated in the rounding up and deportation of Jews, particularly in the Flemish part of Belgium.

However, collaboration is not the whole story. While there is little doubt that there were strong antisemitic feelings in Belgium, after November 1942, the German roundups became less successful as large-scale rescue operations were carried out by ordinary Belgians. Many bankers, notaries, and judges—people who had access to information about property, accounts, and commercial registers—refused to be complicit in the expropriation of Jewish property, which elicited complaints from Nazi authorities. These actions (among others) resulted in the survival of about 25,000 Jews from Belgium. Unlike other states, which were immediately annexed, Belgium was initially placed under German military administration, which the Belgian authorities exploited by refusing to carry out some of the Nazi directives against the Jews. Roughly 40 percent of Belgium's Jews, who were there at the start of the war, did not survive the Final Solution.

==== Bulgaria ====
Bulgaria, mainly through the influence of the Bulgarian Orthodox Church, saved nearly all of its indigenous Jewish population from deportation and certain death. This is not to imply that Bulgaria was entirely blameless, as they passed special laws to confiscate Jewish property and remove them from public service in early 1941. When this law came into effect on 23 January 1941—signed by Tsar Boris III—Jews were also forbidden from marrying Christians, they could no longer serve in the Bulgarian military, became subject to forced labor, and could no longer vote, nor could they change residence without police authorization. Once civil and military administration over parts of Northern Greece and Macedonia were turned over to Bulgaria by Germany, Bulgarian authorities deported Jews from those territories to concentration camps. Originally SS Captain Theodor Dannecker and the head of the Commissariat for Jewish Affairs, Alexander Belev, agreed to deport as many as 20,000 Jews from Macedonia and Thrace. These deportations were set to be completed by May 1943. Belev had agreed to these measures without the knowledge or approval from officials in the Bulgarian government, which sparked protests that reached the Bulgarian National Assembly in Sofia. Before the matter was over, however, Bulgaria had deported some 11,000 foreign Jews to Nazi-held territory. Once those Jews were handed over to the Germans, they were sent to the extermination camp at Treblinka, where they perished.

==== Channel Islands ====
Channel Islands police collaborated with the Nazis deporting local Jews, some of whom were sent to Auschwitz in 1942, others were deported in 1943 as retaliation for the British commando raid on the small Channel Island of Sark when most of the Jews were shipped to internment camps in France and Germany. On the Channel Island of Alderney a labor camp for Jews was established, one which was notable for the brutality of the German guards; hundreds of Jews were murdered there and 384 were buried within the camp itself, while many others were simply dumped into the sea. Some 250—mostly French—Jews perished on a ship headed from Germany to the Alderney camp when it was sunk by the Royal Navy on 4 July 1944.

==== Croatia ====
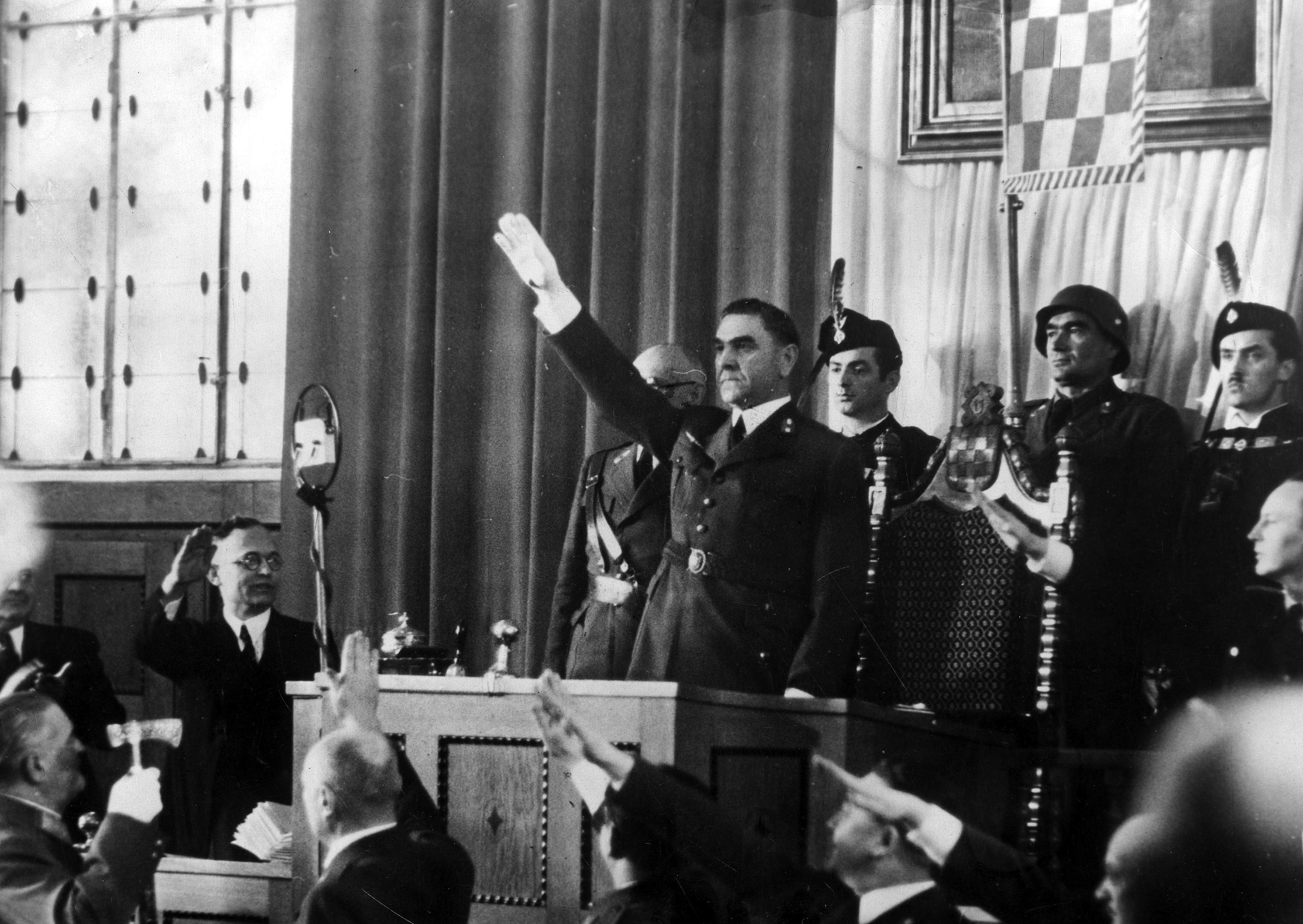
Ante Pavelić greeting the Croatian parliament in February 1943

Croatia was a puppet state which was created by the Germans and ruled by the vehemently racist head of the Ustaše, Ante Pavelić. As early as May 1941, the Croatian government forced all Jews to wear the yellow badge and by the summer of that same year, they enacted laws that excluded them from both the economy and society. Within those first few months in power, the Ustaše also demolished the main synagogue in Zagreb. The Croatian Ustaše regime killed hundreds of thousands of people, primarily Serbs, but also Jews, Roma, and Anti-fascists. Historians Donald Niewyk and Francis Nicosia estimate the number of people killed by the Ustaše using the following ranges: 500,000 Serbs, 25,000 Gypsies, and 32,000 Jews; most of whom (75%) were murdered, not by the Nazis but by the Croatians themselves. Between 45,000 and 52,000 Serbs, about 12,000 to 20,000 Jews and 15,000 to 20,000 Roma, were killed in the Ustaše's Jasenovac concentration camp near Zagreb. Modeled using Nazi examples, the Jasenovac camp has been referenced as the Holocaust's "only non-Nazi extermination center". Croatians murdered of their own volition as part of their own "large-scale political re-population project," one with the obvious goal of ethnic cleansing. (Note: Many Jews fled into neighboring regions while others were deported both during and after the Nazi invasion of Yugoslavia in April 1941. Croats who opposed the Nazi regime were imprisoned in concentration camps. Some Croats risked their lives during the Holocaust in order to save Jews from extermination by the Nazis. See for instance: Croatian Righteous Among the Nations) According to the 2001 census in Croatia, only 495 Jews were listed of the 25,000 Jews who had previously lived there before the Second World War, accounting for less than 0.1% of Croatia's population.

==== Denmark ====
Due in part to the fact that the Germans were dependent upon an "uninterrupted supply of Danish agricultural products to the Reich" they tolerated the status quo of 6,500 Jews living undisturbed in Denmark. Upset with German policies and wishing for democracy, the Danes began demonstrating against the Germans, which incited a military response from the Nazis that included dismantling the Danish military forces and correspondingly placing Danish Jews at increased risk.

Most of the Danish Jews were saved by the unwillingness of the Danish government and people to acquiesce to the demands of the occupying forces and through their concerted efforts to ferry Danish Jews to Sweden during October 1943. In total, this endeavor saved nearly 8,000 Jews from certain death; another 425 who were sent to Theresienstadt (Note: Before the war's end, fifty-one amid the 400-plus Jews at Theresienstadt died at the camp.) were also saved due to the determination of the Danes, and returned to their homes following the war. About 1,500 of the roughly 8,000 Jews rescued by the Danes were recent refugees from Czechoslovakia, Austria, and Germany.

==== Estonia ====
Prior to the Second World War, there were approximately 5,000 Estonian Jews. With the Nazi invasion of the Baltics, the Nazi government found willing volunteers from this region to assist the Einsatzgruppen and auxiliary police, which enabled it to carry out mass genocide in this region. About 50% of Estonia's Jewish population, aware of the fate that otherwise awaited them following the Nazi invasion, managed to escape to the Soviet Union; virtually all those remaining were forced to wear badges identifying them as Jews, stripped of their property, and eventually murdered by Einsatzgruppe A and local collaborators before the end of 1941. Right-wing Estonian units, known as the Omakaitse were among those who aided the Einsatzgruppen in murdering Jews. During the winter of 1941–1942, Einsatzgruppe A operating in Ostland and the Army Group Rear reported having murdered 2,000 Jews in Estonia. At the Wannsee Conference in January 1942, Estonia was reported to be Jew-free. Jews from countries outside the Baltics were shipped there to be exterminated—as was the case for 7,130 Jews sent to Estonia in September 1943, where they were murdered within months. An estimated 20,000 Jews were sent to labor camps in Estonia from elsewhere in Eastern Europe.

==== Finland ====
Despite being at times a co-belligerent of Nazi Germany, Finland remained independent and its leadership flatly refused to cooperate with Heinrich Himmler's request to relinquish its 2,000 Jews. Some Jews were even able to flee German-occupied Europe and make their way into Finland. Only seven of the 300 alien Jews living in Finland were turned over to the Germans. Even the deportation of a handful of Jews did not go unnoticed, as there were protests in Finland from members of its indigenous Social Democratic Party, by a number of Lutheran ministers, the Archbishop, and the Finnish Cabinet. Like Denmark, Finland was one of only two countries in the orbit of Nazi domination that refused to cooperate fully with Hitler's regime. These historical observations do not absolve all Finns, as some scholars point out—in particular, the Einsatzkommando Finnland was formed during the joint invasion of the Soviet Union, which received collaboration from Finnish police units and Finnish military intelligence in capturing partisans, Jews, and Soviet POWs as part of their operations—exactly how many of each group remains unclear and is a subject needing further research according to historian Paul Lubotina.

==== France ====
Antisemitism, as the Dreyfus Affair had shown at the end of the 19th century, was widespread in France, especially among anti-republican sympathizers. Long before the rise of the Nazis, antisemitism was so pronounced in France that, according to intellectual historian George Mosse, France seemed like it would be the country where racism might direct its political future. Before the onset of World War II, there were roughly 350,000 Jews residing in France, with only 150,000 being native-born. Approximately 50,000 were refugees fleeing Germany, Austria, and Czechoslovakia, while another 25,000 came to France from Belgium and Holland; the remaining Jews were arrivals to France in the 1920s and 30s from Eastern Europe.

Once the Germans invaded, many Jews fled away from the advancing forces, but France's rapid collapse, both militarily and politically, the armistice, and the speed at which everything happened trapped many of them in southern France. Philippe Pétain, who became the French premier after Paris had fallen to the German Army, arranged the surrender to Germany. He then became the head of the Vichy government, which collaborated with the Nazis, claiming that it would soften the hardships of occupation. Opposition to the German occupation of northern France and the collaborationist Vichy government was left to the French Resistance within France and the Free French Forces led by Charles de Gaulle outside France. German occupation was quickly accompanied by harsh treatment; Jews were expelled from Alsace-Lorraine and their property was confiscated, whereas foreign Jews—around 32,000—were interned following a Vichy decree on 4 October 1940. Additional discriminatory measures soon followed and intensified after the Nazis issued an ordinance on 27 September 1940; these were carried out by the French administration and included: identification requirements for Jews, a census to account for all Jews and businesses, expropriation and "Aryanization" of property, along with occupational restrictions and bans. On 7 October 1940, Pétain's government repealed the Crémieux Decree, a move which deprived 117,000 Algerian-born French Jews of the civil rights they were granted in 1870.

By the end of 1940, more Jews were arrested in Vichy France than in German-occupied France. Another 1,112 Jews were arrested during French round-ups in May and December 1941; later, when they were deported, they constituted some of the earliest arrivals to Auschwitz at the end of March 1942. Five thousand additional Jews were sent from France to Auschwitz at the end of April and during June 1942. The chief of police for the Vichy government, René Bousquet, agreed to arrest foreign and stateless Jews in Vichy France starting in July 1942, and he acceded to having French police collaborate in arresting Jews in the occupied zone. Per agreement between the Vichy government and the Nazis, another 10,000 Jews were added to the total being deported between 19 July and 7 August 1942. Some 2,000 Jewish children whose parents had already been shipped to Auschwitz were also sent to the camp during the period 17–26 August 1942, and by the end of the year, the total figure of deportees from France reached 42,000 persons. From the first transport of March 1942 to the last one during July 1944, as many as 77,911 Jews were deported from France to Poland. (Note: According to historian Yehuda Bauer, the Vichy government was profoundly complicit in the Holocaust; he cites the example of the Vel' d'Hiv Roundup of 16 and 17 July 1942, in which 12,884 Jewish men, women, and children were arrested, including some 4,000 small children who were previously roaming the streets of Paris. They were held at the Winter Velodrome and Drancy transit camp under harsh conditions, and nearly all were eventually transported by rail to Auschwitz.) Most of the Jews in France were transported to Auschwitz, but some were sent to Majdanek and Sobibór with a few ending up at Buchenwald.

==== Greece ====
The Jews of Greece mainly lived in the area around Thessaloniki, where a large and influential Sephardi community had lived since the 15th century, where some 55,000 Jews comprised nearly 20% of the city. Following the German invasion and occupation of Salonika in 1941, an antisemitic nationalist party called National Union of Greece (Ethniki Enosis Ellados, EEE), which had existed between 1927 and 1935, was revived by Nazi authorities. (Note: Members of the EEE assisted the occupying forces in identifying Jews and collaborated on the deportation of local Jews with remarkable efficiency, either for ethnic hatred or for more prosaic reasons such as obtaining profits from the confiscation and sale of Jewish property. By the time of the German withdrawal from Greece in 1944, nearly 90% of the Jewish community in Thessaloniki had been annihilated.)

The Greek governor, Vasilis Simonides, cooperated with the Nazi authorities and supplied local police forces to aide in deporting 48,500 Jews from Salonika to Auschwitz-Birkenau during March to August 1943. Both Greeks and Germans looted the businesses and homes vacated by the expelled Jews. Greek Jews residing in the areas occupied by Bulgaria were also deported following the deportations from Salonika. In March 1944, German forces and Greek police in Athens rounded up Jews and deported them. Upwards of 2,000 Jews from Corfu and another 2,200 from Rhodes were transported to concentration camps in June 1944. Before the end of the war, over 60,000 Greek Jews were murdered, the vast majority of whom were sent to Auschwitz.

==== Hungary ====
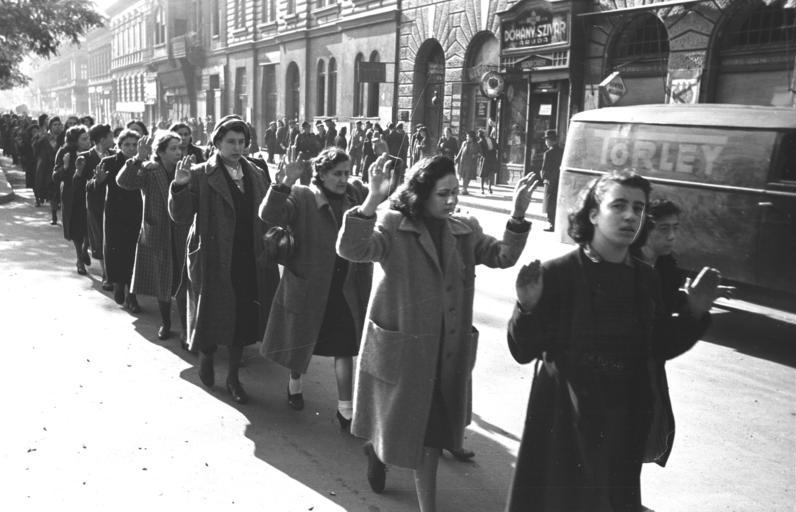
Captured Jewish women in Wesselényi Street, Budapest, Hungary on 20–22 October 1944

In March 1938, several years before the German occupation of Hungary, anti-Jewish measures were already enacted by the Hungarian Parliament in the wake of Prime Minister Kálmán Darányi's announcement about the need to solve the Jewish question. This legislation and the second set of anti-Jewish laws restricted Jews from certain professions and economic sectors, it also forbade Jews from becoming Hungarian citizens by means of either marriage, naturalization, or legitimization. Approximately 90,000 Jews and their family members who relied on their support (upwards of 220,000 people) lost their means of economic survival and when the third anti-Jewish law went into effect, it nearly mirrored the Nazi Nuremberg Laws.

Once the legal exclusion of Jews from Hungarian society was complete, the National Central Alien Control Office (Külföldieket Ellenőrző Országos Központi Hatóság, KEOKH), turned its attention almost exclusively to expelling "undesirable" Jews. By the summer of 1941, the Hungarians carried out their first series of mass murders, and again in early January 1942, when they slaughtered 2,500 Serbs and 700 Jews, demonstrating that the political leadership in Hungary authorized the commission of atrocities even before the German occupation. Sometime in August 1941, the Hungarian authorities deported 16,000 "alien" Jews, most of whom were shot by the SS and Ukrainian collaborators. In the spring of 1942, the Hungarian Minister of Defense ordered the majority of Jewish forced labor to the theater of military operations. Due to this order, as many as 50,000 Jews worked in military forced-labor companies starting in the spring of 1942 through 1944. Accompanying Hungarian troops during Operation Barbarossa, Jews in these units were poorly treated, insufficiently housed, ill-fed, routinely used to clear minefields, and placed in constant unnecessary danger; estimates indicate that "at least 33,000 Hungarian Jewish males in the prime of life" died in Russia.

During parts of May through June 1944, some 10,000 Hungarian Jews were gassed on a daily basis at Auschwitz-Birkenau, a pace with which the crematoria could not keep up, resulting in many of the bodies being burned in open pits. The 410,000 Jews murdered during this period represents the "largest single group of Jews murdered after 1942" according to historian Christian Gerlach. Much of the efficiency with which the Germans were able to deport and murder Hungarian Jews stemmed from the "frictionless cooperation of Hungary's politicians, bureaucracy, and gendarmerie", and popular Hungarian antisemitism served to block any Jews trying to escape. After the fascist Arrow Cross coup in October 1944, Arrow Cross militias shot as many as 20,000 Jews in Budapest and dumped their bodies into the Danube River between December 1944 and the end of January 1945. Jews in labor battalions were sent on death marches into Germany and Austria.

Nearly one-tenth of the Holocaust's Jewish victims were Hungarian Jews, accounting for a total of over 564,000 deaths; some 64,000 Jews had already been murdered prior to the German occupation of Hungary. Despite the atrocities in Hungary, approximately 200,000 Jews in total survived the war.

==== Italy ====
Among Germany's allies, Italy was not known for its antisemitism and had a relatively well-assimilated Jewish population; its policies were essentially about domination as opposed to "destruction." National pride and the need to express sovereignty had as much to do with Italian behaviors as did any general benevolence towards the Jews. Approximately 57,000 Jews resided in pre-war Italy, about 10,000 of whom were refugees from Austria and Germany, comprising less than one-tenth of one percent of the population. An Italian law was passed in 1938 as part of Mussolini's effort to align his country more with Germany; the law restricted civil liberties of Jews. This effectively reduced the country's Jews to second-class status, though the Italians never made it official policy to deport Jews to concentration camps. Edging closer towards Germany, the Italian Ministry of the Interior established 43 camps where enemy "aliens" (to include Jews) were detained—these camps were not pleasant but they were "a far cry from the Nazi concentration camps."

After the fall of Benito Mussolini and the Italian Social Republic, Jews started being deported to German camps by the Italian puppet regime, which issued a police order to that effect on 30 November 1943. While Jews fled once the puppet regime came to power, the Italian police nonetheless captured and sent over 7,000 Jews to camps at Fossoli di Carpi and Bolzano, both of which served as assembly points for deportations to Auschwitz-Birkenau. Italian prisons were used to house Jews as well, the most infamous of them was San Vittore Prison in Milan where "torture and murder were common." Nazi Germany's Propaganda Minister, Joseph Goebbels, complained throughout the war about Italy's "lax" policies against the Jews. Nevertheless, through 1944, no less than 15 transports carrying around 3,800 Jews made their way from Italy to Auschwitz. Estimates from a number of sources place the total death count for Italian Jews between 6,500 and 9,000. The generally accepted death tolls for Italy are about 8,000 Jews and as many as 1,000 Roma.

==== Latvia ====
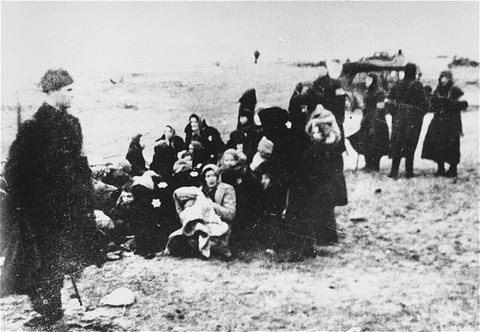
Members of a Latvian self-defence unit assemble a group of Jewish women for execution on a beach near Liepāja, 15 December 1941.

Before the war over 93,000 Jews resided in Latvia, comprising less than 5 percent of the country's population. Immediately in the wake of the German attack on the former Soviet Union in June 1941, Latvia was occupied and incorporated into the Reichskommissariat Ostland as Generalbezirk Lettland with a Latvian civil administration under the D. Heinrich Drechsler. Latvian auxiliary forces aided the SS Einsatzgruppen by following behind the advancing German forces, shooting Jews who they lined up in anti-tank trenches. Other instances of Latvian brutality against the Jews manifested before troops even arrived, as the local populations attacked and murdered entire communities across hundreds of small villages. Zealous Latvians assisted the German forces in collecting all males between the ages of 16 and 60 in the city of Dvinsk for support operations; hundreds of Jewish males never returned from these duties as they were often murdered. In the areas in and around Warsaw, Latvian guards accompanied the SS in securing the ghetto and deporting Jews to Treblinka.

The former head of the Latvian police, Viktors Arājs, willingly collaborated with the Nazis by forming the Arājs Kommando, a Latvian volunteer police unit, which worked closely with the SS Einsatzgruppe A to murder Jews. As early as July 1941, they were already burning synagogues in Riga. According to historian Timothy Snyder, the Arājs Kommando shot 22,000 Latvian Jews at various locations after they had been brutally rounded up for this purpose by the regular police and auxiliaries, and were responsible for assisting in the murder of some 28,000 more Jews. Aggregate figures indicate that around 70,000 Latvian Jews were murdered during the Holocaust.

==== Liechtenstein ====
Only a handful of Jews lived in the small neutral state of Liechtenstein at the outbreak of the Second World War. (Note: According to a U.S. State Dept. report from 2012, there were only 26 Jews residing in Liechtenstein.) Between 1933 and 1945, approximately 400 Jews were taken in by Liechtenstein, but another 165 were turned away. According to a 2005 study, the royal family of Liechtenstein purchased once Jewish-owned property and furniture that the Nazis seized after annexing Austria and Czechoslovakia. Liechtenstein's royal family also rented inmates from Strasshof an der Nordbahn concentration camp near Vienna, where they employed forced labor on nearby royal estates.

==== Lithuania ====
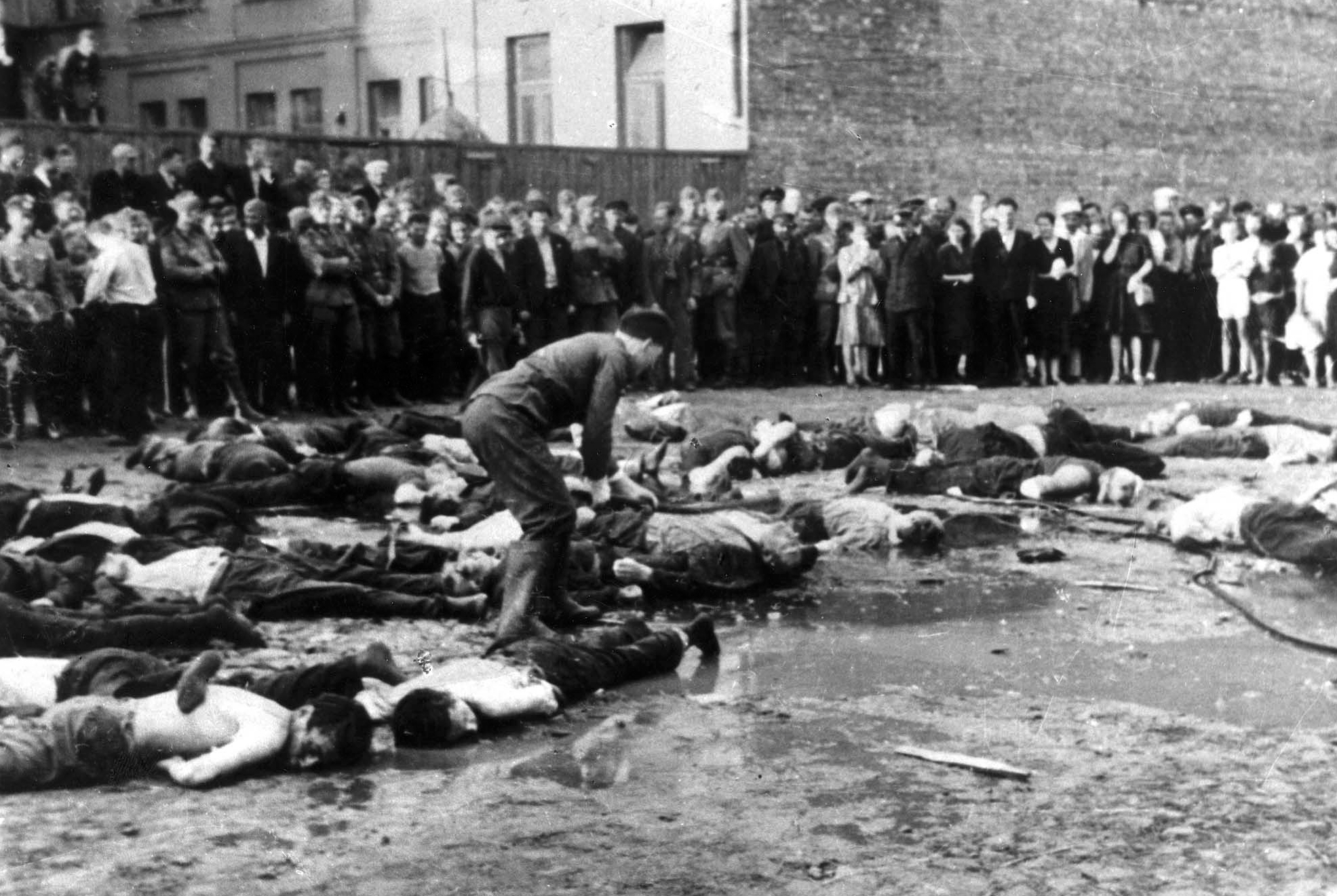
Kaunas pogrom in German-occupied Lithuania, June 1941

Nearly 7 percent of Lithuania's population was Jewish, totaling approximately 160,000 persons. For the most part, the Nazis considered the majority of non-Jewish people in the Baltics as racially assimilable with the exception of Jews, against whom some discrimination was already present in Lithuania before the occupation, but it was generally confined to edicts against Jews being in certain occupations and/or educational discrimination. Lithuania's Jewish population quickly swelled in the aftermath of the territorial arrangement between Nazi Germany and the Soviet Union, which proved a tumultuous time for many Jews who fled there to escape persecution; meanwhile, it increased the Jewish population of Lithuania to approximately 250,000. Angry about the Nazi-Soviet pact, many Lithuanians began taking their anger out on the country's Jews by attacking them and their property. The situation deteriorated further due to the see-saw of political power that started when the Soviet Army took control of Lithuania in June 1940 and persecuted thousands of its citizens through a program of Sovietization (approximately 17,000 Lithuanians were sent to Siberia right before the Germans arrived). Many Jews were asked to join the short-lived Soviet government and were allowed integration into Lithuanian society. Just seven weeks later, however, the Nazis invaded and were greeted as liberators. Subsequent blame for the ill fortune that befell the Lithuanians under the Soviets landed on the Jews, which started even before the Germans had finished conquering the country; Lithuanians carried out pogroms in at least 40 different places, where Jews were raped, severely injured, and murdered. Blaming the Jews also afforded the many Lithuanians who had cooperated with the Soviets the means to exonerate themselves by diverting attention onto a Jewish conspiratorial scapegoat.

On 25 June 1941 Nazi forces arrived in Kaunas, where they witnessed local Lithuanians drag about 50 male Jews into the center of the city while one Lithuanian man beat them to death with a crowbar (cheered on by spectators) in a public display of brutality that shocked many Germans. After murdering all the Jews, the man climbed atop their corpses and played the Lithuanian national anthem on an accordion. These deaths were part of the Kaunas pogrom during which many thousands of Jews were murdered by the Nazis with local acquiescence or assistance. Mere weeks after arrival, the Nazis instituted a systematic campaign to eliminate the Jews of Lithuania by identifying them, rounding them up, guarding them, and transporting them to extermination sites—during which they were aided by Lithuanian soldiers and police. The pace of murder increased and spread across Lithuania as the Germans consolidated their rule, sometimes by way of Lithuanian initiative, other times triggered at the arrival of Sipo-SD contingents. Within the last six months of 1941 following the June invasion by Germany, the majority of Lithuanian Jews were executed, the biggest crime being the Ponary massacre. The remnants trapped in ghettos were killed in occupied Lithuania and sent to Nazi death camps in Poland. By the end of June 1941, around 80 percent of Lithuania's Jews had been "wiped out." Scholars believe the overall Holocaust-related death rate in Lithuania was approximately 90 percent, making Nazi-occupied Lithuania the European territory with the lowest proportion of Jewish survivors from World War II. While estimates vary, the number of Lithuanian Jews murdered in the Holocaust is assessed to be between 195,000 and 196,000.

Additionally, Lithuanian auxiliary police troops assisted in murdering Jews in Poland, Belarus and Ukraine. Historian Laurence Rees describes the motivations for Lithuanians' slaughter of their Jewish countrymen. He first cites a prominent Lithuanian historian, who lists five motivations: antisemitism, revenge for alleged collaboration with the Soviet occupation, a desire to show loyalty to the new Nazi occupiers, and greed. Rees adds that sadism must also be included given his interviews with unrepentant perpetrators.

==== Luxembourg ====
Luxembourg was annexed into Nazi Germany in 1940. The local Jewish population, numbering around 3,500, faced increasing restrictions, expropriations, and forced emigration. In October 1941, mass deportations began, mainly to ghettos and death camps in the East. Among the approximately 1,200 Jews deported, more than half of them were murdered. Most of the Jews transported from Luxembourg were killed either at Auschwitz-Birkenau or the Chełmno extermination camp.

==== Netherlands ====
Known prior to the war for racial and religious tolerance, the Netherlands had taken in Jews since the 16th century, many of whom had found refuge there after fleeing Spain. Before the German invasion of May 1940, approximately 140,000 Jews resided in the Netherlands, around 30,000 of them were refugees from Austria and Germany. Nearly 60 percent of Dutch Jews lived in Amsterdam, constituting some 80,000 people. Once the Nazis invaded, a host of antisemitic measures were enacted to include exclusion from professions like the civil service. Anti-Jewish legislation that had taken years to institute in Germany was enacted within just months in the Netherlands. On 22 October 1940, all Jewish banks and businesses had to register and all assets, whether private or those in banks, had to be declared. Even radio sets in possession of Jews were forbidden and confiscated. By January 1941, the Jews of the Netherlands were being defined by racist criteria, had to be registered, and merely a month later in February, many were being deported to Westerbork transit camp in the eastern part of the country. From there, most Dutch Jews were first sent to Mauthausen concentration camp. While there was participation from some Dutch volunteers in various acts against the Jews, there was more of a tacit and begrudging acquiesance in the Netherlands, which required a very visible Nazi presence throughout the entire war to exploit the country's economic wealth and enforce Nazi occupation policies. (Note: According to Holocaust scholar Raul Hilberg—unlike Poland, where persecution of the Jews was openly carried out, the Nazis had to pay close attention to public opinion in the Netherlands.)

From the summer of 1942 forward, upwards of 102,000 Dutch Jews were deported and murdered—much of which was made possible by the "cooperation and efficiency of the Dutch civil service and police" who willingly served the Germans. Not only was there relatively smooth cooperation between Dutch authorities and Dutch police, the SS and the Nazi police organizations in the Netherlands also worked well together there; additionally, volunteers from indigenous fascist organizations assisted in persecuting Jews, and the Jewish council in Amsterdam, unfortunately, spread undue optimism and as a result, very few Dutch Jews went into hiding. In all fairness to the Jewish council, however, they were deceived and provided misinformation by the Nazi commissioner for Amsterdam, Hans Böhmcker. Historians Deborah Dwork and Robert Jan van Pelt report that in the Netherlands, nearly 80% of the 140,000 Jews originally living there were murdered. (Note: The 80% figure is also substantiated in The Holocaust Encyclopedia, edited by Walter Laqueur and Judith T. Baumel.) (Note: Additional reasons that have been suggested to explain the high percentages of Jews murdered in the Netherlands range from: the occupation regime in the Netherlands was formed by fanatical Austrian Nazis; the typical Dutch landscape without mountains or woods made it practically impossible to find shelter; the majority of the Dutch Jews lived in the larger cities and thus they formed relatively easy targets for persecution and segregation; the Jewish leaders chose, "in order to prevent worse", a policy of collaboration with the Nazis. See: Ad van Liempt, A Price on Their Heads, Kopgeld, Dutch bounty hunters in search of Jews, 1943)

==== North Africa ====
The Holocaust's reach into North Africa unfolded through overlapping colonial-fascist apparatuses enacted by Italy and Vichy France alike, both of whose anti-Jewish policies were neither simple extensions of German mandates nor simply incidental to the broader genocidal project; these measures included "the expropriation of property" as well as "economic disenfranchisement," and both "internment and forced labor." Vichy France's camp network across North Africa—extending from Algeria and Morocco through the Saharan interior and into French West Africa—was administered through a deliberately stratified labor apparatus, organized into Groupements de Travailleurs Étrangers and related worker classifications, whose inmate population comprised foreign Jews, Spanish Republicans, political dissidents, and demobilized soldiers subjected to forced labor on projects including the colonial-era Mediterranean-Niger railway; in Algeria alone, an estimated 2,000–3,000 Jews were interned alongside political prisoners of various nationalities, producing a total prisoner population of between 15,000 and 20,000. Critically, these camps were not dissolved following Operation Torch in November 1942—the Allied landings that effectively ended Vichy authority in Morocco and Algeria—and many internees remained imprisoned for months or years thereafter. Historians Aomar Boum and Sarah Abrevaya Stein claim the cause of the camps continued existence lay not in German pressure but in the self-sustaining momentum of the French colonial administration itself.

Concomitantly, German responsibility in North Africa was structural and enabling rather than initiating in disposition: General Rommel's deployment to Libya from March 1941 created an operational context in which the Italian colonial police (PAI) could assume German approval for anti-Jewish measures. Correspondingly, SS officers cooperated directly with the PAI and camp survivors at Giado concentration camp reported Germans as direct supervisors to the PAI officers. During the summer of 1942, Germany pressured Italy to deport all Libyan Jews to Europe, and when Italy capitulated in September 1943, British-nationality Libyan Jews held in Italian internment camps fell into German hands and were transferred to the Bergen-Belsen concentration camp. In Tunisia, where Germany occupied the protectorate from November 1942 to May 1943, the Nazi military command largely relied on the existing Vichy apparatus rather than displacing it, though General von Arnim issued a December 1942 collective-punishment order requiring Tunisian Jews to pay twenty million francs for Allied bombing of non-Jewish property.

Across North Africa, Muslim complicity was circumscribed and contested: some Moroccan litigants exploited the anti-Jewish legal climate to recover debts and land; whereas Arab nationalist groups in Libya (following anti-Jewish riots in Cairo, Egypt) carried out pogroms in November 1945—killing between 129 and 135 Jews across Tripolitania—though leading Algerian nationalists explicitly condemned Vichy antisemitism. Meanwhile, Muslim relations with Jews across rural Morocco "remained positive" throughout the war years. (Note: Leading political figures within the Muslim world similarly understood that supporting Vichy antisemitic and European racial supremacist ideology "would not be accompanied by the advancement of Muslim political rights".)

==== Norway ====
Amid a prewar population of 3 million, there were only 2,100 Jews living there, the largest contingency residing in Oslo. After Norway was invaded, the Nazis took control of the government by June 1940 and the native government went into exile. Power was given to the German Reichskommissar Josef Terboven and the Norwegian Fascist Party leader Vidkun Quisling, who supported the institution of anti-Jewish legislation. Quisling attempted to establish himself as the ruler of occupied Norway, but the Nazis only used him as leader of a puppet government. Like in Denmark, radios were confiscated from Jews by Norwegian police in May 1940. On 20 April 1940, SS Einsatzkommandos were established in Oslo, Bergen, Stavanger, Kristiansand, and Trondheim. The Nazis, assisted by Norwegian police units, managed to round up 763 Jews, who were deported to Auschwitz where they were murdered. Another 930 Jews escaped to Sweden from Norway. However, the Nazis and their collaborators were very unpopular in Norway and many Jews were saved by the actions of Norwegians, including civil servants and police officers. Quisling and other Norwegians, who collaborated with the Nazis, were executed as traitors after the war, at least partly due to their involvement in the Holocaust.

==== Palestine ====
Sometime in 1937, when the Nazi regime was considering the forced migration of Germany's Jews (and secretly those across Europe writ-large), Palestinian Arab nationalist and Muslim religious leader, the Grand Mufti of Jerusalem Haj Amin al-Husseini told Hitler that if he wanted to remain allied to the Arabs, he "must close Europe's exit to Jews" so as to prevent their immigration into Palestine. Simultaneously, al-Husseini told the British officials that to prevent Arabs and Muslims from being Britain's "enemies" they must likewise "close entrance to Palestine" for their Jewish population. Meanwhile, al-Husseini also urged "all Muslims to rid their lands of Jews."

After the suppressed Great Palestinian Revolt in British-controlled Palestine, al-Husseini worked for Nazi Germany as a propagandist and a recruiter of Muslim volunteers for the Waffen-SS and other units. In a letter from January 1941, al-Husseini asked Hitler to "help solve the Jewish question" in the Arab lands, akin to what "was being done in Germany." On 28 November 1941, Hitler officially received al-Husseini in Berlin. Hitler spoke of the Germans' "uncompromising fight against the Jews", which included the Jews in Arab territories; after the meeting, the two "agreed to cooperate in committing genocide against the Jews." The Mufti spent the remainder of the war assisting with the formation of Muslim Waffen-SS units in the Balkans and the formation of schools and training centers for imams and mullahs who would accompany the Muslim SS and Wehrmacht units. Beginning in 1943, al-Husseini was involved in the organization and recruitment of Bosnian Muslims into several divisions, the largest of which was the 13th "Handschar" division, a unit known for its combat brutality and savagery but also for committing atrocities against Jewish civilians.

==== Poland ====
Polish Jews comprised roughly 10 percent of the country's population at upwards of 3.3 million persons before the Second World War began, most of whom were well-integrated into Polish society in various industries. Most Polish Jews lived in the cities and were self-employed. Economic depression during the 1920s and 30s changed the situation for Jews in Poland, as a subsequent emergence of antisemitism yielded government programs to reduce their economic standing. German occupation in 1939 only worsened matters for the Jews, as they started isolating them by forcing them into ghettos, eventually transporting them to camps established in Poland itself.

Far right-wing party members in Poland saw the deportation of the Jews in a favorable light, but for the majority of Poles, their thoughts on the matter were far more complex. When the Nazis attacked the Red Army in Soviet-occupied Poland during Operation Barbarossa of 1941, witnesses recalled a series of massacres committed against Jews by the Polish locals in the Białystok and Łomża areas, such as in Jedwabne, Radziłów, and Kolno villages, along with several others in the area. The extent of local collaboration in these massacres is a controversial issue, as is the role of German units present there. Historian Peter Longerich points out that "even if the pogroms can be attributed in large part to German plans to spark off 'attempts at self-cleansing', it has to be admitted that they would not have been possible if there had not already been a significant potential for anti-Semitic violence in the indigenous population and if they had not been susceptible to mobilization for such murderous campaigns." This is also true of Jedwabne, "[which] was engineered by a unit of the German Security Police... [which] had recruited local Poles as auxiliary 'pogrom police' for this purpose." According to Timothy Snyder, there were about a dozen pogroms instigated by the Nazis' arrival in Poland, resulting in several thousand deaths, but "the scale of the murder was...inferior to what the Germans were already achieving to the north and east."

There were multiple occurrences of individual Volksdeutsche turning in, chasing down, or blackmailing Jews; such people were condemned as collaborators and under threat of execution by the Polish resistance. Emmanuel Ringelblum wrote that he saw Polish Blue Police beating Jews and that they participated in street round-ups. But according to Raul Hilberg, "Of all the native police forces in occupied Eastern Europe, those of Poland were least involved in anti-Jewish actions... They [the Polish Blue Police] could not join the Germans in major operations against Jews or Polish resistors, lest they be considered traitors by virtually every Polish onlooker." Poland never surrendered to the Germans so there was no collaboration on a national governmental level as took place elsewhere in occupied Europe. There also were no Polish SS battalions, though there were SS volunteer battalions from almost all of the other German-occupied countries. Attempts to organize Polish SS battalions resulted in immediate, large-scale desertions, and so these attempts were abandoned. Polish Jew, Nechama Tec, an expert on the Holocaust who herself was saved by Polish Catholics, writes that she knew of no Polish concentration camp guards. In general the machinery of the Holocaust ran with little Polish collaboration, though collaboration did take place on occasion as Yisrael Gutman and Shmuel Krakowski reported in their work Unequal Victims that a notable number of Poles turned their backs on the Jews, extorted them (see Szmalcownik ), and in the rural parts of Poland, peasants joined the Germans in hunting down and killing Jews who escaped from ghettos. They also claim that there were more bystander crimes than those willing to aide the Jews. Nonetheless, Polish citizens have the world's highest count of individuals recognized as Righteous Among the Nations by Yad Vashem; a list consisting of Gentiles who risked their lives to save Jews from extermination during the Holocaust.

Nonetheless, due to its European centrality, available rail networks, and proximity to Nazi avenues of control, Poland was the nation where German persecution policies against the Jews were played out in full. German-occupied Poland had the most ghettos, the only camps designed exclusively for extermination, and trains from all across northern, southern, and western Europe carried Jewish deportees into the country. There were over 450 extermination, concentration, labor, and prisoner-of-war camps in Poland. It was also the nation where the infamous killing centers of Belzec, Chelmno, Sobibor, Treblinka, Majdanek, and Auschwitz-Birkenau were located. Before the killing came to its conclusion, upwards of ninety percent of all Poland's Jews—amounting to some three-million persons in total—were murdered by the Nazis.

==== Romania ====
Assimilation was common for Jews in Romania, where some 757,000 of them lived but not necessarily in total peace there. Following the First World War, attacks against Jews intensified, as many Jews were stripped of citizenship. According to historian Lucy Dawidowicz, economic discrimination as well as violent antisemitism was present in Romania concomitant with Germany. Similar to Germany, Jews were forbidden full participation in Romanian society and culture, and under Antonescu the Romanianization of Jewish property was carried out, Jews were forbidden gainful employment, made to work as forced laborers, and a process of ghettoization and deportation was begun. Leading figures in Romania's antisemitic movement included the economics professor, A. C. Cuza, who founded the fascist League of National Christian Defense, an organization that begat the notorious Iron Guard under Corneliu Zelea Codreanu. Cuza wanted to expel all Jews out of Romania; poet Octavian Goga wished to send them to Madagascar. The antisemite Alexandru Resmeriță advocated imprisoning the Jews in concentration camps and working them to death, while a Romanian Orthodox priest suggested drowning them all in the Black Sea. Copying the Nazis, the Romanian government enacted its version of the Nuremberg Laws in 1940. Iron Guard leader Codreanu once exclaimed that he was in favor of "eliminating the Jews completely, totally and without exception." (Note: Members of Codreanu's Iron Guard killed 120 Jews on 19–20 January 1941 and hung their bodies like cattle carcasses at a slaughterhouse in Bucharest.)

The Romanian Antonescu regime was responsible for the deaths of approximately 380,000 Jews according to historian Yehuda Bauer. An official declaration by the Romanian government that denied the existence of the Holocaust within the country's borders during World War II led in 2003 to the creation of the International Commission on the Holocaust in Romania. The official report of the Commission released jointly with the Romanian government concluded:

The Commission concludes, together with the large majority of bona fide researchers in this field, that the Romanian authorities were the main perpetrators of this Holocaust, in both its planning and implementation. This encompasses the systematic deportation and extermination of nearly all the Jews of Bessarabia and Bukovina as well some Jews from other parts of Romania to Transnistria, the mass killings of Romanian and local Jews in Transnistria, the massive execution of Jews during the Iasi pogrom; the systematic discrimination and degradation applied to Romanian Jews during the Antonescu administration—including the expropriation of assets, dismissal from jobs, the forced evacuation from rural areas and concentration in district capitals and camps, and the massive utilization of Jews as forced laborers under the same administration. Jews were degraded solely on account of their Jewish origin, losing the protection of the state and becoming its victims. A portion of the Roma population of Romania was also subjected to deportation and death in Transnistria. (Note: See the official report here: https://www.ushmm.org/m/pdfs/20080226-romania-commission-holocaust-history.pdf)

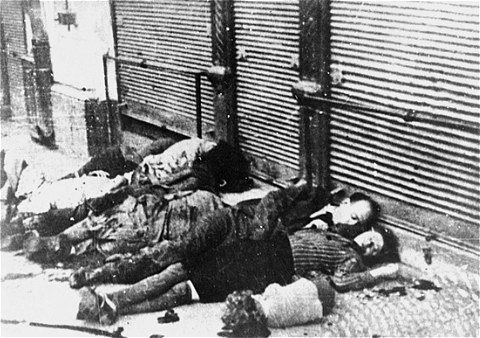
Iași pogrom in Romania, June 1941

In cooperation with German Einsatzgruppen and Ukrainian auxiliaries, Romanian troops murdered hundreds of thousands of Jews in Bessarabia, northern Bukovina, and Transnistria; some of the larger massacres of Jews occurred at Bogdanovka, a Romanian concentration camp along the Bug River in Transnistria, between 21 and 30 December 1941. Nearly 100,000 Jews were murdered in occupied Odessa and well over 10,000 were murdered in the Iași pogrom of June 1941. Romanian troops also massacred Jews in the Domanevka and Akhmetchetka concentration camps. (Note: Also see: Golbert, Rebecca L. "Holocaust Sites in Ukraine: Pechora and the Politics of Memorialization." Holocaust and Genocide Studies 18, no. 2 (2004): 205–233, ISSN 1476-7937)

Jean Ancel, who headed the commission along with Elie Wiesel, spent his entire life researching Romania's treatment of Jews. In his book, he provides a confirmation using Romania's own archives, made available in 1994–95 after the collapse of the Soviet Union, and with Nazi documents, survivor testimonies, war crimes trial transcripts, that Romania not only participated in but independently implemented its own autonomous genocide of Jews in Bessarabia, Bukovina, and in Ukraine—the only Nazi ally to do so during the war.

The protests of various public, political and religious figures, including Prince Constantin Karadja, against the deportation of the Jews from the Romanian Kingdom contributed to the change of policy toward the Jews starting with October 1942. The result of this change of policy and that of the actions of a relatively small number of individuals, was that at least 290,000 Romanian Jews survived.

==== Serbia ====
Before the First World War, Serbia existed as an independent country before being incorporated into Yugoslavia in 1919. Approximately 16,000 Jews resided there. During the interwar years, Serbia constituted one of the places where it was comparatively safe to be a Jew, despite the presence of some general xenophobia. Serbia was occupied by Germany in April 1941. As part of their effort to occupy the northern regions of Yugoslavia, the Germans established a military government in Serbia. Serbia's collaborationist government was led by General Milan Nedić. The internal affairs of the Serbian-occupied territory were moderated by German racial laws, that were introduced in all occupied territories with immediate effects on the Jewish and Roma populations. Indigenous Serbians who harbored democratic beliefs were also targeted. Partisan activities in Serbia elicited harsh pacification measures from the SD and Wehrmacht. (Note: Retribution against the Jews was especially severe in Serbia, partly from the fact that the German forces encountered serious resistance there earlier than they had in the Soviet Union and took from the experience, lessons for future operations.) The Nazis had a collective punishment policy of killing 100 Serbs for each German soldier killed and another 50 Serbs for every German soldier who was wounded. Resistance activities continued for some time in Serbia nonetheless.

Sometimes the Serbian authorities cooperated with the Germans as matter of course, whereas others took the individual initiative; some Serbian military commanders rounded up Gypsies so they could be concentrated in one area, where they were shot. German occupiers declared Serbia Judenfrei in August 1942. The major concentration camps in Serbia were Sajmište and Banjica but many others like Topovske Šupe, Šabac, and Niš concentration camps also interned considerable numbers of Jews. Before the war was concluded, upwards of 14,500 Serbian Jews were murdered. Legends about Serbs saving the Jews in World War II are widespread in Serbia, and 132 Serbs have been honored as Righteous Among the Nations.

==== Slovakia ====
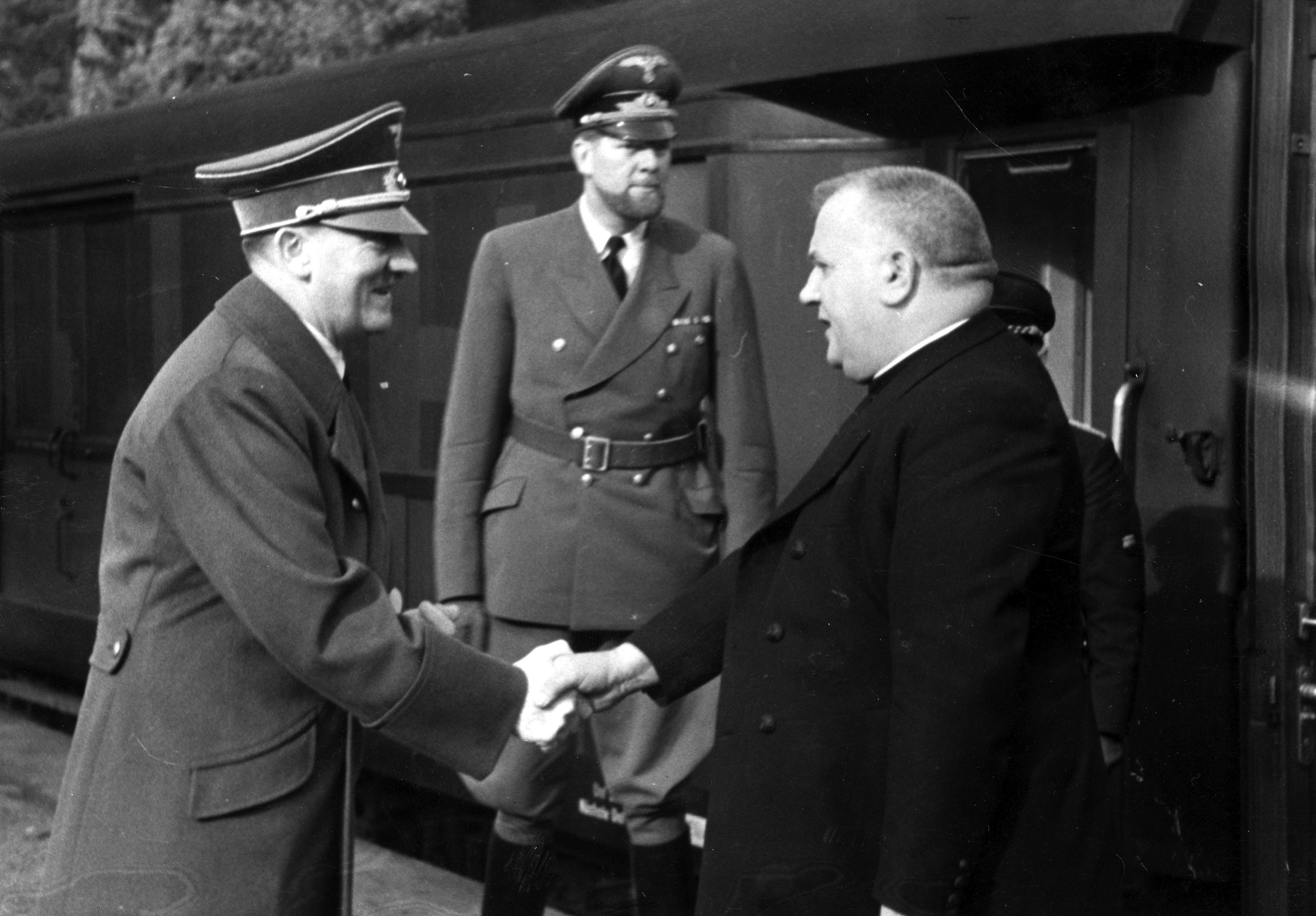
Adolf Hitler with Slovak President Jozef Tiso in 1941

In 1938 approximately 135,000 Jews resided in Slovakia, around 40,000 of them lived in Ruthenia and Subcarpathia, areas previously ceded to Hungary; most of whom led good lives despite the presence of antisemitism among the peasant population of Slovakia. As early as April 1939, anti-Jewish legislation was enacted, but this was religious and not racial in nomenclature. Nonetheless, the restrictions against Jews proceeded accordingly, blocking them from various professions, which was accompanied by violence against the Jews from the indigenous Hlinka Guard. Slovak Jews were among the first to be handed over en masse to the Nazis following the Wannsee Conference. Members of the Hlinka Guard went house to house and brutally seized young and fit Jews from their homes in March and April 1942, sending them to Auschwitz as slave laborers. The Hlinka Guard was assisted by the Freiwillige Schutzstaffel (Slovak volunteers in the SS). Between March through October 1942, Tiso's Slovak regime deported approximately 58,000 Jews to the German-occupied part of Poland. The Slovak government even paid the Germans for the Jews that were deported. The deportation of the remaining 24,000 was stopped due to the intervention of a Papal nuncio, whereby the Slovak president was informed that the German authorities were killing the Jews deported from Slovakia. Despite this action, approximately 12,600 Slovak Jews were still sent to Auschwitz, Theresienstadt, and other camps in Germany before the deportations ceased. Around half of them were killed in concentration camps. Aggregate numbers of Holocaust victims tabulated by experts indicate that at least 60,000 Jews as well as 400 Slovak Gypsies were killed; high estimates place the total number of Jewish victims from Slovakia at 71,000 persons. (Note: A more recent work from historian Dan Stone places the number of murdered Slovak Jews at 70,000.)

==== Slovenia ====
Parts of Slovenia were under Italian occupational control from June 1940 through September 1943, during which time, Jews and the refugees who joined them were protected from Nazi persecution. However, once the Nazi annexation of Slovenia took place, its Jews were targeted and deported to camps, particularly those residing in Montenegro.

==== Soviet Union ====
As early as 1903, Vladimir Lenin had already formulated a Communist ideology about the Jews, who he avowed, were not a nation since they did not possess any specified territory; this position was shared by Stalin and in the 1920s as many as 830,000 Soviet Jews were considered lishentsy (non-citizens). Some of those Jewish non-citizens eventually applied to work in factories and subsequently gained their citizenship but Jewish culture and literature faded fast under the Stalinist government. Nearly 90 percent of Russian Jews were urbanized and lived in one of eleven cities, with the largest groups in Moscow, Kiev, Odessa, and Leningrad. Antisemitic literature like the Protocols of the Learned Elders of Zion—which purports to describe a Jewish conspiracy for world domination—was popular in prewar Russia. Russian pogroms targeting the Jews were among the first in the modern period to incite its citizens to violence for the sake of political expediency. Still, around three million Jews lived across the vast expanse of the Soviet Union in January 1939. The Jewish population within the Soviet territories was distributed as follows: 300,000 in Bessarabia and northern Bukovina, 5,000 in Estonia, 95,000 in Latvia, 155,000 in Lithuania (excluding Vilna), 1.5 to 1.6 million in Soviet-occupied Poland, and another 3.1 million in the USSR.

During the invasion of the Soviet Union, the Jews were unaware of the Nazi anti-Jewish policies, partly as a result of Soviet silence about the matter. In the German-occupied Soviet territories, local Nazi collaborationist units represented over 80% of the available German forces, which provided them with a total of nearly 450,000 personnel organised in so-called Schutzmannschaften formations. Practically all of these units participated in the round-ups and mass shootings. The overwhelming majority were recruited in the western USSR and the Baltic region, areas recently occupied by the Soviets where the Jews were typically scapegoated, which exacerbated pre-Nazi antisemitic attitudes. Ukrainians in particular, displayed some of the most virulent hatred of the Jews and approved of German measures against them, despite their initial constraint in persecuting them. Eventually some 12,000 Ukrainian auxiliaries joined the Nazis in perpetuating the Final Solution and while many of them participated as Ukrainian nationalists, antisemitism proved a factor, one which they acquired on the job. Thousands of Ukrainians rushed to occupy businesses and homes vacated by persecuted Jews.

German Einsatzgruppen units, members of the Wehrmacht, Order Police, and auxiliary units mostly from Latvia, Lithuania and Ukraine were already engaged in killing operations in the summer of 1941 and by July of that year, they had helped kill 39,000 Ukrainian Jews, and another 26,000 Jews in Belarus. Local citizens aided by militias in Latvia, Bukovina, Romania, Bessarabia, Moldavia, Lithuania, Bialystok, Galicia, and elsewhere killed tens-of-thousands of Jews on their own accord. Throughout the remainder of 1941 to the autumn of 1942, the concerted murder operations proceeded apace. Not accounting for the deaths of victims from its territories, at least 700,000 Soviet Jews and 30,000 Gypsies were killed in the Holocaust. Another three-million Soviet soldiers were killed or starved-to-death by the Germans.

==== Spain ====
Franco and Hitler in Meeting at Hendaye, 1940

During World War II, Francisco Franco remained largely silent in regard to Jewish matters, and Spain became an unlikely escape route and haven for thousands of Jews. Franco was known to harbor virulent antisemitic beliefs and agreed with Hitler that Judaism, Communism, and cosmopolitanism were related threats to European society. Western European Jews still fled to Spain, as they sought to escape deportation to concentration camps from German-occupied France, but also Sephardic Jews from Eastern Europe, especially in Hungary. Trudy Alexy refers to the "absurdity" and "paradox of refugees fleeing the Nazis' Final Solution to seek asylum in a country where no Jews had been allowed to live openly as Jews for over four centuries." In the first years of the war, "Laws regulating their admittance were written and mostly ignored." Once the tide of war began to turn against the Germans, and Count Francisco Gómez-Jordana succeeded Franco's brother-in-law Serrano Súñer as Spain's foreign minister, Spanish diplomacy became "more sympathetic to Jews", although Franco himself "never said anything" about it. Around that same time, a contingent of Spanish doctors traveling in Poland were fully informed of the Nazi extermination plans by the Gauleiter Frankel of Warsaw, who was under the misimpression that they would share his views about the matter; when they returned home, they passed the information to Admiral Luís Carrero Blanco, who told Franco.

Allied diplomats discussed the possibility of Spain as a route to a containment camp for Jewish refugees near Casablanca, but it came to nothing due to a lack of support. Nonetheless, control of the Spanish border with France relaxed somewhat and thousands of Jews managed to cross into Spain (many by smugglers' routes). Almost all of them survived the war. The American Jewish Joint Distribution Committee operated openly in Barcelona. (Note: Shortly afterwards, Spain began giving citizenship to Sephardic Jews in Greece, Hungary, Bulgaria, and Romania; many Ashkenazic Jews also managed to be included, as did some non-Jews. The Spanish head of mission in Budapest, Ángel Sanz Briz, may have saved thousands of Ashkenazim in Hungary by granting them Spanish citizenship, placing them in safe houses, and teaching them minimal Spanish so they could pretend to be Sephardim, at least to someone who did not know Spanish. The Spanish diplomatic corps was performing a balancing act: Alexy conjectures that the number of Jews they took in was limited by how much German hostility they were willing to engender.) Francoist Spain, despite its aversion to Zionism and "Judeo"-Freemasonry, does not appear to have shared the rabid antisemitic ideology promoted by the Nazis. About 20,000 to 30,000 refugees, mainly Jews, were allowed to transit through Spain to Portugal and beyond. About 5,000 Jews in occupied Europe benefitted from Spanish legal protection. (Note: Some historians argue that these facts demonstrate the Franco regime's humane attitude, others point out that Spain only permitted transit and did not wish to increase its own small Jewish population. After the war, Franco's regime was quite hospitable to those who had been responsible for the deportation of the Jews, notably Louis Darquier de Pellepoix, Commissioner for Jewish Affairs (May 1942 – February 1944) under the Vichy Régime in France. See: Nicholas Fraser, "Toujours Vichy: a reckoning with disgrace", Harper's, October 2006, p. 86–94.)

In 2010, a document was found in Spanish archives, which revealed that Franco's government gave a main architect of the Nazi "Final Solution", Heinrich Himmler, a list of six thousand Jews living in Spain, upon his request. Jose Maria Finat y Escriva de Romani, Franco's chief of security issued an official order dated 13 May 1941 to all provincial governors requesting a list of all Jews, both local and foreign, present in their districts. After the list was compiled, Romani was appointed Spain's ambassador to Germany, enabling him to deliver the list to Himmler. Following the defeat of Germany in 1945, the Spanish government attempted to destroy all evidence of cooperation with the Nazis, but this official order survived. Spanish diplomats did save thousands of Jews, but it was done on their personal initiative.

==== Sweden ====
Before the onset of the Second World War, approximately 7,000 Jews resided in Sweden, most of whom lived in Stockholm. Like Switzerland, the Swedish government remained neutral due to its financial ties and the economic advantages it secured from a friendly relationship with Germany. There was even a small fascist pro-Nazi political group—known as the Swedish National Socialist Party—but they were unable to rally support for their cause. Swedish authorities were initially resistant to Jewish immigration into the country and several thousand were turned away. That was not to last, as by 1942 the Swedish government started allowing Norwegian and Finnish immigrants, as well as taking in some 900 Norwegian Jews. Another 7,000 Danish Jews and some 9,000 Danish Christians were permitted entrance to Sweden in 1943. In 1944, the Swedish diplomat Raoul Wallenberg traveled to Budapest and negotiated for the release of thousands of Hungarian Jews. Wallenberg's efforts secured passports for 15,000–20,000 Jews; he and those collaborating with him very likely saved the lives of some 70,000 Jews before the Red Army's arrival in Hungary during January 1945.

==== Switzerland ====
Proximity to Nazi Germany as a bordering nation made the Swiss government very tentative about dealing with the Jews. Sharing a physical border with Germany was also part of the reason that the Swiss maintained amicable economic relations with Germany. Correspondingly, both Sweden and especially Switzerland cooperated with the Nazis concerning banking and the exploitation of financial opportunities, as they knowingly accepted expropriation of money and goods, which previously belonged to Jewish companies and/or families for their own gain. Before 1938, Swiss alien and refugee policy was already restrictive toward certain people and groups, notably foreign Roma and Sinti. However, from that date, restrictions were intensified, particularly towards Jews. As part of that policy, the Swiss government requested that the German government mark the passports of German Jews with a "J" as they were not ready to grant asylum on the grounds of racial persecution. This policy took effect following the Anschluß with Austria, as the Swiss government was concerned about potential Jewish refugees fleeing and inundating them accordingly. In 1942 Swiss borders were completely closed to all Jewish refugees, which even included Jewish children.

By late October 1942, news of the Jewish catastrophe had reached Switzerland. After German troops seized control of Italy, which had withdrawn its political and military support when non-fascist Italians overthrew Mussolini, hundreds of Jews escaped over the mountain passes into neutral Switzerland. French resistance fighters and activists were also instrumental in helping smuggle Jews from France into neutral Spain and Switzerland, where they were able to find shelter. Sometime in 1944, some 1,684 Hungarian Jews arrived in Switzerland from Bergen-Belsen concentration camp, another 1,200 Jews from Theresienstadt concentration camp found safety in Switzerland and by February 1945, over 115,000 refugees of various types had made their way across the Swiss border to safety.

The International Commission of Experts (ICE) set up in 1996 by the Swiss parliament to examine relations between Nazi Germany and Switzerland reported: "Anti-Semitic views were more or less widespread amongst the political classes, the civil service, the military and the church." The ICE wrote: "by progressively closing the borders, delivering captured refugees over to their persecutors, and adhering to restrictive principles for far too long, the country stood by as many people were undoubtedly driven to certain death." Although accurate statistics are hard to put together, the commission concluded that "It must therefore be assumed that Switzerland turned back or deported over 20,000 refugees during the Second World War. Furthermore, between 1938 and November 1944, around 14,500 applications for entry visas submitted by hopeful emigrants to the Swiss diplomatic missions abroad were refused." (Note: The conclusions of the ICE report about refugees have been questioned, most notably by Jean-Christian Lambelet who criticises the statistical work and argues "inter alia" that there was a big gap between policy and actual practice. He believes that the figures of Jews that were sent back were overestimated. See: A Critical Evaluation of the Bergier Report on "Switzerland and Refugees during the Nazi Era", With a New Analysis of the Issue, University of Lausanne, Ecole des HEC, Department of Econometrics and Economics (DEEP), Research Paper No 01.03 January 2001. Accessed 2007-10-12)

==== Turkey ====
Although Turkey remained neutral throughout the Second World War, its policies toward its own Jewish population and toward Turkish Jews resident in Nazi-occupied Europe implicated the nation in the broader machinery of the Holocaust to a degree that official Turkish historiography has systematically obscured. The Turkish Republic's nation-building project—grounded in an assimilationist conception of citizenship with the imperatives of ethnic and linguistic homogenization—rendered the Jewish minority structurally vulnerable well before the Nazi rise to power, a vulnerability the wartime state compounded and did little to mitigate.

Turkish complicity operated principally through denationalization. From the mid-1930s onward, the Republic systematically stripped Turkish Jews resident in Europe of their citizenship through a nominally administrative "verification" process, rendering over 90 percent of the estimated twenty to thirty thousand Turkish Jews in Nazi-occupied Europe stateless—and therefore among the first populations targeted for deportation. Historian Marc David Baer documents that the Turkish ambassador to Berlin was informed by December 1941 of the mass murder of Jews in Poland and Ukraine, yet Turkish consular officials took no action to prevent the deportations of their own former citizens despite full awareness of the consequences awaiting them; in September 1943, acting on instructions from Ankara, the Turkish Embassy in Berlin explicitly declared to the German Foreign Ministry that a mass return migration of Turkish Jews should be prevented. For Turkish Jews in France, 80 were rescued by Turkish diplomats, 500 were repatriated, and 2,000 were sent to Auschwitz—a ratio that comprehensively refutes the postwar Turkish self-presentation as a nation of rescuers, for which no eyewitness or documentary evidence exists.

The domestic dimension of Turkish complicity was equally significant, since the 1942 Capital Tax (Varlık Vergisi) was levied at discriminatory rates—179% for Jews against 5% for Muslims—which compelled mass liquidation of Jewish-owned property, with those unable to pay dispatched to the Aşkale forced-labor camp in Erzurum. The concurrent Yirmi Kur'a İhtiyatlar conscripted non-Muslim men into segregated, unarmed labor battalions deployed in Anatolia's most remote regions. According to historians Marc David Baer and Sule Toktas, nationalist anti-minority politics rather than any principle of humanitarian neutrality towards the Jews seems to have been the prevalent theme for Turkish Jews at home or abroad.

==== United States ====
According to The Encyclopedia of the Holocaust, the U.S. failed to live up to its creed about accepting the "tired, poor, huddled masses" of the world during the Holocaust. The U.S. policy towards Jews fleeing Germany and claiming asylum was restrictive. In 1939, the annual combined German-Austrian immigration quota was 27,370. A famous incident was the U.S. denial of entry to the St. Louis, a ship loaded with 937 passengers. Almost all passengers aboard the vessel were Jews fleeing from Nazi Germany. Most were German citizens, some were from Eastern Europe, and a few were officially "stateless." The ship's original destination was Cuba, but the Cuban government, after admitting 28 refugees, ordered the ship to leave. The ship continued to the U.S., sailing so close to Florida that the passengers could see the lights of Miami. Some passengers on the St. Louis cabled President Franklin D. Roosevelt asking for refuge. Roosevelt never responded, though he could have issued an executive order to admit the St. Louis refugees. A State Department telegram sent to a passenger stated that the passengers must "await their turns on the waiting list and qualify for and obtain immigration visas before they may be admissible into the United States." Finally, the ship was forced to return to Europe and some 254 of its Jewish passengers eventually were murdered in the Holocaust.

On 17 December 1942, the United States finally issued a statement condemning the Nazi extermination program, but this turned out to be a meaningless gesture as did the follow-on Bermuda Conference of April 1943. By that same year, evidence of the death camps was circulating via firsthand accounts through the State Department, but U.S. leaders made no effort to bomb the camps or offer to take in hundreds of thousands of Jewish refugees. According to historian Victor Davis Hanson, American officials like then Assistant Secretary of State Breckinridge Long and Assistant Secretary of War John J. McCloy were "especially culpable" for their roles in "downplaying" evidence of the camps and for "incorrectly asserting that heavy bombers either could not reach camps like Auschwitz or could not be diverted from more important missions." In the end, the United States did not lift its immigration restriction against Jewish refugees until after the Second World War was over. (Note: For more on this see: https://encyclopedia.ushmm.org/content/en/article/united-states-immigration-and-refugee-law-1921-1980)

==== Vatican City (Catholic Church) ====
The Vatican's movement from institutional opposition to effective accommodation in 1933—German bishops had declared Nazi Party membership incompatible with Catholic teaching as recently as August 1931—unfolded with a speed that no postwar self-presentation of principled resistance could adequately explain. Nor was this capitulation anomalous since the Protestant Kirchenkampf was, as scholars at the United States Holocaust Memorial Museum have observed, "mostly an internal church matter, not a fight against National Socialism," with virtually no public opposition to antisemitism forthcoming from the leadership of either confession. The Reichskonkordat of 20 July 1933, whatever its defensive intent, projected an image of Vatican endorsement that the regime exploited immediately as legitimation; an effect the Holy See could not subsequently undo by remaining silent on the Nuremberg Racial Laws, on Reichskristallnacht, or ultimately on the Nazi genocide of the Jews itself.

Historian Michael Phayer argues that while Pius XII could not have halted the Holocaust, the pontiff's anticommunist fixation warped his moral judgment to the point that the Church failed to disseminate relevant intelligence about the exterminations that the Holy See demonstrably possessed. When hundreds of Jews were rounded up outside Vatican City during October 1943, the Nazis awaited protest from the pontiff that never materialized; instead, Pius requested an increased Nazi police presence in Rome to deal with Communist agitators. Despite being pressed repeatedly by western diplomats to address the Holocaust, Pius never bothered to discuss it with Germany's ambassador to the Vatican, Ernst von Weizsäcker, who was later convicted of war crimes against Jews during the Nuremberg trials.

== Legal proceedings against Nazis ==
The juridical notion of crimes against humanity was developed following the Holocaust. The sheer number of people murdered and the transnational nature of the mass killing shattered any notion of national sovereignty taking precedence over international law when prosecuting these crimes. There were a number of legal efforts established to bring Nazis and their collaborators to justice. Some of the higher-ranking Nazi officials were tried as part of the Nuremberg Trials, presided over by an Allied court; the first international tribunal of its kind. Other trials were conducted in the countries in which the defendants were citizens—in West Germany and Austria, many Nazis were let off with light sentences, with the claim of "following orders" ruled a mitigating circumstance, and many returned to society soon afterward.

An ongoing effort to pursue Nazis and collaborators resulted, famously, in the 1960 capture of Holocaust organizer Adolf Eichmann in Argentina (an operation led by Rafi Eitan) and to his subsequent trial in Israel in 1961. Simon Wiesenthal became one of the most famous Nazi hunters.

=== Postwar trials of collaborators ===
Beyond Germany and Austria, the postwar prosecution of nationals complicit in the Holocaust varied substantially in scope, legal framing, and political will—yet was, across virtually every jurisdiction, shaped less by principled reckoning with crimes against Jews than by the more politically tractable charge of treason against the nation. Tens of thousands of non-German collaborators were tried by courts in the nations Germany had occupied or that had allied themselves with the Nazi regime—from Norway's targeted prosecution of Nasjonal Samling leadership, culminating in the execution of Vidkun Quisling, to Poland's extensive trial process under the Decree of 31 August 1944, and the mass conviction proceedings conducted in Hungary and Czechoslovakia. In France, the épuration légale produced thousands of executions after formal trial and tens of thousands of prison sentences, yet the courts framed Vichy's anti-Jewish initiatives principally as German impositions rather than autonomous French policy—a construction that deferred genuine legal accountability for crimes against Jews until the trials of Paul Touvier and Maurice Papon decades later. The Netherlands investigated hundreds of thousands of suspected collaborators, of whom only a fraction appeared before a court; Soviet tribunals, meanwhile, had begun prosecuting collaborators as early as the Krasnodar Trial of 1943. By 1950, the exigencies of the Cold War had effectively curtailed this momentum—most convicted perpetrators not already executed were released during the 1950s—and it was not until the 1961 Eichmann trial that international attention consolidated around the Holocaust as a discrete historical crime, catalyzing the second wave of prosecutorial and historiographical engagement that would extend through the late twentieth century and beyond.

=== Flight from justice and other obfuscations ===
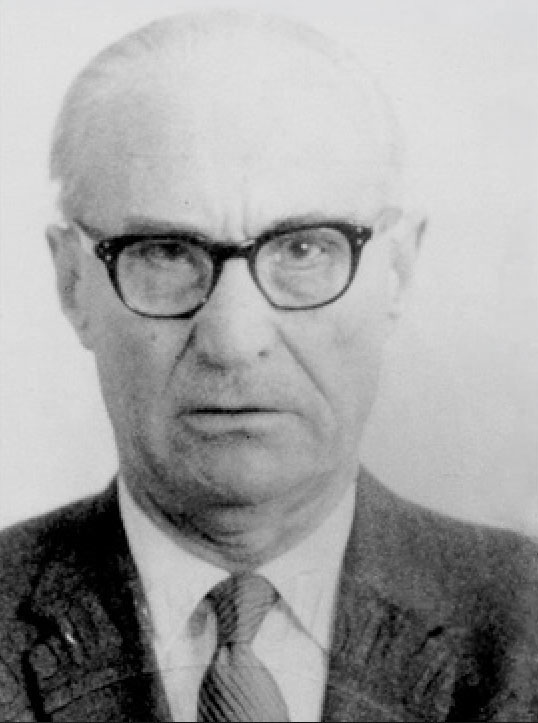
Aleksandras Lileikis was involved in the murder of 60,000 Jews in Lithuania. He later worked for the CIA. (Note: For more on this, see the following article: U.S. Recruited Over 1,000 ex-Nazis as anti-Communist Spies)

Some former Nazis escaped any charges. For example, Reinhard Gehlen, a former intelligence officer of the Wehrmacht, managed to work for the CIA, and created what informally became known as the Gehlen Organization. He recruited ex–intelligence-officers of the Wehrmacht and Nazis from the SS and SD to work for him. On 1 April 1956, the Bundesnachrichtendienst (BND; the German intelligence agency) was created from the Gehlen Organization, and transferred to the West German government. Gehlen became President of the BND and remained its head until 1968.

Klaus Barbie, known as "the Butcher of Lyon" for his role at the head of the Gestapo, was protected from 1945 to 1955 by MI5 and the CIA, before fleeing to South America where he had a hand in Luis García Meza Tejada's 1980 Cocaine Coup in Bolivia. Barbie was finally arrested in 1983 and sentenced to life imprisonment for crimes against humanity in 1987. (Note: Following an investigation by the Office of Special Investigations of United States Department of Justice in 1983, the U.S. government made a formal apology to France for enabling Barbie to escape French justice for thirty-three years.)

== See also ==
- Bibliography of The Holocaust
- Bibliography of Nazi Germany
- Collaboration with the Axis powers
- Command responsibility
- Holocaust studies
- Holocaust victims
- International response to the Holocaust
- "Like sheep to the slaughter"
- List of companies involved in the Holocaust
- Rescue of Jews during the Holocaust
