= Eric A. Johnson (historian) =

American historian (born 1948)

Eric A. Johnson (born May 9, 1948) is an American historian, social scientist, and professor of history at Central Michigan University. Johnson specializes in the history of crime and violence, the Holocaust, and the history of modern Germany.

== Education ==
Johnson was born in Salem, Massachusetts on May 9, 1948. He studied at Brown University and the Stockholm University. In 1976 he received his doctorate from the University of Pennsylvania.

== Career ==
Johnson joined Central Michigan University in 1976. He has taught an array of courses, primarily focused on modern Europe, giving lectures especially on the history of Europe, Germany, and the Holocaust, and social science methods and approaches to historical study.

Johnson has worked at several universities in Europe and held visiting professorships of varying lengths. In the academic year of 1988-1989 Johnson taught at the University of Strathclyde in Glasgow, Scotland as part of an exchange program. Between 1989 and 1995 he was a visiting professor at the Center for Historical Social Research of the University of Cologne. Whilst there, Johnson was in charge of a small research team working on a study of the terror in Nazi Germany. In the academic year of 1995-1996 Johnson was a fellow of the Princeton Institute for Advanced Study and in 1998-1999 Johnson was a fellow of the Dutch Institute for Advanced Studies in Wassenaar.

Barry Gewen, writing in the Los Angeles Times, said of Johnson's Nazi Terror: The Gestapo, Jews, and Ordinary Germans (2000) that "more often than one would wish, his book reads like an academic monograph ... Fortunately, the dry numbers are leavened with individual portraits, like those of the local Eichmanns, that keep the narrative moving".

== Books ==
- 2013 - Murder and Violence in Modern Latin America. Wiley Blackwell, Hoboken, NJ (Co-edited with Ricardo Salvatore and Pieter Spierenburg).
- 2005 - What We Knew: Terror, Mass Murder, and Everyday Life in Nazi Germany. Basic Books, New York (with Karl-Heinz Reuband).
- 2004 - Social Control in Europe: 1800 to 2000. The Ohio State University Press (editor, with Clive Emsley and Pieter Spierenburg).
- 2000 - Nazi Terror: The Gestapo, Jews, and Ordinary Germans. Basic Books, New York.
- 1996 - The Civilization of Crime: Violence in Town and Country since the Middle Ages. University of Illinois Press (editor, with Eric Monkkonen).
- 1995 - Urbanization and Crime: Germany 1871-1914. Cambridge University Press.
- 1992 - Urban and Rural Crime. Special issue of Social Science History, co-edited with Jan Sundin.
- 1990 - Quantification and Criminal Justice History in International Perspective. Special issue of Historical Social Research / Historische Sozialforschung.
