= Eric Henry Monkkonen =

American historian (1942–2005)

Eric Henry Monkkonen (August 17, 1942 – May 30, 2005) was an American urban and social science historian who conducted authoritative studies on the history of crime as well as urban development. His work produced evidence that countered and overturned many assumptions, such as that crime rates are higher in urban areas, and increased during post-war periods and economic downturns. His works on the history of crime in several cities were extensive, cataloging close to every recorded homicide in New York City since 1798, and every homicide in Los Angeles since 1827, and conducting extensive studies on several more cities, primarily in the Western world. At one time he believed that murder was largely "a problem of men", and that "If men take charge of anything ... it must be of the notion that real men don't kill, that self-respect means shrugging off an insult, and that the better manliness accrues to him who does not fight. Other countries have done this, and so can the United States."

== Life ==
Monkkonen was born in 1942 in Kansas City, and grew up in Duluth, Minnesota. He gained an interest in studying murder as a graduate student in the late 1960s, in part because it was clearly studied over a long period of time. He earned his bachelor's, master's, and doctorate degrees from the University of Minnesota between 1964 and 1973, after which he taught at the University of North Carolina in Charlotte for a few years. After publishing The Dangerous Class: Crime and Poverty in Columbus, Ohio, 1860-1885 in 1975, Monkkonen moved to the University of California, Los Angeles (UCLA), and continued working there for the rest of his career. He was diagnosed with prostate cancer in 1995, and died on May 30, 2005, at the age of 62 in Culver City, California. His family and colleagues at UCLA established the Eric Monkkonen Fund to support students working in social history.

== Research ==
Monkkonen's comparison of cities in the United States with other cities in the Western world led him to conclude that violence was endemic in the U.S., which has had a homicide rate much higher than the rest of the Western world except Russia, and over 200 years the murder rate in New York City was five times that of London, even after removing murders with guns. He also found that the U.S. had a disinclination to prosecute murders, such as with the first three decades in 19th century New York City, when most murders went unpunished, and London executed four times the number of offenders.

By gleaning records going back deep into the history of major cities and conducting far-reaching studies of crime in the U.S., Monkkonen was able to precisely measure how much crime there was, overturning many assumptions. Using his meticulously constructed database of 1,781 cases in New York City, he found that factors such as poverty, crowding, a corrupt justice system, and riots are not necessarily preconditions to an increase in homicides. He found that some of the most miserable times in New York City's history, such as during the Great Depression were the times with the lowest murder rates. He furthermore found that New York City had a lower murder rate in the first half of the 1900s than the nation as a whole; his database of murders that he compiled between 1830 and 1960 showed that Los Angeles in 1900 was four times more violent than New York City. He also found that the murder rate in Los Angeles declined after World War II; it was commonly believed that violence on the battlefield made brought the tendency of violence back at home, but Monkkonen speculated that soldiers returning home were sickened by gunplay and were actually less likely to use weapons to kill, and that they were also more focused on their domestic needs in starting families. He even claimed that cities are not necessarily more murderous than the country, a point that was the most debated after his book Murder in New York City came out, but which nonetheless won high praise.

== Bibliography ==
- The Dangerous Class: Crime and Poverty in Columbus, Ohio, 1860-1885, (Harvard University Press, 1975)
- Police in Urban America: 1860-1920 (Cambridge University Press, February 27, 1981)
- "Walking to Work: Tramps in America, 1790-1935" (Lincoln: University of Nebraska Press, 1984)
- The Dangers of Synthesis. Essay. American Historical Review (1986).
- America Becomes Urban: The Development of U.S. Cities and Towns, 1780-1980 (University of California Press, 1988)
- History of Urban Police. Essay. Crime and Justice (1992).
- Violence and Theft, Part 2 (with K.J. Saur) (January 1, 1992)
- Engaging the Past: The Uses of History Across the Social Sciences (Duke University Press, 1994)
- The Local State: Public Money and American Cities (Stanford University Press, 1995)
- Urban Police in the United States (1996)
- The Civilization of Crime: Violence in Town and Country Since the Middle Ages (with Eric Arthur Johnson) (University of Illinois Press, 1996).
- Murder in New York City (University of California Press, 2001)
- Crime, Justice, History (Ohio State University Press, January 1, 2002)
- Homicide: Explaining America's Exceptionalism. Essay. American Historical Review (2006).
- "Homicide in Los Angeles, 1827-2002," and "Western Homicide, 1830-1870" were published posthumously in the Journal of Interdisciplinary History and The Pacific Historical Review.
- Crime and Justice in American History - editor of series
