= Otto, 2nd Prince of Salm-Horstmar =

German nobleman (1833–1892)

Otto I

Prince of Salm-Horstmar
- Reign: 1866–1892
- Predecessor: Friedrich
- Successor: Otto II
- Born: 8 February 1833; Coesfeld, Kingdom of Prussia
- Died: 15 February 1892 (aged 59); Bonn, Kingdom of Prussia
- Spouse: Countess Emilie zu Lippe-Biesterfeld (m. 1864; died 1892)
- Issue: Otto, 3rd Prince of Salm-Horstmar
Names
- Otto Friedrich Karl zu Salm-Horstmar
- House: Salm-Horstmar
- Father: Friedrich, 1st Prince of Salm-Horstmar
- Mother: Countess Elisabeth zu Solms-Rödelheim-Assenheim

Otto Friedrich Karl, Fürst zu Salm-Horstmar (8 February 1833 – 15 February 1892) was a German nobleman and politician.

== Early life ==
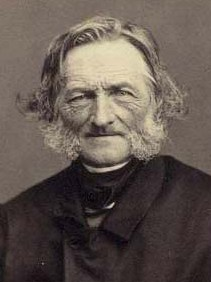
Photograph of his father, Friedrich

Otto was born on 8 February 1833 at Coesfeld. (Note: Today, Coesfeld is the capital of the Coesfeld district in the northwestern part of North Rhine-Westphalia, Germany.) He was the son of Countess Elisabeth Anna Caroline Julie Amalie zu Solms-Rödelheim-Assenheim, and Rhinegrave Friedrich of Salm-Grumbach, who was created Prince of Salm-Horstmar in 1816. His younger brother was Prince Eduard of Salm-Horstmar, who married Countess Sophie von Schimmelmann. Another brother, Prince Karl of Salm-Horstmar, married Princess Elise of Hohenlohe-Schillingsfürst (youngest daughter of Franz Joseph, Prince of Hohenlohe-Schillingsfürst).

His paternal grandparents were Wild- and Rhinegrave Karl Ludwig zu Salm-Grumbach und Dhaun, and Countess Friederike zu Sayn-Wittgenstein-Hohenstein. His maternal grandparents were Count Volrath zu Solms-Rödelheim und Assenheim and Countess Philippine Charlotte zu Solms-Laubach.

== Career ==
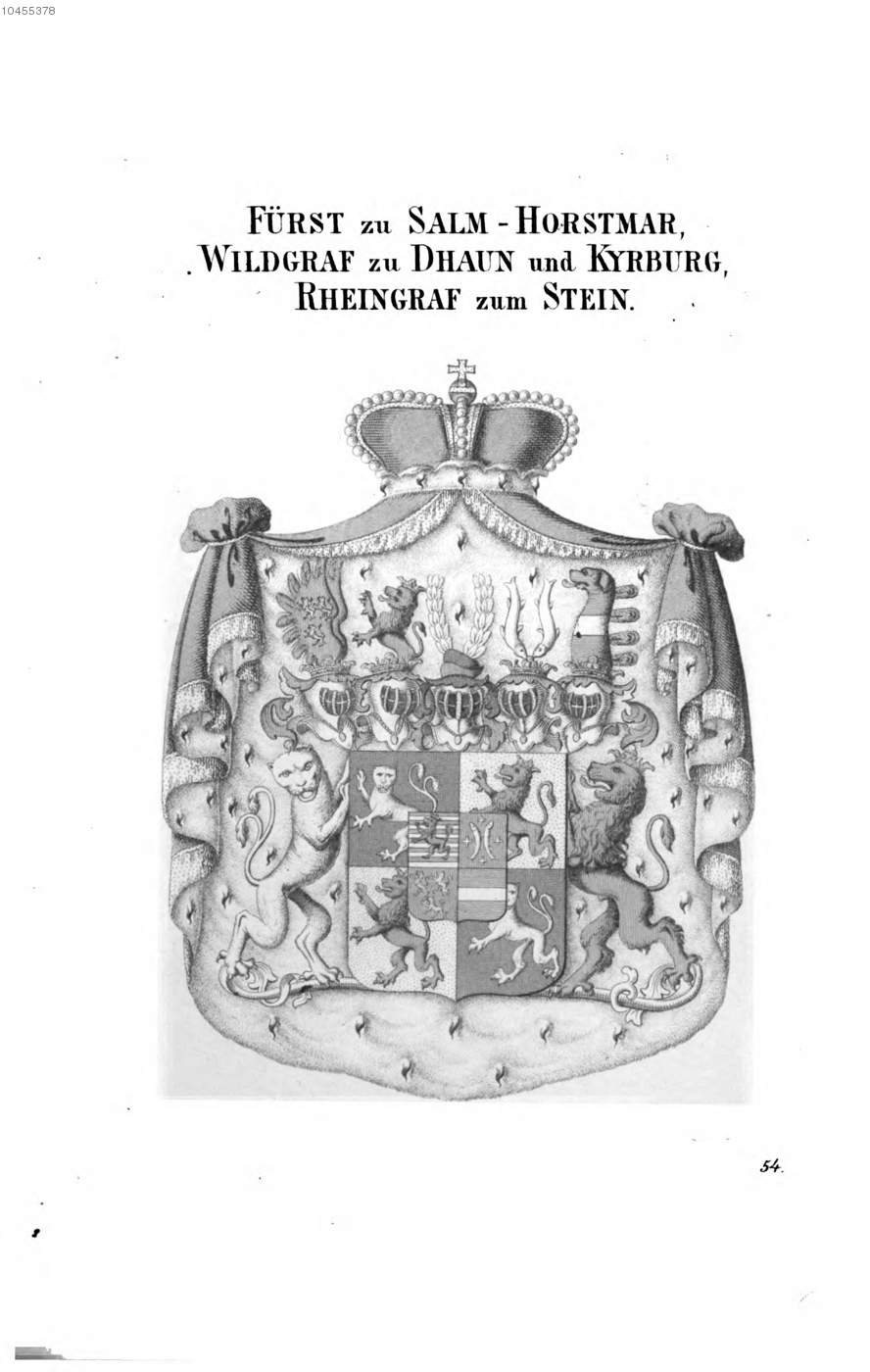
Coat of arms of the Princes of Salm-Horstmar

Upon the death of his father in 1866, Salm-Horstmar then took over the family estates. (Note: The Principality of Salm-Horstmar was a short-lived Napoleonic County in far northern North Rhine-Westphalia, Germany, located around Horstmar, to the northeast of Münster. It was created in 1803 for his father, Wild- and Rhinegrave Friedrich of Salm-Grumbach, following the loss of Grumbach and other territories west of the Rhine to France. The county was mediatised to the Kingdom of Prussia in 1813 and the Wild- and Rhinegrave was awarded a princely title within the Kingdom of Prussia three years later, on 22 November 1816 by Frederick William III of Prussia.)

As a head of a former Imperial house in Prussia for the County of Horstmar, Salm-Horstmar was a hereditary member of the Prussian House of Lords from 1866 until his death in 1892. He was also a Colonel à la suite in the Army.

== Personal life ==
On 18 June 1864, Prince Otto I married Countess Emilie zu Lippe-Biesterfeld (1841–1892), a daughter of Julius, Count of Lippe-Biesterfeld and Countess Adelheid of Castell-Castell (a granddaughter of Karl Ludwig, Prince of Hohenlohe-Langenburg). Her brother, Ernest, Count of Lippe-Biesterfeld, married Countess Karoline von Wartensleben. With her, he had the following seven children:

- Friedrich Julius Carl Ernst Casimir Max, Hereditary Prince of Salm-Horstmar (1865–1871), who died young.
- Prince Julius zu Salm-Horstmar (1866–1866), who died in infancy.
- Otto Adalbert Friedrich August Gustav Alexander, 3rd Prince of Salm-Horstmar (1867–1941), who married Countess Rosa zu Solms-Baruth, a daughter of Friedrich von Solms-Baruth, 2nd Prince of Solms-Baruth.
- Princess Elisabeth Adelheid Mathilde Emma Karoline zu Salm-Horstmar (1870–1953), who married Count Adalbert Adolf zu Erbach-Fürstenau, a son of Count Raimund Alfred zu Erbach-Fürstenau and Princess Luise of Hohenlohe-Ingelfingen (a daughter of Prince Adolf of Hohenlohe-Ingelfingen).
- Prince Wilhelm Julius Adolf Magnus Leopold Casimir Eduard zu Salm-Horstmar (1872–1919).
- Prince Julius Friedrich Casimir Carl Emich zu Salm-Horstmar (1881–1901), who died young.
- Prince Emich Karl Rudolf Friedrich Wilhelm Otto zu Salm-Horstmar (1883–1959), who married Princess Sabine zu Schoenaich-Carolath, a daughter of Karl Ludwig, 5th Prince of Carolath-Beuthen, and Katharina von Reichenbach-Goschütz.

His wife, Emilie, Princess of Salm-Horstmar, died at Varlar Castle on 11 February 1892 and the Prince of Salm-Horstmar died four days later on 15 February 1892 at Bonn.

== Notes ==
Otto I, 2nd Prince of Salm-Horstmar House of Salm Cadet branch of the House of Salm Born: 8 February 1833 Died: 15 February 1892
German nobility
Preceded by Friedrich	Prince of Salm-Horstmar; 1866–1892	Succeeded by Otto II
