= Otto, 3rd Prince of Salm-Horstmar =

German nobleman (1867–1941)

Otto II

Prince of Salm-Horstmar
- Reign: 1892–1941
- Predecessor: Otto I
- Successor: Philipp Franz
- Born: 23 September 1867; Varlar Castle, Rosendahl, Kingdom of Prussia
- Died: 2 March 1941 (aged 73); Varlar Castle, Rosendahl, Nazi Germany
- Spouse: Countess Rosa zu Solms-Baruth (m. 1903; died 1941)
- Issue: Princess Luise Emilie of Salm-Horstmar; Prince Otto Ludwig of Salm-Horstmar; Prince Hans Christoph of Salm-Horstmar; Philipp Franz, 4th Prince of Salm-Horstmar; Prince Karl Walrad Emich of Salm-Horstmar; Princess Friederike Juliane of Salm-Horstmar; Prince Johann Giselbert of Salm-Horstmar; Princess Marie Luise of Salm-Horstmar
Names
- Otto Adalbert Friedrich August Gustav Alexander zu Salm-Horstmar
- House: Salm-Horstmar
- Father: Otto, 2nd Prince of Salm-Horstmar
- Mother: Countess Emilie zu Lippe-Biesterfeld

Otto Adalbert Friedrich August Gustav Alexander, Fürst zu Salm-Horstmar (23 September 1867 – 2 March 1941) was a German nobleman, anti-Semite and right-wing politician.

== Early life ==
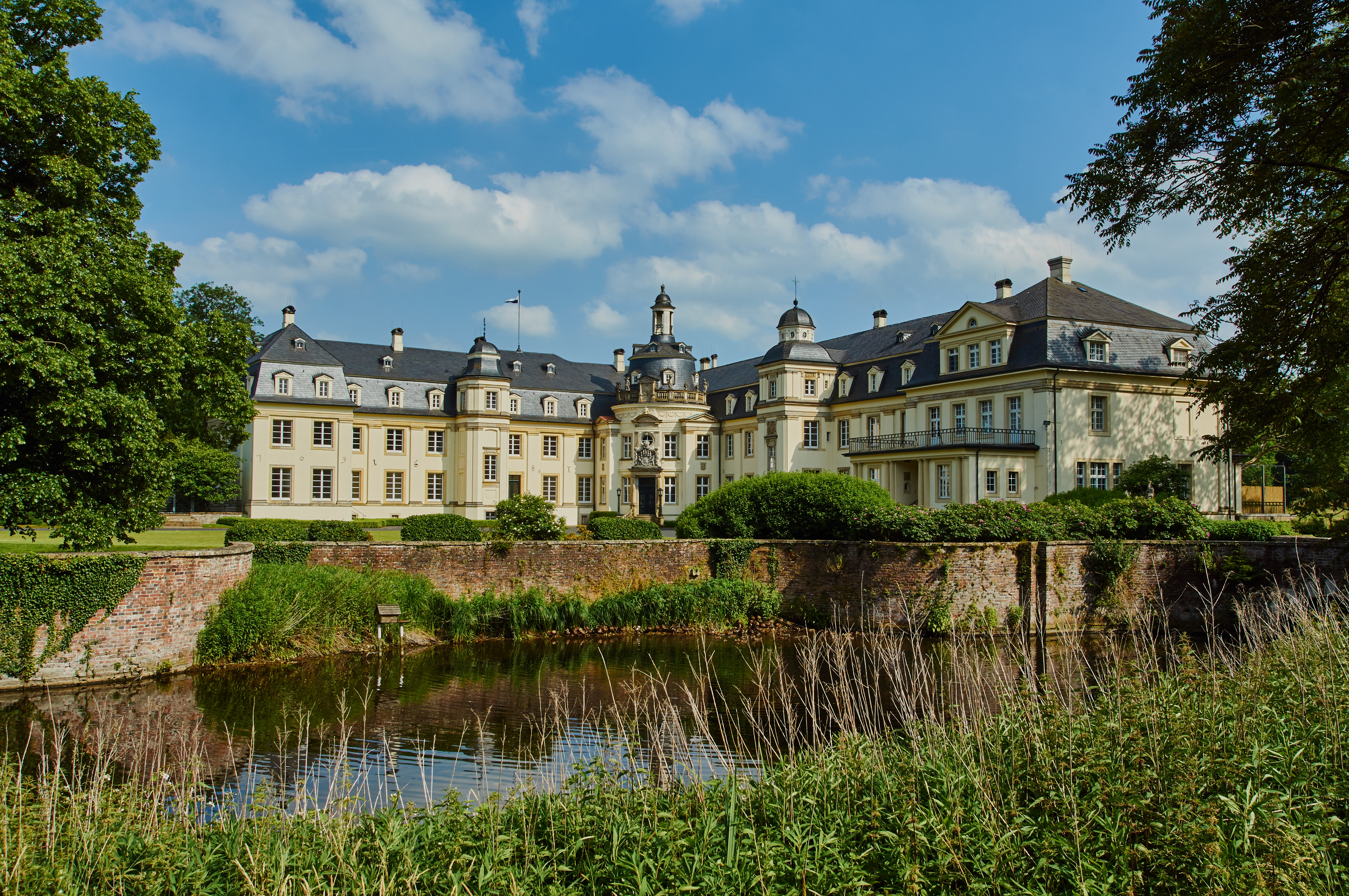
Varlar Castle

Otto was born on 23 September 1867 at Varlar Castle (Schloss Varlar) in Rosendahl. (Note: Today, Schloss Varlar is in the Coesfeld district in the northwestern part of North Rhine-Westphalia, Germany.) He was the son of Otto, 2nd Prince of Salm-Horstmar (1833–1892), and Countess Emilie zu Lippe-Biesterfeld (1841–1892).

His paternal grandparents were Countess Elisabeth Anna Caroline Julie Amalie zu Solms-Rödelheim-Assenheim, and Rhinegrave Friedrich of Salm-Grumbach, who was created Prince of Salm-Horstmar in 1816. His paternal uncles were Prince Karl and Prince Eduard of Salm-Horstmar. His maternal grandparents were Julius, Count of Lippe-Biesterfeld and Countess Adelheid of Castell-Castell (a granddaughter of Karl Ludwig, Prince of Hohenlohe-Langenburg). His uncle, Ernest, Count of Lippe-Biesterfeld, married Countess Karoline von Wartensleben.

After graduating from school, he studied law in Lausanne, Geneva, and Berlin. Between 1889 and 1892, he was an officer and also attended the Agricultural University of Berlin.

== Career ==
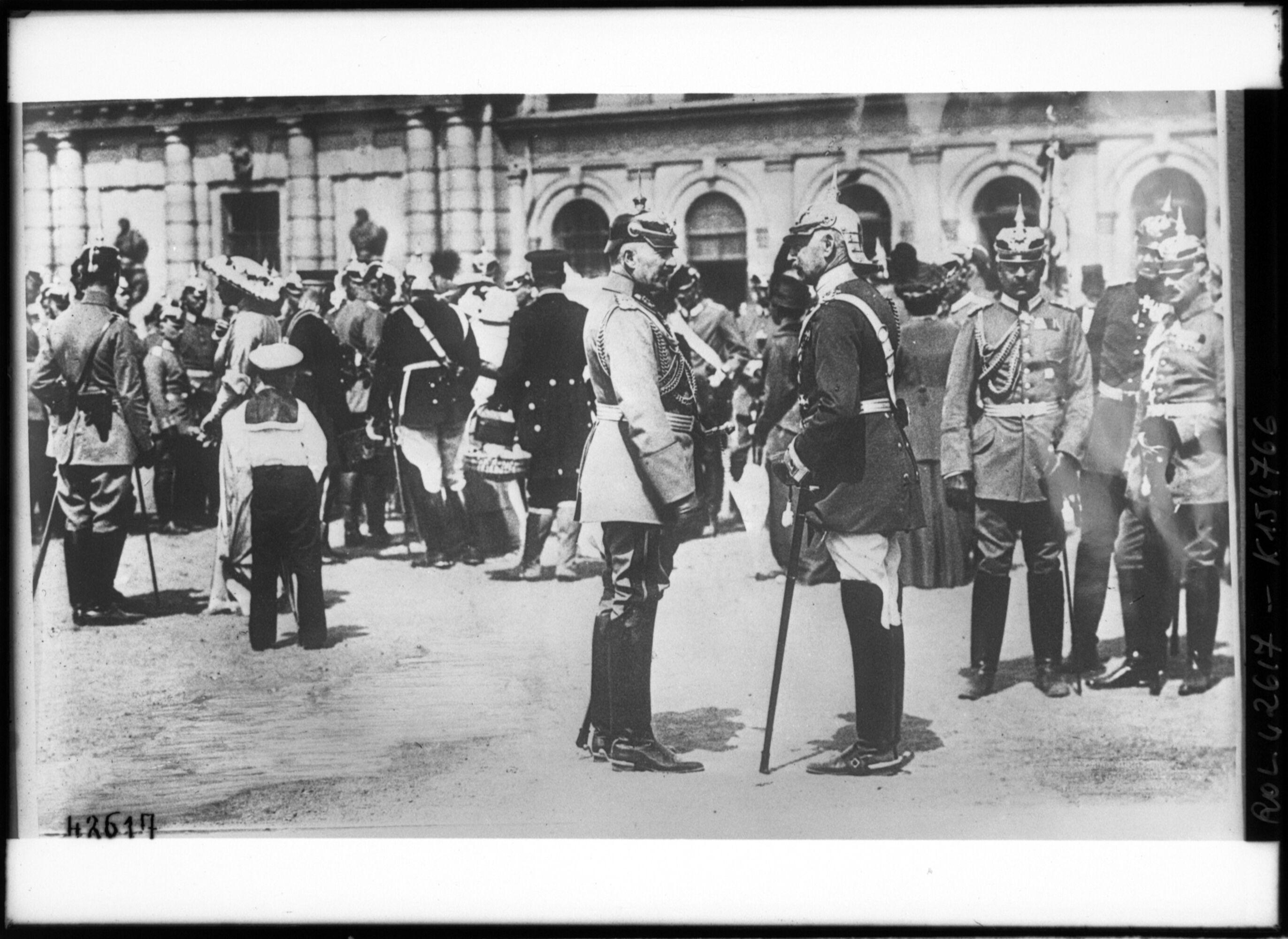
Kaiser Wilhelm II speaking to the Prince of Salm-Horstmar, 1914

Upon the death of his father in 1892, Salm-Horstmar then took over the family estates. (Note: The Principality of Salm-Horstmar was a short-lived Napoleonic County in far northern North Rhine-Westphalia, Germany, located around Horstmar, to the northeast of Münster. It was created in 1803 for Wild- and Rhinegrave Friedrich of Salm-Grumbach, following the loss of Grumbach and other territories west of the Rhine to France. The county was mediatised to the Kingdom of Prussia in 1813 and the Wild- and Rhinegrave was awarded a princely title within the Kingdom of Prussia three years later, on 22 November 1816 by Frederick William III of Prussia.) He was also involved in agricultural interest groups, including as chairman of the German Landowners' Association. From 1915 until his death, he was president of the Westphalian Equestrian Club. Salm-Horstmar also campaigned for the expansion of the Münster Academy (Akademie Münster) into a full university, for which he was awarded a doctorate from the University of Westphalia in 1902. In addition, the Historical Commission for Westphalia (founded by Alfred, 7th Prince of Salm-Salm) accepted him as a full member in 1904.

As a hereditary member, Salm-Horstmar belonged to the Prussian House of Lords. He was also a member of the Westphalian Provincial Parliament from 1911 to 1919. Between 1916 and 1919, he served as its chairman.

=== Political career ===
Having previously served as first vice president, Salm-Horstmar was chairman of the German Navy League (German: Deutscher Flottenverein) between 1902 and 1908, which advocated the development of a strong navy. He was an active organizer of radical right-wing agitation. At the end of World War I, he became a member of the German Fatherland Party. He viewed the war as a conflict between a "Jewish-democratic" and a "German-aristocratic" worldview.

During the Weimar Republic, he was a leading member of the Pan-German League and an opponent of the Republic. In 1920, he was co-responsible for the first German translation of "The Protocols of the Elders of Zion." In 1931, he unsuccessfully called on German President Paul von Hindenburg to appoint a new government without Social Democrats and without Chancellor Heinrich Brüning. This new right-wing government was to be based on the Harzburg Front.

== Personal life ==
In 1903, Prince Otto II married Countess Rosa Marie Bertha Louise zu Solms-Baruth (1884–1945), a daughter of Friedrich II von Solms-Baruth, 2nd Prince of Solms-Baruth and Countess Ida Louise von Hochberg-Fürstenstein. With her, he had the following eight children:

- Princess Luise Emilie Friederike Elisabeth zu Salm-Horstmar (1904–1904), who died in infancy.
- Prince Otto Ludwig Wilhelm Hans Friedrich Karl Eduard zu Salm-Horstmar (1906–1927), who died unmarried, predeceasing his father.
- Prince Hans Christoph Leopold Emich Hermann zu Salm-Horstmar (1907–1908), who died infancy.
- Philipp Franz Friedrich Conrad Wilhelm Chlodwig, 4th Prince of Salm-Horstmar (1909–1996), who married Countess Marie Therese zu Castell-Castell, a daughter of Count Otto Friedrich zu Castell-Castell and Princess Amelie of Löwenstein-Wertheim-Freudenberg.
- Prince Karl Walrad Emich Hermann Bolko Friedrich zu Salm-Horstmar (1911–1991), who married Susanne Jantsch, the former wife of German industrialist Rudolf August Oetker. (Note: From Jantsch's marriage to Rudolf August Oetker, she was the mother of four, including Richard Oetker.)
- Princess Friederike Juliane Luise Emilie Feodora Anna zu Salm-Horstmar (1912–2000), who married Prince Ludwig Ferdinand of Sayn-Wittgenstein-Berleburg, a son of Richard, 4th Prince of Sayn-Wittgenstein-Berleburg and Princess Madeleine of Löwenstein-Wertheim-Freudenberg, in 1935. (Note: Prince Ludwig Ferdinand of Sayn-Wittgenstein-Berleburg (1910–1943) had two older brothers, Gustav Albrecht who was also killed in 1944, and Christian Heinrich who died in 1983. Gustav's son Richard was married to Princess Benedikte of Denmark, sister of Queen Margrethe II and of former Queen Anne-Marie of Greece.)
- Prince Johann Giselbert Alexander Leopold Rudolf Friedrich zu Salm-Horstmar (1916–1939), who died young.
- Princess Marie Luise Eleonore Adelma Rosa zu Salm-Horstmar (1918–2015), who married Heinrich IV, Prince Reuss of Köstritz, a son of Prince Heinrich XXXIX Reuss and Countess Antonia of Castell-Castell, in 1954.

The Prince of Salm-Horstmar died at Varlar Castle on 2 March 1941. His widow died on 12 June 1945.

=== Descendants ===
Through his daughter Friederike Juliane, he was a grandfather of Prince Ludwig-Ferdinand zu Sayn-Wittgenstein-Berleburgh, father of Princess Anna of Bavaria, Prince August Fredrik zu Sayn-Wittgenstein-Berleburg, and Princess Theodora Sayn-Wittgenstein.

Otto II, 3rd Prince of Salm-Horstmar House of Salm Cadet branch of the House of Salm Born: 23 September 1867 Died: 2 March 1941
German nobility
Preceded by Otto I	Prince of Salm-Horstmar; 1892–1941	Succeeded by Philipp Franz
