= Friedrich, 1st Prince of Salm-Horstmar =

German nobleman (1799–1866)

Friedrich
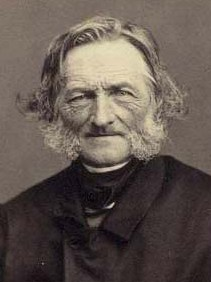

Prince of Salm-Horstmar
- Reign: 1816–1866
- Predecessor: Inaugural
- Successor: Otto II
- Born: 11 March 1799
- Died: 27 March 1866 (aged 67); Varlar Castle, Kingdom of Prussia
- Spouse: Countess Elisabeth zu Solms-Rödelheim-Assenheim (m. 1826)
- Issue: Princess Mathilde; Princess Emma; Prince Karl; Otto, 2nd Prince of Salm-Horstmar; Prince Eduard
Names
- Wilhelm Friedrich Karl August zu Salm-Horstmar
- House: Salm-Horstmar
- Father: Count Karl Ludwig zu Salm-Grumbach
- Mother: Countess Wilhelmine Friederike zu Sayn-Wittgenstein-Hohenstein

Wilhelm Friedrich Karl August, Fürst zu Salm-Horstmar (until 1816 Rheingraf zu Salm-Grumbach; 11 March 1799 – 27 March 1866) was a German nobleman and politician.

== Early life ==
Friedrich was born on 11 March 1799 into the Grumbach line of the Salm family, which belonged to the high nobility. He was the son of Wild- and Rhinegrave Karl Ludwig zu Salm-Grumbach und Dhaun (1729–1799), and Countess Wilhelmine Friederike zu Sayn-Wittgenstein-Hohenstein (1767–1849).

Just a few months after his birth, Friedrich inherited the possessions of the House of Salm-Grumbach, which were on the left bank of the Rhine and became French in 1802. The House of Salm-Grumbach was compensated with territories of the Bishopric of Münster around Coesfeld, which as the County of Horstmar were sovereign territory under the direct rule of the Empire until 1806. As he was still a minor, his uncle, Wilhelm Christian von Salm-Grumbach, and mother were his guardians and regent of the County of Horstmar.

== Career ==
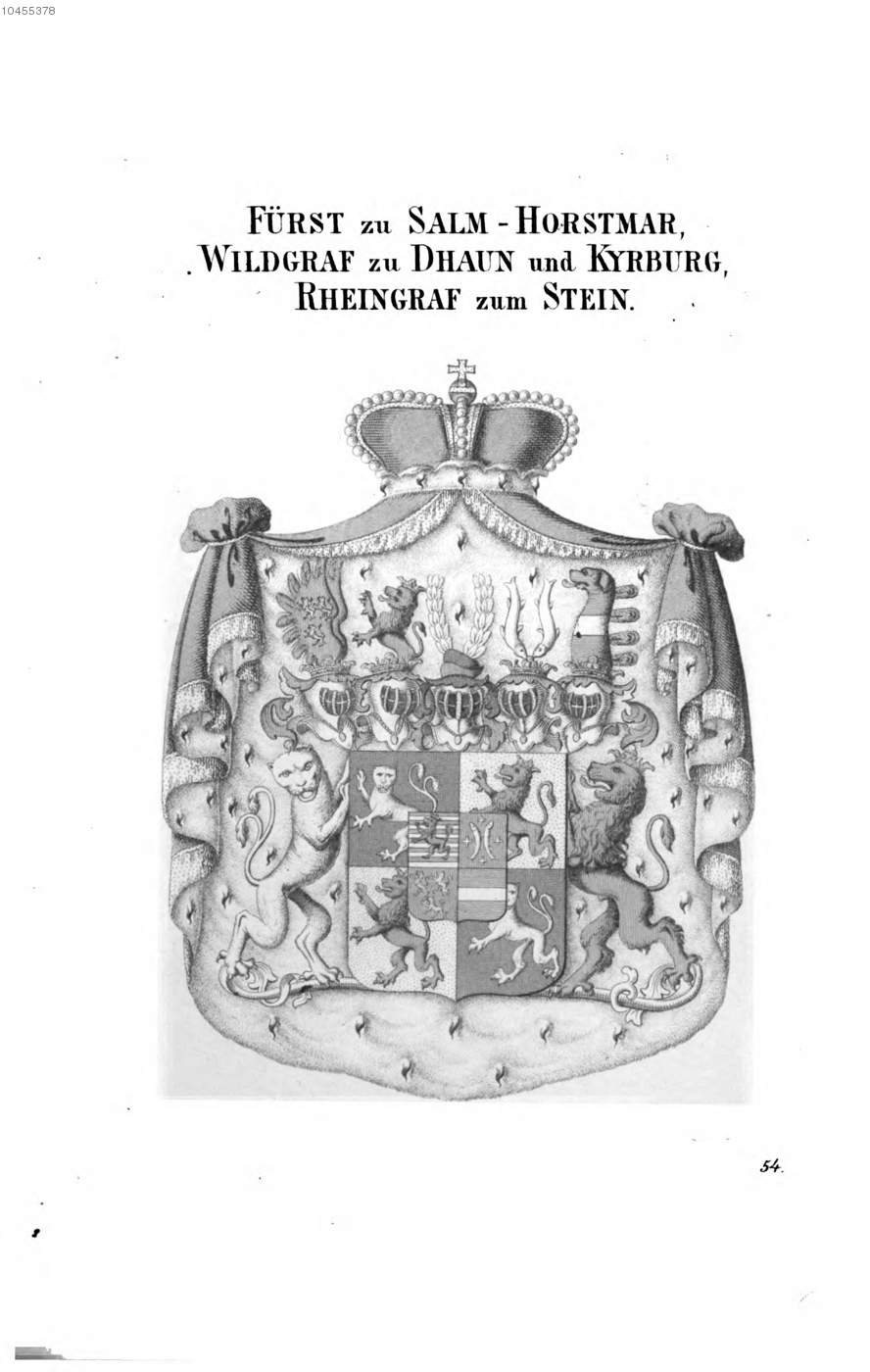
Coat of arms of the Princes of Salm-Horstmar

The Wild- and Rhinegraves of Salm-Grumbach were Lords of the County of Horstmar, which was an independent Napoleonic County in far northern North Rhine-Westphalia (to the northeast of Münster), for several years between 1802 and 1806, which became part of the Grand Duchy of Berg in 1806 through the Act of Confederation of the Rhine. After the annexation of Grumbach and other territories west of the Rhine by the French which was incorporated into the Department of Lippe between 1811 and 1813, and a transitional administration by the General Government between the Weser and the Rhine, the remaining property was mediatised to the Kingdom of Prussia in 1813 by the Congress of Vienna; there the Counts of Salm-Grumbach were raised to the hereditary princely title on 22 November 1816 by King Frederick William III and from then on called themselves Salm-Horstmar.

In 1836 he was made an honorary citizen of Coesfeld. As a nobleman, Friedrich zu Salm-Horstmar had a seat in the Westphalian Provincial Diet, in 1847/48 in the First United Parliament (Erster Vereinigter Landtag) and Second United Diet (Zweiter Vereinigter Landtag) and, since 1854, a hereditary seat in the Prussian House of Lords, to which he belonged until his death in 1866.

=== Scientific career ===
The Prince of Salm-Horstman also worked on scientific topics and published the work Experiments and Results on Plant Nutrition (Versuche und Resultate über die Nahrung der Pflanzen) in 1854. In 1856 he became an honorary member of the Royal Prussian Academy of Sciences and, in 1857, an honorary member of the Göttingen Academy of Sciences and Humanities.

== Personal life ==
In 1826, Countess Elisabeth Anna Caroline Julie Amalie zu Solms-Rödelheim-Assenheim (1806–1886), a daughter of Count Volrath zu Solms-Rödelheim und Assenheim and Countess Philippine Charlotte zu Solms-Laubach. Together, they were the parents of:

- Princess Mathilde Elisabeth Friederike Wilhelmine Charlotte Ferdinande Amalie zu Salm-Horstmar (1827–1908), who married Count Friedrich zu Solms-Rödelheim-Assenheim, in 1862.
- Princess Emma Elisabeth Friederike Caroline Ferdinande zu Salm-Horstmar (1828–1892), who married Prince August von Schoenaich-Carolath (a grandson of the 3rd Prince of Carolath-Beuthen) in 1857.
- Prince Karl Alexis Heinrich Wilhelm Adolph Friedrich Ferdinand Franz Otto Eduard zu Salm-Horstmar (1830–1909), who ceded the rights of primogeniture to his brother Otto; he married Princess Elise of Hohenlohe-Schillingsfürst (youngest daughter of Franz Joseph, Prince of Hohenlohe-Schillingsfürst), in 1868.
- Otto Friedrich Karl, 2nd Prince of Salm-Horstmar (1833–1892), who married Countess Emilie zu Lippe-Biesterfeld, a daughter of Julius, Count of Lippe-Biesterfeld and Countess Adelheid of Castell-Castell (a granddaughter of Karl Ludwig, Prince of Hohenlohe-Langenburg), in 1864.
- Prince Eduard Maximilian Volrath Friedrich zu Salm-Horstmar (1841–1923), a member of the International Olympic Committee; he married Countess Sophie von Schimmelmann, in 1873.

Friedrich died at Varlar Castle on 27 March 1866.

=== Descendants ===
Through his son Otto, he was posthumously a grandfather of Otto, 3rd Prince of Salm-Horstmar (1867–1941), who married Countess Rosa zu Solms-Baruth (a daughter of Friedrich von Solms-Baruth, 2nd Prince of Solms-Baruth).

Friedrich, 1st Prince of Salm-Horstmar House of Salm Cadet branch of the House of Salm Born: 11 March 1799 Died: 27 March 1866
German nobility
Preceded by Friedrich	Prince of Salm-Horstmar; 1816–1866	Succeeded by Otto I
