= Prince Eduard of Salm-Horstmar =

German Prince (1841–1923)

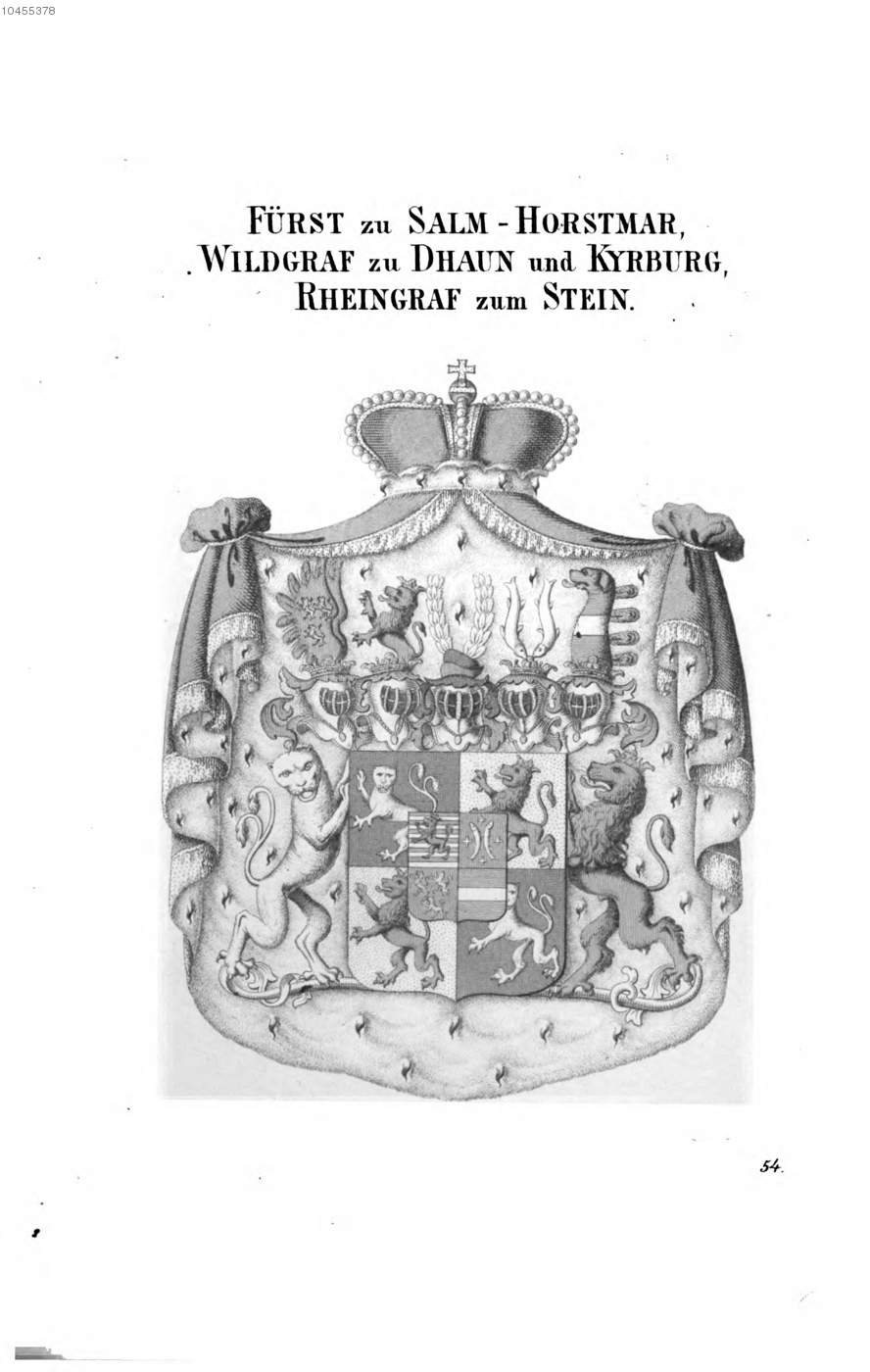
Coat of arms of the Princes of Salm-Horstmar

Prince Eduard Maximilian Vollrath Friedrich zu Salm-Horstmar (22 August 1841 – 23 December 1923), was a Prussian Cavalry General, sports official and member of the International Olympic Committee.

== Early life ==
Karl zu Salm-Horstmar was born on 22 August 1841 at Varlar Castle near Osterwick into the Grumbach line of the Salm family, which belonged to the high nobility. He was the third son of Countess Elisabeth Anna Caroline Julie Amalie zu Solms-Rödelheim-Assenheim, and Rhinegrave Friedrich of Salm-Grumbach, who was created Prince of Salm-Horstmar in 1816. Among his elder brothers were Prince Karl of Salm-Horstmar (who ceded the rights of primogeniture to Otto) and Otto, 2nd Prince of Salm-Horstmar.

His paternal grandparents were Wild- and Rhinegrave Karl Ludwig zu Salm-Grumbach und Dhaun, and Countess Friederike zu Sayn-Wittgenstein-Hohenstein. His maternal grandparents were Count Volrath zu Solms-Rödelheim und Assenheim and Countess Philippine Charlotte zu Solms-Laubach.

== Career ==
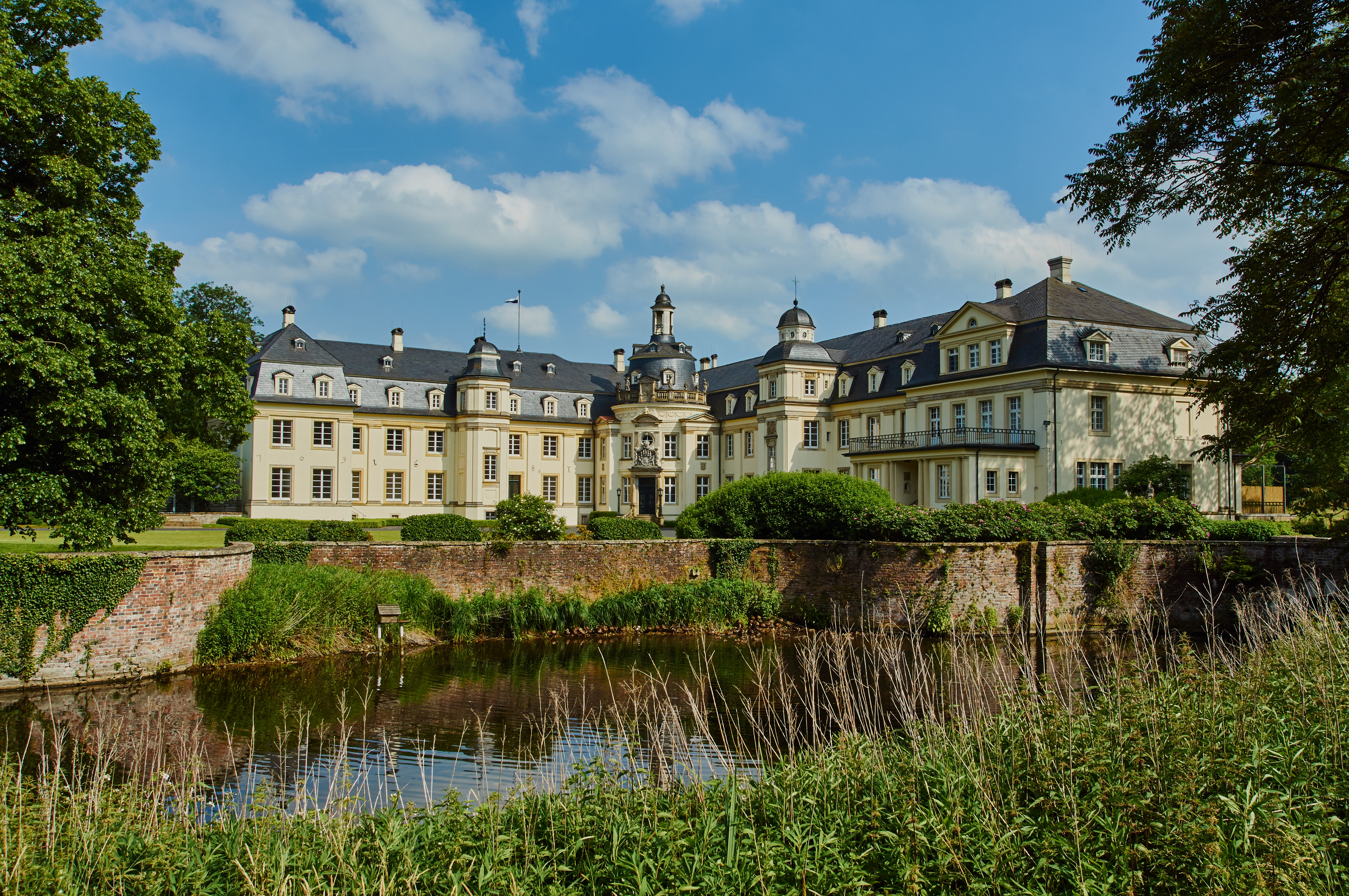
Varlar Castle

The Wild- and Rhinegraves of Salm-Grumbach were Lords of the County of Horstmar, which was an independent Napoleonic County in far northern North Rhine-Westphalia (to the northeast of Münster), for several years between 1802 and 1806, which became part of the Grand Duchy of Berg in 1806 through the Act of Confederation of the Rhine. After the annexation of Grumbach and other territories west of the Rhine by the French which was incorporated into the Department of Lippe between 1811 and 1813, and a transitional administration by the General Government between the Weser and the Rhine, the remaining property was mediatised to the Kingdom of Prussia in 1813 by the Congress of Vienna; there the Counts of Salm-Grumbach were raised to the hereditary princely title on 22 November 1816 by King Frederick William III and from then on called themselves Salm-Horstmar.

Beginning in 1858, Salm-Horstmar was a cavalry officer in the Prussian Army and served, among other positions, from 14 May 1890 to 17 October 1894 as Commander of the 1st Guard Cavalry Brigade, from 18 October 1894 to 10 September 1908 as President of the German General Staff, and during World War I as Adjutant General to Wilhelm II. He retired after the end of the War.

As vice president of the German committee for the 1900 Summer Olympics in Paris, he became president of the 1904 Olympics, which at that time had the functions of the National Olympic Committee. In this capacity, he was a member of the International Olympic Committee from 1901 to 1905. He was well connected in Berlin as a member of the Union-Klub (the forerunner of the Directorate for Thoroughbred Breeding and Racing) and the Imperial Automobile Club.

== Personal life ==
Prince Eduard was married Countess Sophie von Schimmelmann (1850–1928), a daughter of Count Ernst von Schimmelmann and Baroness Adelaide von Lützerode. Together, they were the parents of two daughters:

- Princess Luise Elisabeth Augusta Ernestine Adelaide of Salm-Horstmar (1874–1948)
- Princess Margarethe Dorothea Antonia Elisabeth Adelaide Fanny Caroline of Salm-Horstmar (1881–1920)

Prince Eduard died on 23 December 1923 in Potsdam.
