= Prince Karl of Salm-Horstmar =

German Prince (1830–1909)

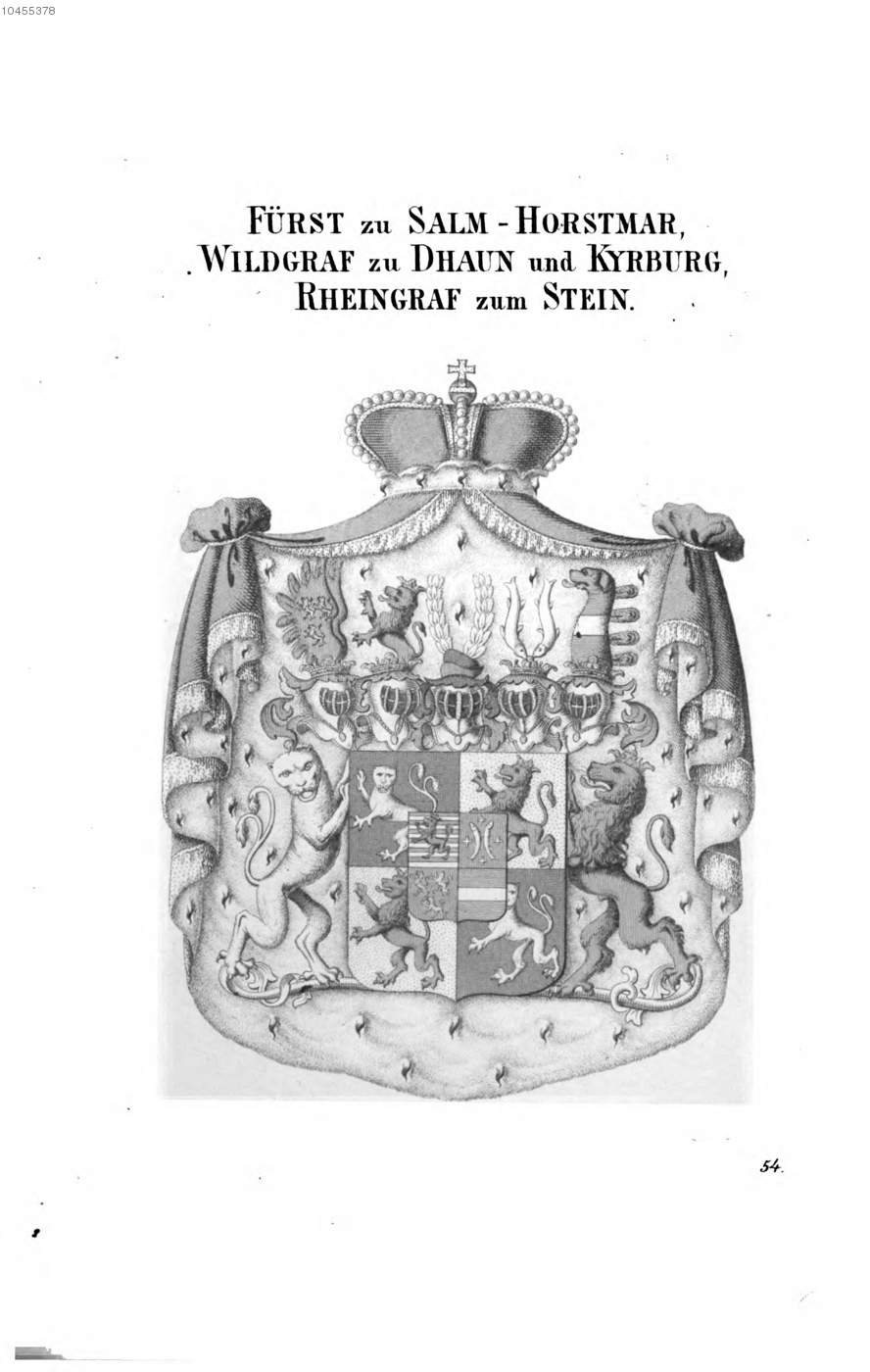
Coat of arms of the Princes of Salm-Horstmar

Prince Karl Alexis Heinrich Wilhelm Adolph Friedrich Ferdinand Franz Otto Eduard zu Salm-Horstmar (20 October 1830 – 9 September 1909), was a German prince.

== Early life ==
Karl zu Salm-Horstmar came from the Grumbach line of the Salm family, which belonged to the high nobility. He was the eldest son of Countess Elisabeth Anna Caroline Julie Amalie zu Solms-Rödelheim-Assenheim, and Rhinegrave Friedrich of Salm-Grumbach, who was created Prince of Salm-Horstmar in 1816. Among his siblings were brothers Prince Eduard of Salm-Horstmar (who married Countess Sophie von Schimmelmann) and Otto, 2nd Prince of Salm-Horstmar.

His paternal grandparents were Wild- and Rhinegrave Karl Ludwig zu Salm-Grumbach und Dhaun, and Countess Friederike zu Sayn-Wittgenstein-Hohenstein. His maternal grandparents were Count Volrath zu Solms-Rödelheim und Assenheim and Countess Philippine Charlotte zu Solms-Laubach.

He attended the University of Bonn.

== Career ==
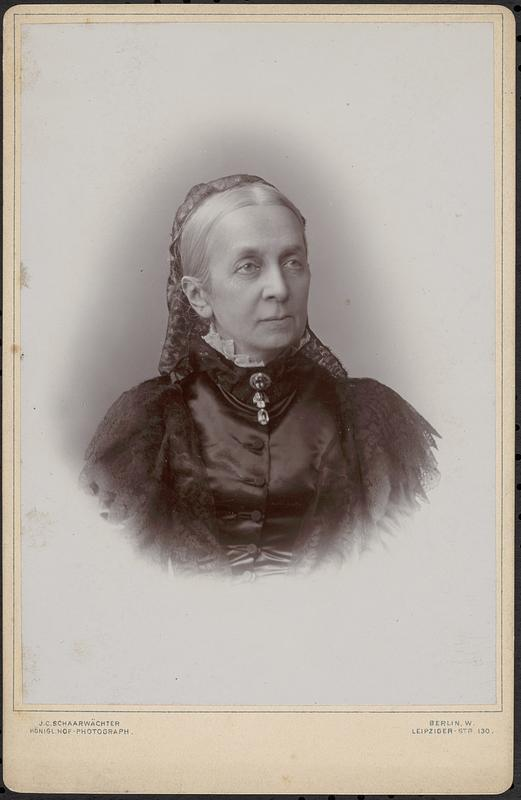
Photograph of his wife, Princess Elise of Hohenlohe-Schillingsfürst, by Julius Schaarwächter, 1899

The Wild- and Rhinegraves of Salm-Grumbach were Lords of the County of Horstmar, which was an independent Napoleonic County in far northern North Rhine-Westphalia (to the northeast of Münster), for several years between 1802 and 1806, which became part of the Grand Duchy of Berg in 1806 through the Act of Confederation of the Rhine. After the annexation of Grumbach and other territories west of the Rhine by the French which was incorporated into the Department of Lippe between 1811 and 1813, and a transitional administration by the General Government between the Weser and the Rhine, the remaining property was mediatised to the Kingdom of Prussia in 1813 by the Congress of Vienna; there the Counts of Salm-Grumbach were raised to the hereditary princely title on 22 November 1816 by King Frederick William III and from then on called themselves Salm-Horstmar.

In 1861, Prince Karl, a "religious enthusiast," traveled to the United States to "bring enlightenment to the savages".

On 27 March 1865, Prince Karl ceded the rights of primogeniture to his younger brother Otto. His wife "did not share her husband's views and she was particularly annoyed by his renunciation of his ancestral rights. She tried hard to find a legal flaw in the cession, but to no avail."

== Personal life ==
On 1 August 1868, Prince Karl was married to Princess Elise of Hohenlohe-Schillingsfürst (1831–1920), the youngest daughter of Franz Joseph, Prince of Hohenlohe-Schillingsfürst and Princess Konstanze of Hohenlohe-Langenburg. The marriage remained childless.

Prince Karl died on 9 September 1909 in Höxter.
