= Immelmann =

Immelmann, not infrequently also spelled "immelman" may refer to:

== Aviation ==
- The Immelmann turn, an aerial maneuver developed by Max Immelmann
- The Immelmann-Kaserne (Immelmann-Barracks), an Army Air Base in Celle, Germany
- Immelmann III, Hitler's personal air transport, a Focke-Wulf Fw 200 Condor
- Taktisches Luftwaffengeschwader 51 (Reconnaissance Wing 51) "Immelmann", Cold-War German Air Force
- Sturzkampfgeschwader 2 "Immelmann", WWII German Air Force fighter squadron

== People ==
- Klaus Immelmann (1935—1987), German zoologist and ethnologist
- Max Immelmann (1890–1916), a German flying ace from World War I credited with invention of aerobatic maneuvers
- Willem Hendrik Immelmann (born 1904), mayor of Windhoek, South Africa; see List of mayors of Windhoek

=== Fictional characters ===
- Maxi Immelmann, a fictional character from Strike Witches
- Hayate Immelmann, a fictional character from Macross Delta; see List of Macross Delta characters
- Claus "Immelmann" Valca, a fictional character from Last Exile; see List of Last Exile characters

== Other uses ==
- The Immelmann loop, a roller coaster feature derived from the Immelmann turn
- Immelmann, a K V class air control ship of the German Navy; see List of naval ships of Germany
- Immelmann, a Karl Meyer-class seaplane tender; see List of ship commissionings in 1941

== See also ==
- Hans Imelmann (1897–1917) German WWI flying ace
- Immelman, an alternate spelling
