= Immerman =

Immerman is a surname. Notable people with the surname include:

- Karl Immermann (1796–1840), German dramatist, novelist, and poet
- Neil Immerman (born 1953), American computer scientist
- Richard H. Immerman (born 1949), American historian and writer

== See also ==
- Immelman
