= Ernest Foot =

English World War I flying ace

Ernest Leslie Foot
- Born: 19 May 1895; Pulborough, Sussex, England
- Died: 23 June 1923 (aged 28); Near Chertsey, Surrey, England
- Military career
- Allegiance: United Kingdom
- Branch: British Army; Royal Air Force
- Service years: 1914–1919
- Rank: Major
- Nickname: Feet
- Units: Oxfordshire and Buckinghamshire Light Infantry; No. 11 Squadron RFC; No. 60 Squadron RFC; No. 56 Squadron RFC
- Awards: Military Cross
- Other work: Commercial and test pilot, instructor and air racer.

Major Ernest Leslie Foot MC (19 May 1895 – 23 June 1923) was an English World War I flying ace credited with five aerial victories. He was the best friend of Albert Ball.

== Military career ==
Foot was commissioned as a temporary second lieutenant in the infantry on 27 October 1914, and was promoted to lieutenant in the Oxfordshire and Buckinghamshire Light Infantry on 28 December 1914. He was transferred from the OBLI to the General List and appointed a flying officer (observer) in the Royal Flying Corps on 21 October 1915. On 20 December 1915 he was granted Aviators' Certificate No. 2257 after flying a Maurice Farman biplane at the Military Flying School at Farnborough, and was appointed a flying officer on 10 February 1916.

Foot was assigned to No. 11 Squadron RFC, where he befriended Ball. On 23 July 1916 he was appointed a flight commander with the temporary rank of captain. Between 9 September and 15 September 1916, flying Royal Aircraft Factory FE.2b No. 7016, Foot destroyed three enemy aircraft. The day after his third win, he transferred to No. 60 Squadron. There was a SPAD S.VII on trial with the unit; Foot used it to destroy an Albatros two-seater on 28 September. He then used a Nieuport 17 to drive down a Roland C.II on 21 October 1916. On 26 October, Foot was shot down in flames by German ace Hans Imelmann; somehow, Foot crash-landed unscathed. On 3 November, he was sent back to England for a rest. Shortly afterwards his award of the Military Cross was gazetted.

He joined No. 56 Squadron on 10 March 1917, as it mobilized as the first squadron to operate the Royal Aircraft Factory SE.5. Once again, he was a flight commander. However, an auto accident the night before the squadron departed for France knocked Foot out of flying for the remainder of the war. However, he continued to serve, being promoted to temporary major on 30 April 1918, and was an instructor at the No. 1 School of Special Flying based at RAF Gosport. Finally, on 11 April 1919, Foot was transferred to the RAF's unemployed list, bringing his military career to an end.

== Postwar career ==
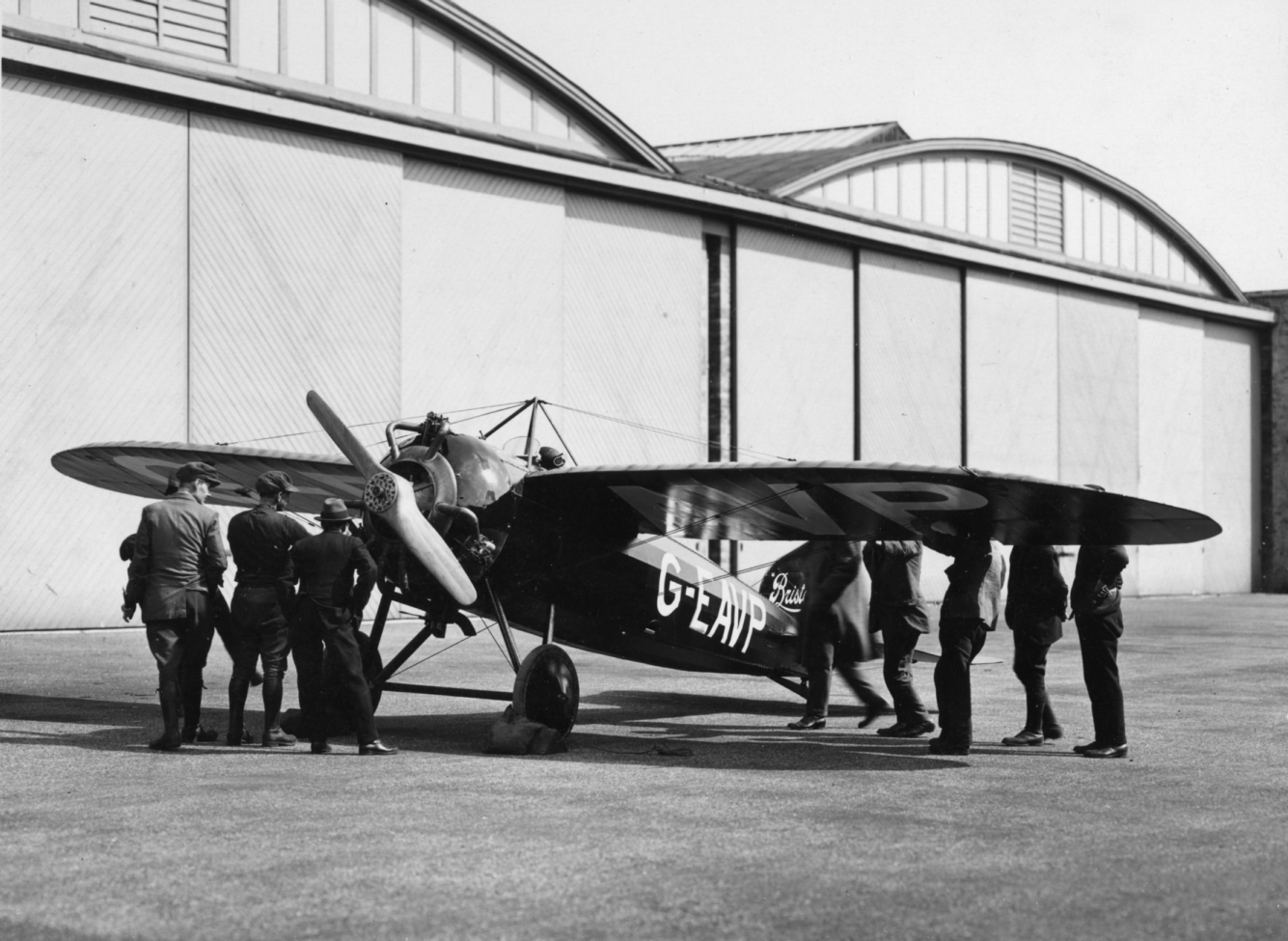
G-EAVP, the Bristol M.1 in which Foot was killed

After leaving the Royal Air Force Foot joined the Handley Page Transport company as a commercial pilot flying the London to Paris passenger route, finally leaving the company in April 1923 to take a position with the Bristol Aeroplane Company as a test pilot and instructor with their flying school operated on behalf of the Royal Air Force Reserve. On 21 April 1923 Foot was granted a commission as a probationary flying officer (Class "A") in the General Duties Branch of the RAF Reserve.

Foot was also a noted competitor in the popular air races of the day. In July 1921 he took part in the Sixth Aerial Derby, organised by the Royal Aero Club, flying a 100-mile (161 km) circuit around London twice, in a Martinsyde F.4 fitted with a 300 hp (224 kW) Hispano-Suiza engine. Unfortunately engine problems caused his retirement during the first lap.

In September 1921 he led the "White Team" in a relay team event for the Air League Challenge Cup, as part of the first Aviation Race Meeting held by the Royal Aero Club at Croydon Aerodrome. Again mechanical problems meant that his team had to withdraw.

In June 1922, at the Third Croydon Aviation Race Meeting, Foot took third place in the First Sprint Handicap flying the Martinsyde F.4.

A year later, in June 1923, Foot was entered into the first Grosvenor Challenge Cup. He was sponsored by Sir George Stanley White, the Managing Director of the Bristol Company, and flew the Bristol M.1D monoplane, registered G-EAVP, fitted with a 100 hp (75 kW) Bristol Lucifer engine. The race took place in stages, beginning at Lympne, Kent, with stops at Croydon, Birmingham, and Bristol, before returning to Croydon, and ending at Lympne. When Foot landed at Filton Aerodrome, Bristol, his aircraft had developed a fuel leak, and Foot appeared affected by petrol fumes. However, after repairs he set off again, but his aircraft crashed on the Stonehill Road between Chertsey and Chobham, and burst into flames. Foot was killed instantly. He had been married only a few months before.

== Honours and awards ==
Military Cross
Temporary Lieutenant (Temporary Captain) Ernest Leslie Foot, General List and R.F.C.
For conspicuous skill and gallantry. When flying a single-seater scout, he dived on to five hostile machines, which were flying at about 2,500 feet, and drove one to the ground as a wreck. On many other occasions he has shown great determination when fighting enemy machines.
