= Immelman =

Immelman is a surname. Notable people with the surname include:

- Henry Immelman (born 1994), South African rugby union footballer
- Mark Immelman (born 1970), South African sportscaster
- Nicolaas Immelman (born 1993), South African rugby union footballer
- Niel Immelman (born 1944), South African classical pianist
- Quinton Immelman (born 1981), South African rugby referee
- Trevor Immelman (born 1979), South African professional golfer

== See also ==
- Hans Imelmann (1897–1917) WWI flying ace
- Immelmann (disambiguation)
