= Reichenbach (surname) =

Reichenbach is a German surname. Notable people with the surname include:

- Bernhard Reichenbach (1888–1975), German communist
- Carl Reichenbach (1788–1869), chemist and metaphysician, studied mesmerism and somnambulism
- Ernst Stromer von Reichenbach (1871–1952), German paleontologist
- François Reichenbach (1921–1993), French filmmaker
- Georg Friedrich von Reichenbach (1771–1826), astronomical instrument maker
- Harry Reichenbach (1882–1931), American press agent and publicist
- Hans Reichenbach (1891–1953), philosopher and linguist
- Heinrich Gottlieb Ludwig Reichenbach (1793–1879), German botanist and ornithologist
- Heinrich Gustav Reichenbach (1823–1889), German botanist
- Klaus Reichenbach (born 1945), German politician
- Ted Ryko (Edward Reichenbach) (1892–1968), Australian cyclist and photographer
- Sébastien Reichenbach (born 1989), Swiss cyclist

== See also ==
- Emma Pieczynska-Reichenbach (1854–1927), Swiss feminist and abolitionist
