= Varlar Castle =

Castle in Rosendahl, Germany

Coordinates: 51°59′10″N 7°10′46″E

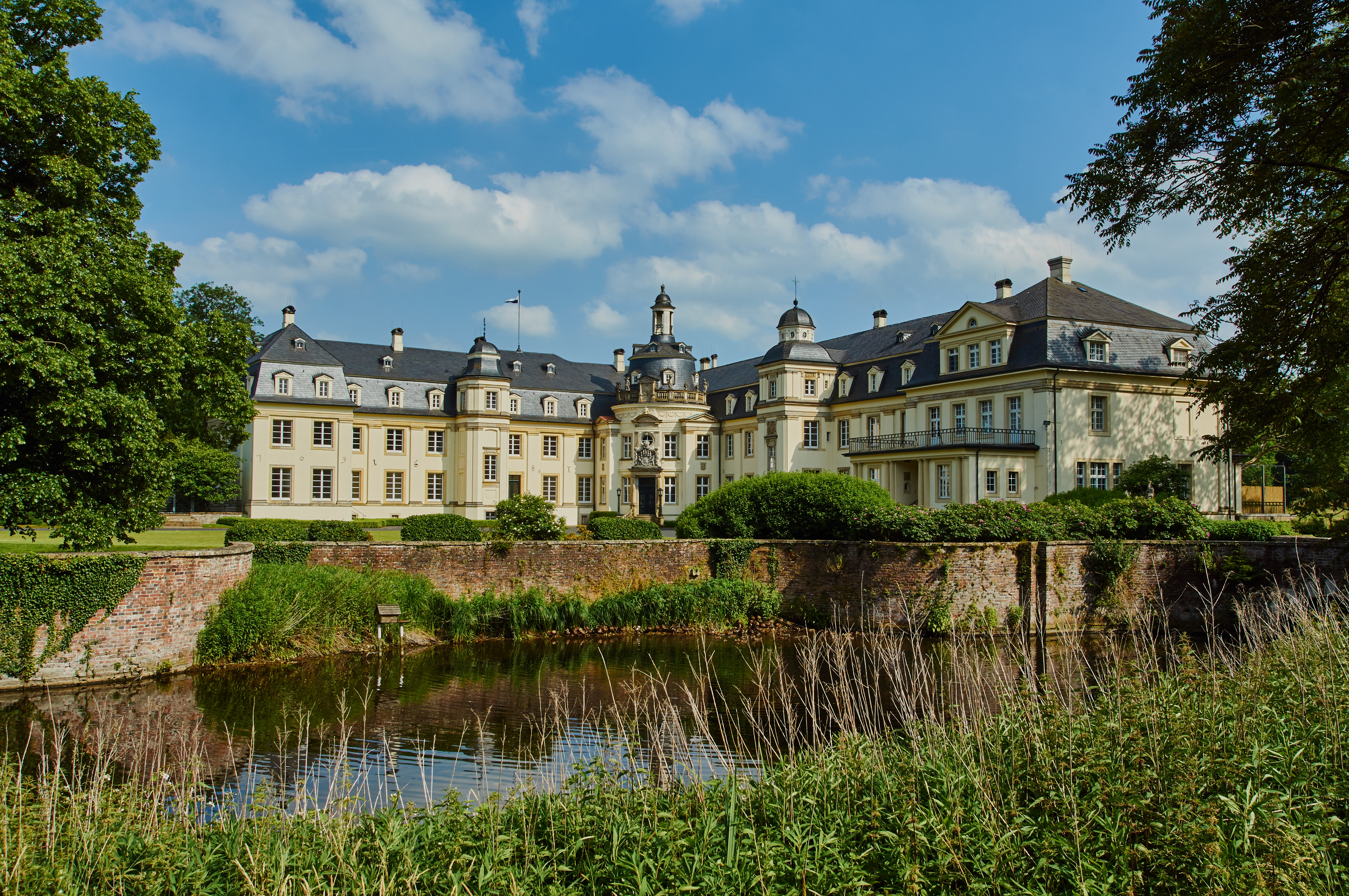
Varlar Castle

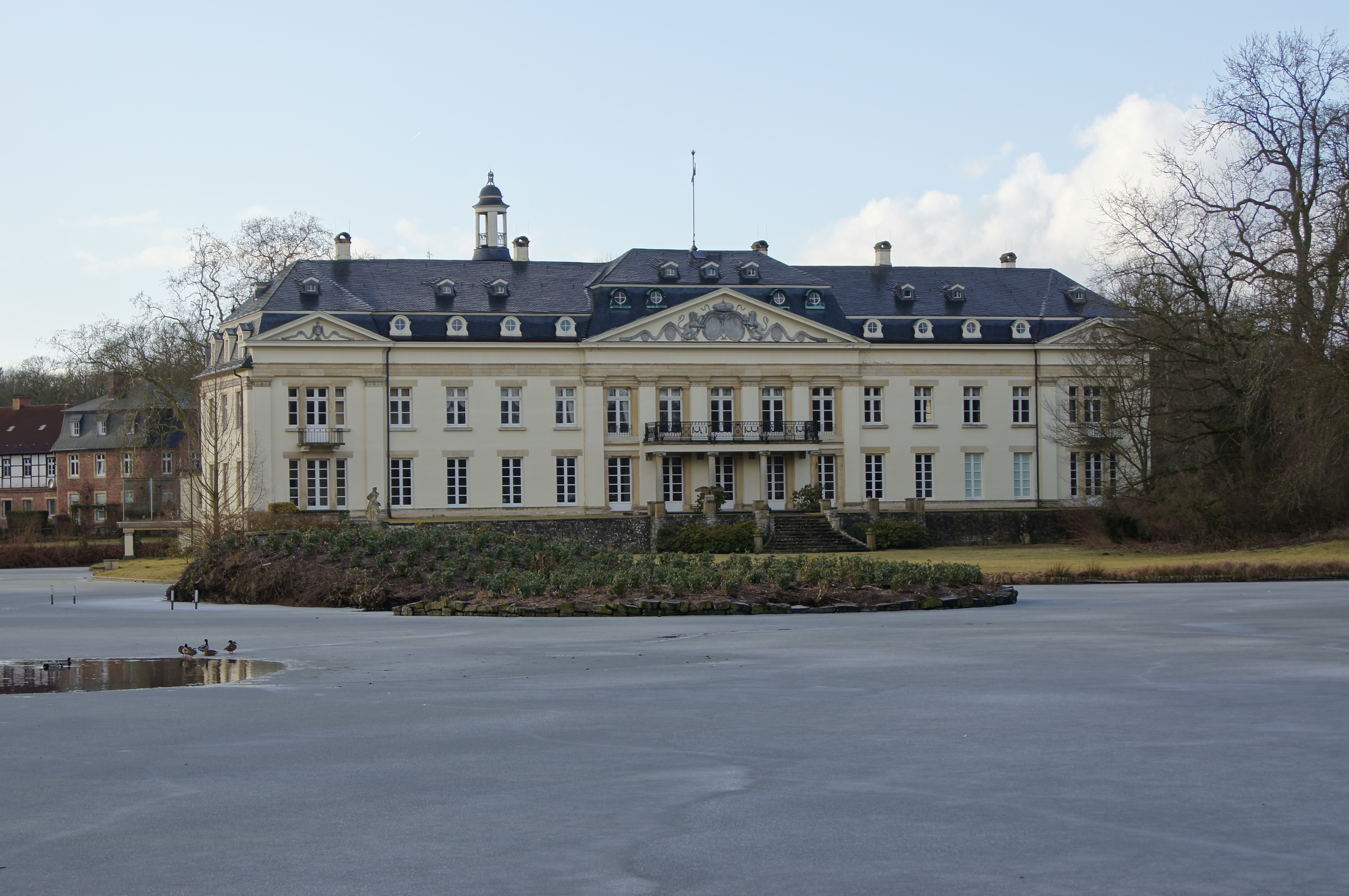
Rear view of Varlar Castle

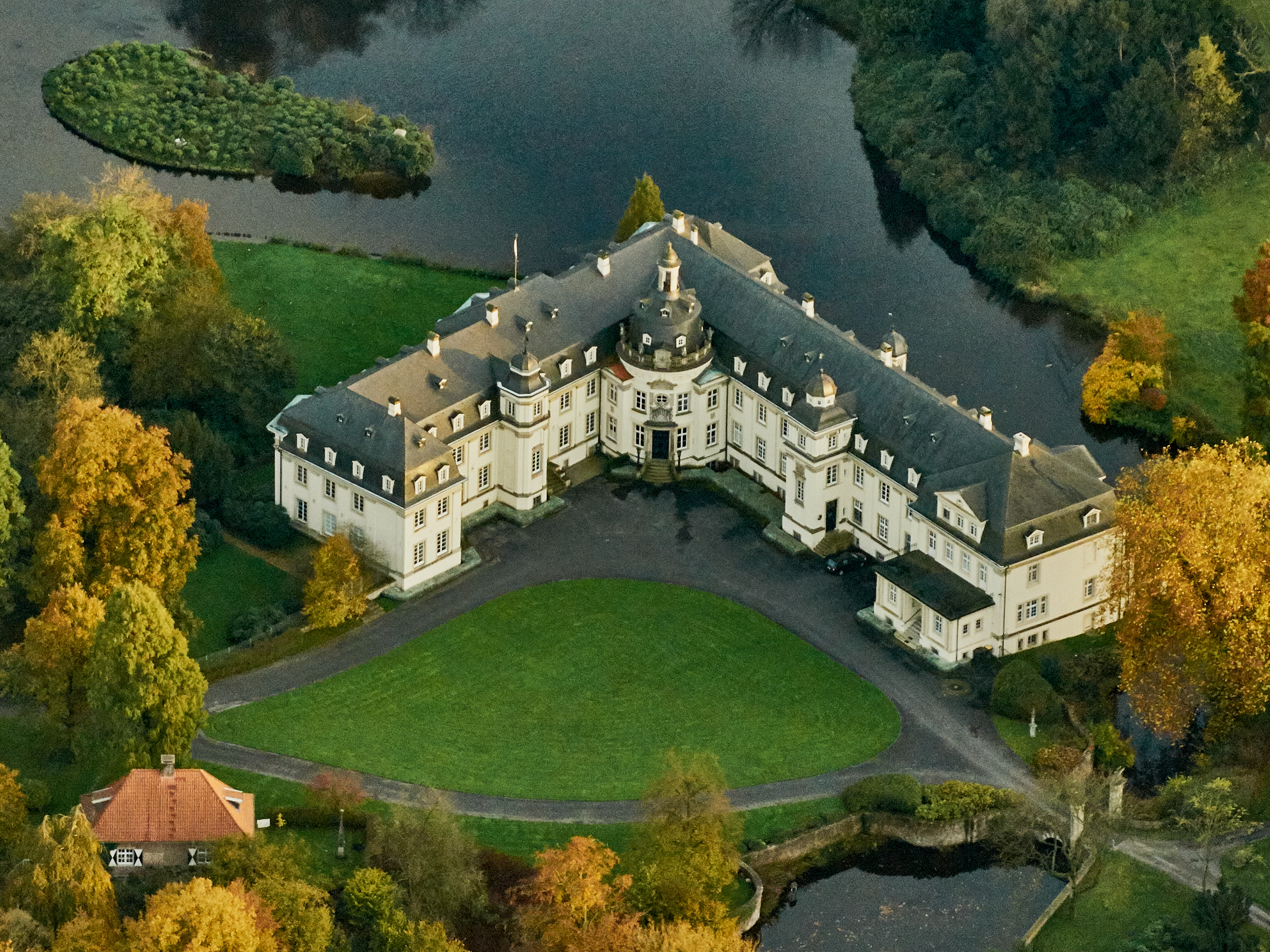
Aerial photo

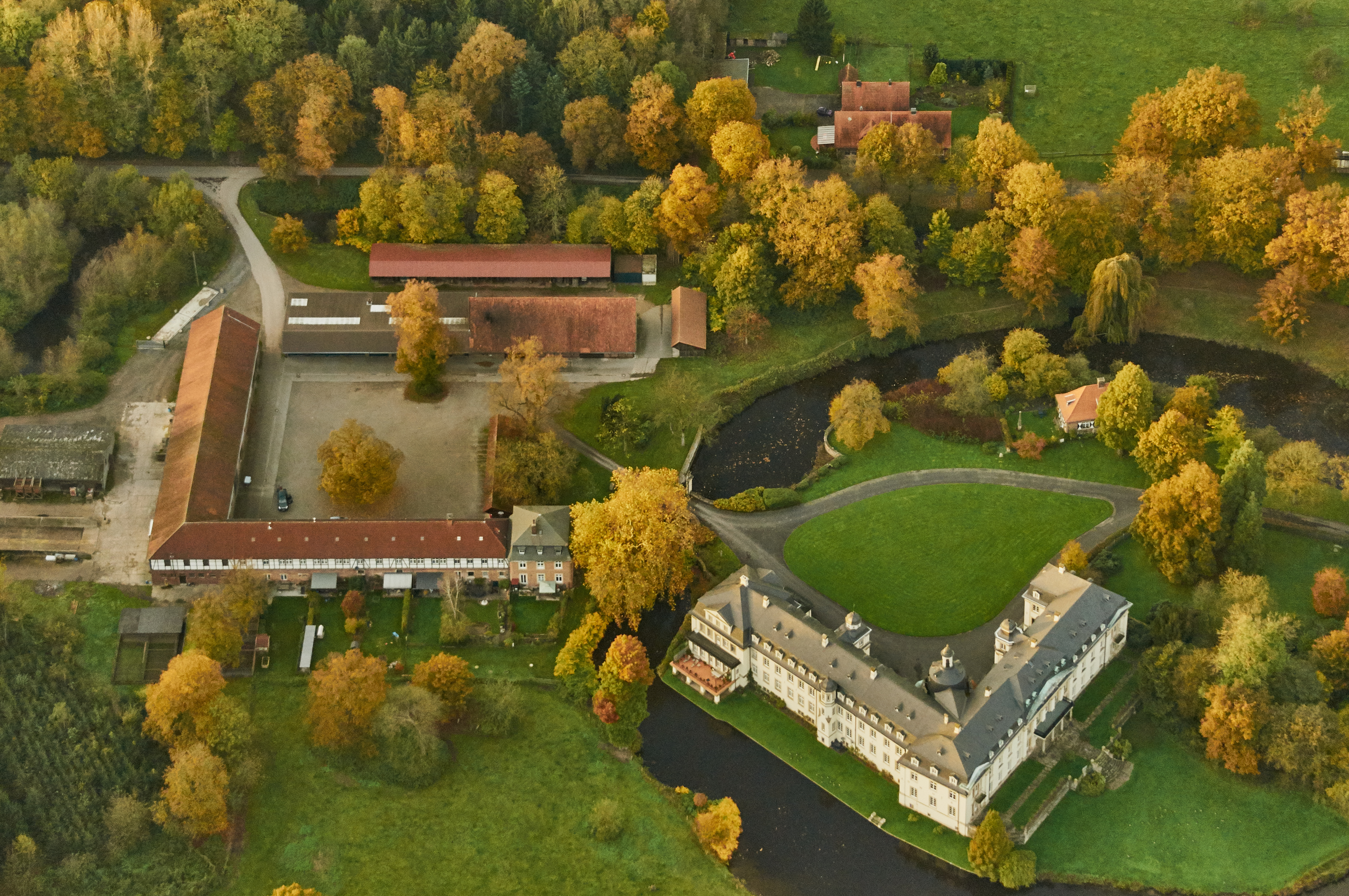
Varlar Castle with outer bailey

Varlar Castle (previously known as Varlar Abbey) is located in the Varlar farming community in the municipality of Rosendahl, North Rhine-Westphalia, Germany. Before it was used as a princely residence, it was a Premonstratensian monastery in Münsterland founded by the Counts of Cappenberg. The community there existed from around 1123/24 until secularization in 1803. Afterward, the monastery passed into the possession of the Wildgraves and Rhinegraves of Salm, who took over a large part of the extensive church property and briefly became territorial rulers.

== History ==
A main farmstead near Coesfeld in the Höven farming community has been documented since the 11th century. The farm was owned by a noblewoman named Reimod. Later, the Counts of Cappenberg owned it. Otto von Cappenberg supported Lothar von Supplinburg against Henry V. After Lothar's defeat, Otto von Cappenberg, influenced by his brother Gottfried von Cappenberg, donated most of his property to the Premonstratensian Order. The foundation was confirmed by Bishop Egbert of Münster. Whether Benedictines had previously lived in Varlar is doubtful.

=== Monastic life ===
As a community of regular Canons, the Premonstratensians of Varlar also took on pastoral duties. They looked after the parishes of Coesfeld, Lette, and Rhede, among others. The monks were also active in nursing. The processions organized by Varlar even attracted people from Holland. The Premonstratensians also introduced modern agricultural methods to the region at that time.

The initial monastic discipline declined over the centuries, and the monastery developed into a welfare institution for later-born sons of the nobility. Attempts at reform in the 16th and 17th centuries failed. In the years 1591 and 1643 the institution was severely damaged by looting and destruction.

=== Castle ===
The foundation was dissolved by the Imperial Deputation Act of 1803. The monastery complex and its property fell to the Wildgrave and Rhinegrave of Salm-Grumbach as compensation for the loss of his county on the left bank of the Rhine. The complex now served as the residence of the Count's family, which was of Protestant denomination. The short-lived independent rule ended in 1806, when the County of Salm-Horstmar was mediatized by the Act of Confederation of the Rhine (Article 24) and annexed to the new Grand Duchy of Berg.

The estates remained privately owned by the family, which now called itself Salm-Horstmar. Friedrich August Karl zu Salm-Grumbach, who had been elevated to the Prussian princely rank as Prince of Salm-Horstmar in 1816, introduced various innovations. His successor in 1865 was Otto, 2nd Prince of Salm-Horstmar. His son Otto, 3rd Prince of Salm-Horstmar, temporary president of the German Naval League and leading member of the so-called Pan-German League, took over the property in 1892. In 1919, he enabled Walther Stennes, who later became a SA leader and then an opponent of Hitler, to secretly train the volunteer corps "Freiwillige Kompanie Stennes" at Varlar Castle, from which the Freikorps Hacketau emerged.

From July 1948, the castle served as a residence for royalist Yugoslav officers, supporters of their last King, Peter II, who spent their final years in exile there with the consent of the English military government. After their departure, the Salm-Horstmar family regained the castle, represented today by Philipp-Otto, 5th Prince of Salm-Horstmar.
