= Schmemann =

Schmemann can refer to:

- Alexander Schmemann (1921–1983), Orthodox Christian priest, teacher, and writer
- Serge Schmemann (born 1945), French journalist
