= List of ship commissionings in 1941 =

The list of ship commissionings in 1941 includes a chronological list of all ships commissioned in 1941.

	Operator	Ship	Class and type	Pennant	Other notes
15 January	Kriegsmarine	U-151	Type IID coastal submarine	U-151	
19 January	Royal Navy	Prince of Wales	King George V-class battleship	53	
29 January	Kriegsmarine	U-152	Type IID coastal submarine	U-152	
25 February	Kriegsmarine	Tirpitz	Bismarck-class battleship		
9 April	United States Navy	North Carolina	North Carolina-class battleship	BB-55	
15 May	United States Navy	Washington	North Carolina-class battleship	BB-56	
2 June	United States Navy	Long Island	Long Island-class escort carrier	AVG-1	Former merchant Mormacmail
15 June	United States Navy	Wakefield	Chartered liner	AP-21	Former SS Manhattan
20 June	United States Navy	Chenango	Cimarron-class oiler	AO-31	Former merchant tanker Esso New Orleans
16 July	United States Navy	Suwannee	Cimarron-class oiler	AO-33	Former merchant tanker Markay
22 August	Luftwaffe	Max Stinsky	Karl Meyer-class seaplane tender		Completion date
30 August	Royal Canadian Navy	Haida	Tribal-class destroyer	G63	
22 September	Luftwaffe	Hans Albrecht Wedel	Hans Albrecht Wedel-class seaplane tender		Completion date
4 November	Royal Navy	Duke of York	King George V-class battleship	17	
17 November	Royal Navy	Archer	Long Island-class escort carrier	D78	Former merchant Mormacland
18 December	Luftwaffe	Immelmann	Karl Meyer-class seaplane tender		Completion date
