= Ted Ryko =

Australian cyclist and photographer

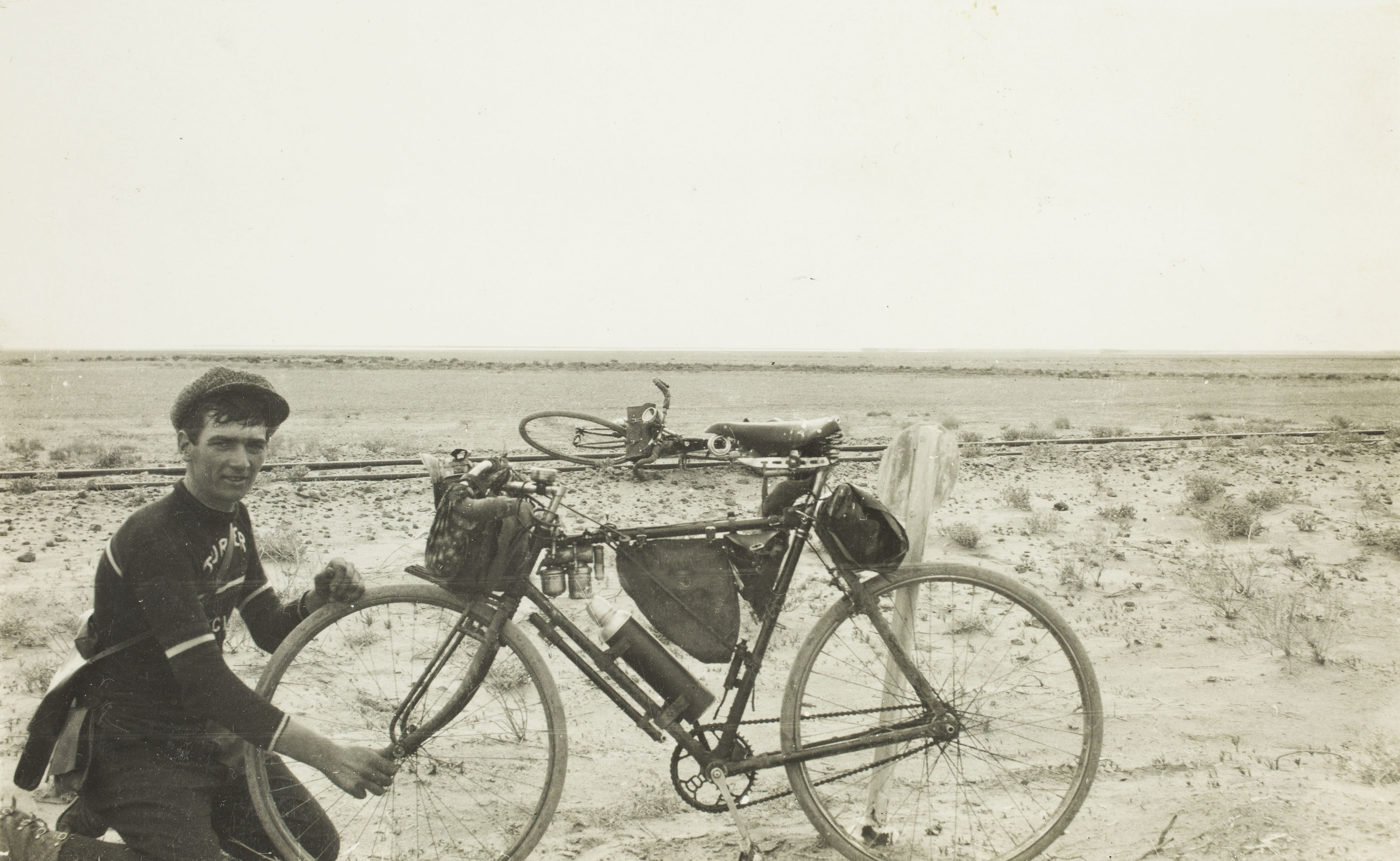
Ted Ryko on his world record breaking journey from Adelaide to Darwin in 1914.

Ted Ryko (26 September 1892 - 2 September 1968), born Edward Frederick Reichenbach, was an Australian cyclist and photographer who broke the world record for cycling from Adelaide to Darwin in May 1914.

== Early life ==
Ryko was born in Woorak, near Jeparit in the Mallee, Victoria to Ludwig Carl Reichenbach and Alma Johanna Reichenbach. His parents were of German descent but were both born in Australia.

== World Record ==
At 21 years of age, Ryko, together with companion John Fahey left the Adelaide Post Office in May 1914 determined to break the world record for cycling from Adelaide to Darwin. Even stopping to take photographs of the journey, Ryko broke the record reaching the Darwin Post Office shortly after noon on Thursday 11 June 1914. The journey took him 28 days, 15 hours and 30 minutes, beating the previous record by 15 hours and 23 minutes. Fahey sprained his ankle near the border of South Australia and the Northern Territory and was unable to complete the journey.

== Photography ==
After setting the record, Ryko opened a photography studio in Cavenagh Street in Darwin. He sold photographic postcards of which he produced over 3000, selling them for fourpence each. He traveled extensively throughout the Territory, often on bicycle photographing Indigenous people, ceremonial life and remote industries such as buffalo hunting. Many scenes were often carefully constructed. In December 1915, Ryko sold the business, to concentrate on his photography, travelling extensively across the Northern Territory throughout Arnhem Land, as well as Fort Dundas, Goulburn Island Mission and Melville Island. Ryko's bike was painted by the Warruqi people in a rock art shelter in Arnhem Land.

Ryko left the Territory in, moving to Sydney. His collection of photographs and postcards were stolen from his home. They are now extremely rare. Of the nearly 3000 photographs Ryko took during his time in the Northern Territory, only a couple of hundred remain. They are now sought after by private collectors, libraries. archives and museums.

== Later life ==
Ryko spent time at the Sydney Sanitarium in Wahroonga in New South Wales in 1919 due to mental health issues. He married Irene Watson on 20 April 1920. He worked on the Sydney Harbour Bridge construction and continued to write articles for the Sydney Morning Herald.

Ryko returned to the Northern Territory in 1940 working on the Commonwealth Railways as a fettler in Katherine and the old Ghan railway at the Finke, where he was responsible for the water pumping station. During this period he collected flora contributing more than 475 plants to the herbarium in Adelaide.

Ryko spent the last two years of his life living in Nhill, Victoria. He died on 2 September 1968. He is buried in the Woorak cemetery in Victoria.

An exhibition of his photographs was held at Northern Territory Library in Darwin in 2014.
