= Franz Joseph, Prince of Hohenlohe-Schillingsfürst =

Franz Joseph
- Prince of Hohenlohe-Schillingsfürst
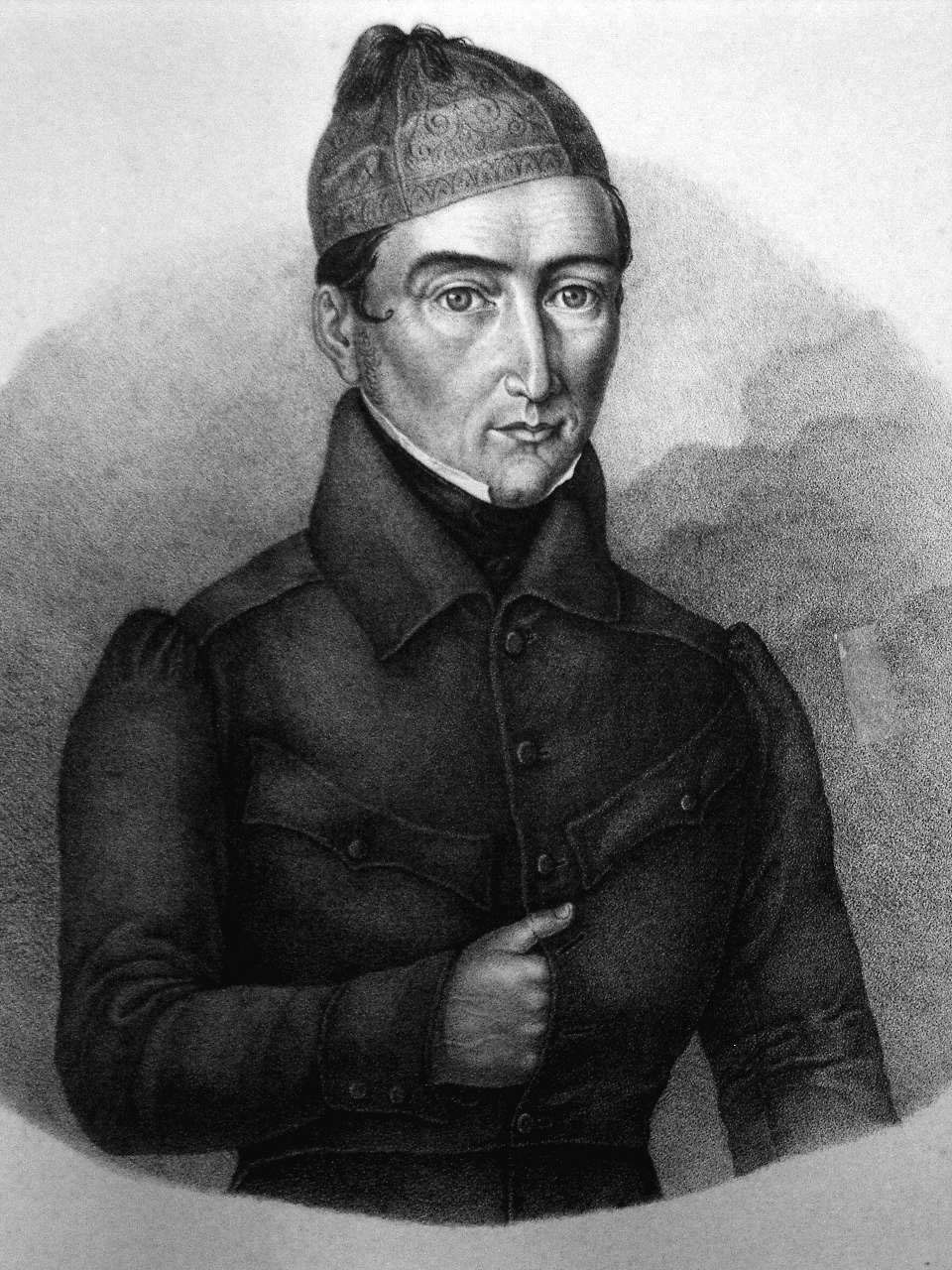
- Born: 26 November 1787; Kupferzell
- Died: 14 January 1841 (aged 53); Corvey
- Spouse: Princess Constanze of Hohenlohe-Langenburg
- Issue: Viktor I, Duke of Ratibor; Chlodwig, Prince of Hohenlohe-Schillingsfürst; Gustav Adolf, Cardinal Prince of Hohenlohe-Schillingsfürst; Prince Konstantin
Names
- German: Franz Joseph Karl Conrad
- House: Hohenlohe-Schillingsfürst
- Father: Charles Albert II, Prince of Hohenlohe-Waldenburg-Schillingsfürst
- Mother: Baroness Judith Reviczky de Revisnye

Franz Joseph Karl Conrad, Prince of Hohenlohe-Schillingsfürst (German: Franz Joseph Karl Conrad Fürst zu Hohenlohe-Schillingsfürst; 26 November 1787 – 14 January 1841) was the 1st Prince of Hohenlohe-Schillingsfürst and the founder of the branch of the Dukes of Ratibor and Princes of Corvey.

== Early life ==
Prince Franz Joseph was the tenth child and the fourth son, but second surviving, of Charles Albert II, Prince of Hohenlohe-Waldenburg-Schillingsfürst (1742–1796) by his second wife, the Hungarian Baroness Judith Reviczky de Revisnye (1751–1836). His elder brother was Charles Albert III, Prince of Hohenlohe-Waldenburg-Schillingsfürst.

His paternal grandparents were Charles Albert I, 2nd Prince of Hohenlohe-Waldenburg-Schillingsfürst and Countess Sophie Wilhelmine of Löwenstein-Wertheim-Rochefort (a daughter of Dominic Marquard, Prince of Löwenstein-Wertheim-Rochefort). His maternal grandparents were Baron Johann Kazimir Reviczky de Revisnye and Baroness Rosalie Perényi de Perény.

== Career ==
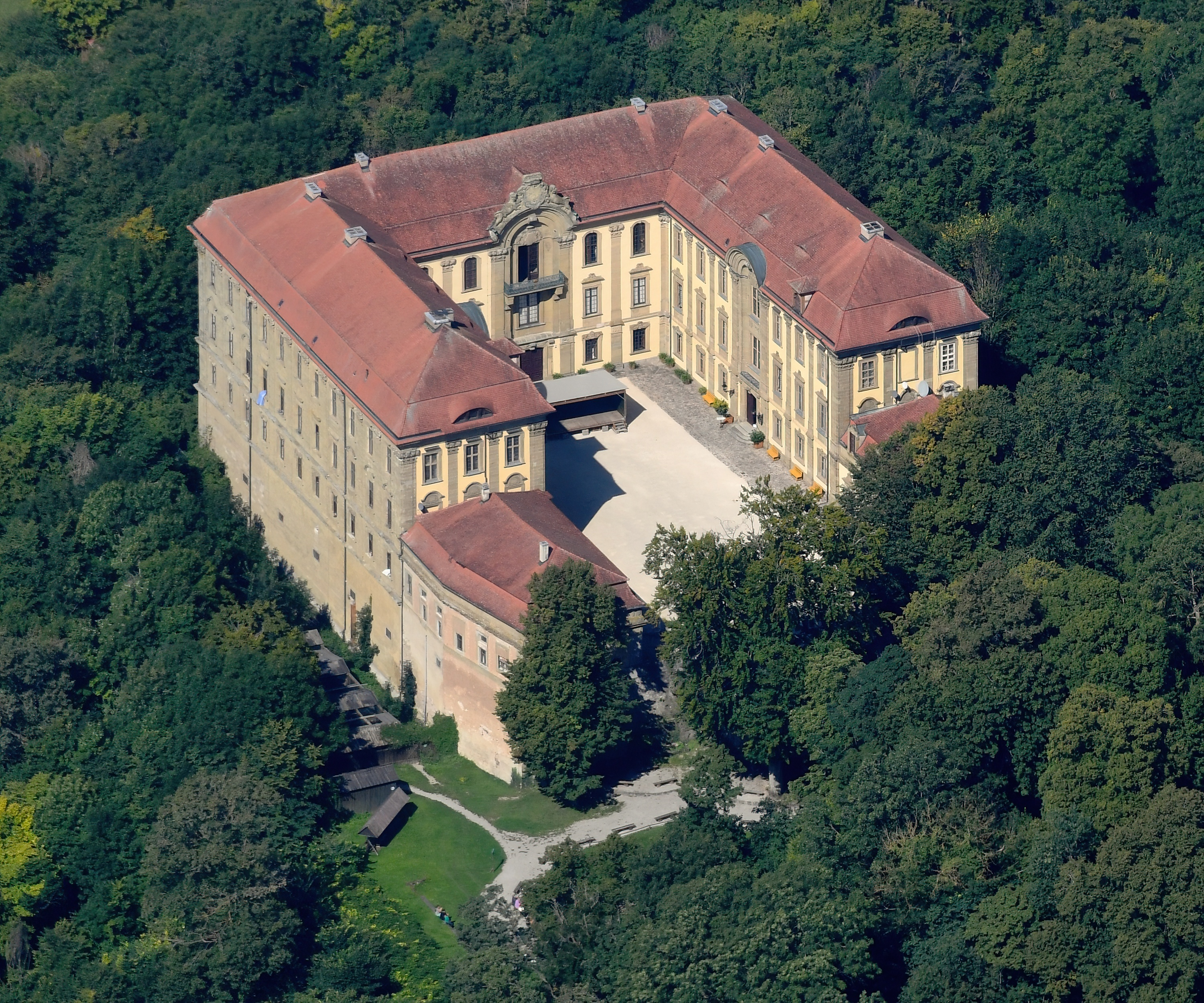
Schillingsfürst Castle

Prince Franz Joseph inherited Schillingsfürst Castle from his father, thus founding the Bavarian Schillingsfürst line of the old Franconian noble House of Hohenlohe. With the fall of the Holy Roman Empire, all of the territories of the House of Hohenlohe were mediatized and in 1806 most of them fell to the Kingdom of Württemberg and a smaller part to the Kingdom of Bavaria. Prince Franz Joseph's inheritance belonged to the part that came under Bavarian sovereignty in 1806. As a mediatized prince, however, he remained a landlord and landowner in Middle Franconia and also owned estates in Bohemia, Prussia, and Russia. As a Lord of the Manor (Standesherr), he was a member of the First Chamber of the Bavarian National Assembly ("Bayerische Ständeversammlung"), the so-called Chamber of Imperial Councillors, from 1819 to 1840. He was also a major à la suite in the Bavarian Army.

Upon the death of his brother-in-law, Victor Amadeus, Landgrave of Hesse-Rotenburg, without issue on 12 November 1834, he bequeathed his non-Hessian estates of Ratibor in Upper Silesia and Corvey to Prince Franz Joseph's eldest son, Prince Viktor of Hohenlohe-Schillingsfürst, along with his titles of Duke of Ratibor and Prince of Corvey. Thus, the entire family moved to Corvey. The property belonged next to the former monastery of Corvey in Westphalia, the rule Ratibor in Upper Silesia. This area was 34,000 ha in size and consisted mostly of forests. As Victor did not come of age until 1840, Prince Franz Joseph took over the administration of this inheritance as his son's guardian. (Note: In 1840, upon coming of age, Hereditary Prince Viktor assumed the title of Duke of Ratibor and Prince of Corvey, renouncing his claims to the Schillingsfürst inheritance. In an inheritance contract, the sons of Prince Franz initially divided the estate of their father and uncle so that Viktor received the Duchy of Ratibor, Chlodwig, as the second Lord of the Majorat with the title Prince of Ratibor and Corvey, received the Principality of Corvey, and Philipp Ernst, the Principality of Schillingsfürst. When Prince Philipp Ernst died in May 1845, Prince Chlodwig took over his father's ancestral house of Schillingsfürst in Middle Franconia and ceded the Principality of Corvey to the Duke of Ratibor. Thus, Prince Franz Joseph became the progenitor of both the Prussian House of Ratibor-Corvey and the Bavarian-Austrian House of Hohenlohe-Schillingsfürst.)

== Personal life ==
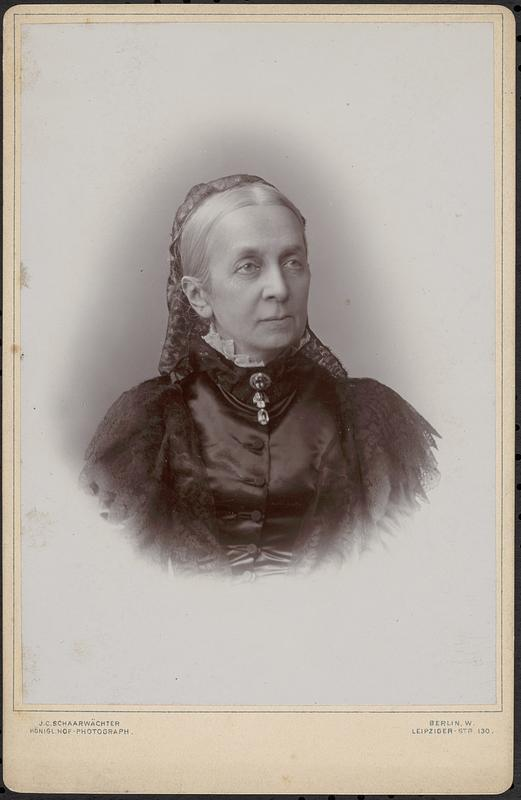
Photograph of his youngest daughter, Princess Elise of Salm-Horstmar, by Julius Schaarwächter, 1899

On 29 March 1815 in Schillingsfürst, he married Princess Caroline Friederike Constanze of Hohenlohe-Langenburg, daughter of Karl Ludwig, Prince of Hohenlohe-Langenburg and Countess Amalie Henriette of Solms-Baruth. Her sister, Princess Elisabeth of Hohenlohe-Langenburg, married Victor Amadeus, Landgrave of Hesse-Rotenburg. Together, Prince Franz Joseph and Princess Caroline were the parents of the following children:

- Princess Therese Amalie Judith of Hohenlohe-Schillingsfürst (1816–1891), who married her cousin Friedrich Karl, Prince of Hohenlohe-Waldenburg-Schillingsfürst.
- Prince Viktor Moritz Carl of Hohenlohe-Schillingsfürst (1818–1893), who became Duke of Ratibor, Prince of Corvey; he married Princess Amalie of Fürstenberg, daughter of Karl Egon II zu Fürstenberg.
- Chlodwig Carl Viktor, 3rd Prince of Hohenlohe-Schillingsfürst (1819–1901), who served as Chancellor of Germany and Prime Minister of Prussia from 1894 to 1900; he married Princess Marie of Sayn-Wittgenstein-Berleburg.
- Philipp Ernst, 2nd Prince of Hohenlohe-Schillingsfürst (1820–1845), who died unmarried.
- Princess Amalie Adelheid of Hohenlohe-Schillingsfürst (1821–1902), who married German portrait painter Richard Lauchert against the wishes of her family.
- Prince Gustav Adolf of Hohenlohe-Schillingsfürst (1823–1896), a Cardinal who was Archbishop of Edessa.
- Prince Joseph of Hohenlohe-Schillingsfürst (1824–1827), who died in infancy.
- Prince Konstantin Viktor Ernst Emil Carl Alexander Friedrich of Hohenlohe-Schillingsfürst (1828–1896), Obersthofmeister and Cavalry General in Austria-Hungary; he married Princess Marie of Sayn-Wittgenstein.
- Princess Elise Adelaide Caroline Clotilde Ferdinande of Hohenlohe-Schillingsfürst (1831–1920), who married Prince Carl of Salm-Horstmar, brother of Otto, 2nd Prince of Salm-Horstmar.

Prince Franz Joseph died at Corvey on 14 January 1841.

=== Descendants ===
Through his youngest son Konstantin, he was a grandfather of Prince Gottfried von Hohenlohe-Schillingsfürst (who married Archduchess Maria Henrietta of Austria) and Prince Konrad of Hohenlohe-Schillingsfürst (whose daughter Princess Franziska became sister-in-law the last Emperor of Austria).

== Ancestry ==
Ancestors of Franz Joseph, Prince of Hohenlohe-Schillingsfürst

16. Ludwig Gustav, Count of Hohenlohe-Waldenburg-Schillingsfurst
8. Philipp Ernst, 1st Prince of Hohenlohe-Waldenburg-Schillingsfürst
17. Countess Maria Eleonore of Hatzfeld-Gleichen
4. Charles Albert I, 2nd Prince of Hohenlohe-Waldenburg-Schillingsfürst
18. Count Philipp Karl of Oettingen-Wallerstein
9. Countess Maria Anna of Oettingen-Wallerstein
19. Countess Sophie Juliane of Oettingen-Oettingen
2. Charles Albert II, 3rd Prince of Hohenlohe-Waldenburg-Schillingsfürst
20. Maximilian Karl, Prince of Löwenstein-Wertheim-Rochefort
10. Dominic Marquard, Prince of Löwenstein-Wertheim-Rochefort
21. Maria Polyxena of Khuen-Belasi-Lichtenberg
5. Countess Sophie Wilhelmine of Löwenstein-Wertheim-Rochefort
22. Charles, Landgrave of Hesse-Wanfried
11. Landgravine Christine of Hesse-Wanfried
23. Countess Alexandrine Juliane of Leiningen-Dagsburg-Falkenburg
1. Franz Joseph, 1st Prince of Hohenlohe-Schillingsfürst
24. Mátyás Reviczky de Revisnye
12. Baron András Reviczky de Revisnye
25. Ilona Okolicsányi
6. Baron Johann Kazimir Reviczky de Revisnye
26. János Nedeczky de Nedecze
13. Julianna Nedeczky de Nedecze
27. Zsuzsanna Ordódy de Ordód et Alsólieszkó
3. Baroness Judith Reviczky de Revisnye
28. Baron Ádám Perényi de Perény
14. Baron Adám Perényi de Perény
29. Éva Pethő de Gerse
7. Baroness Rosalie Perényi de Perény
30. György IV Fráter
15. Erzsébet Fráter
31. Zsófia Balló de Diod

Franz Joseph, 1st Prince of Hohenlohe-Schillingsfürst House of Hohenlohe-Schillingsfürst Cadet branch of the House of Hohenlohe Born: 26 November 1787 Died: 14 January 1841
German nobility
Preceded by New Title	Prince of Hohenlohe-Schillingsfürst; 5 April 1807 – 14 January 1841	Succeeded by Philipp Ernst
