= Hans Imelmann =

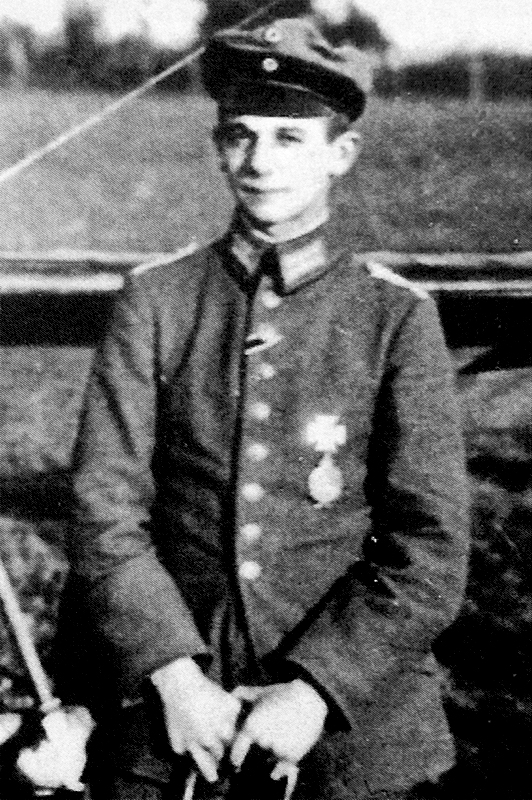
- Hans Imelmann Picture
- Born: May 14, 1897; Hannover, German Empire
- Died: 23 January 1917 (aged 19) near Miraumont, France
- Military career
- Allegiance: German Empire
- Branch: Aviation
- Rank: Leutnant
- Units: KEK Metz, Jasta 2
- Awards: Iron Cross

Leutnant Hans Imelmann (14 May 1897 – 23 January 1917) was a World War I flying ace credited with six aerial victories. As a founding member of one of Germany's original fighter squadrons, he was shot down and killed before he reached his twentieth birthday.

== Biography ==
Hans Imelmann was born in Hannover, the German Empire, on 14 May 1897.

His first known military service was as a Fokker Eindekker pilot for one of the early ad hoc fighter units, Kampfeinsitzerkommando (Combat Single-Seater Command) Metz, in 1916. He was selected by Oswald Boelcke as a pilot for Germany's new fighter squadron, Royal Prussian Jagdstaffel 2, upon its formation. Between 10 October and 20 December 1916, he was credited with six confirmed victories. Imelmann's third victory set Nieuport 17 no. A162 from No. 60 Squadron RFC aflame, but its pilot, British ace Ernest Foot somehow escaped its crash-landing uninjured.

On 23 January 1917, Imelmann became one of the first aces killed in action. Imelmann attacked a Royal Aircraft Factory BE.2c belonging to No. 4 Squadron RFC near Miraumont, France. A burst of machine gun fire through his fuel tank sent Imelmann down in flames.
