= Schimmelmann =

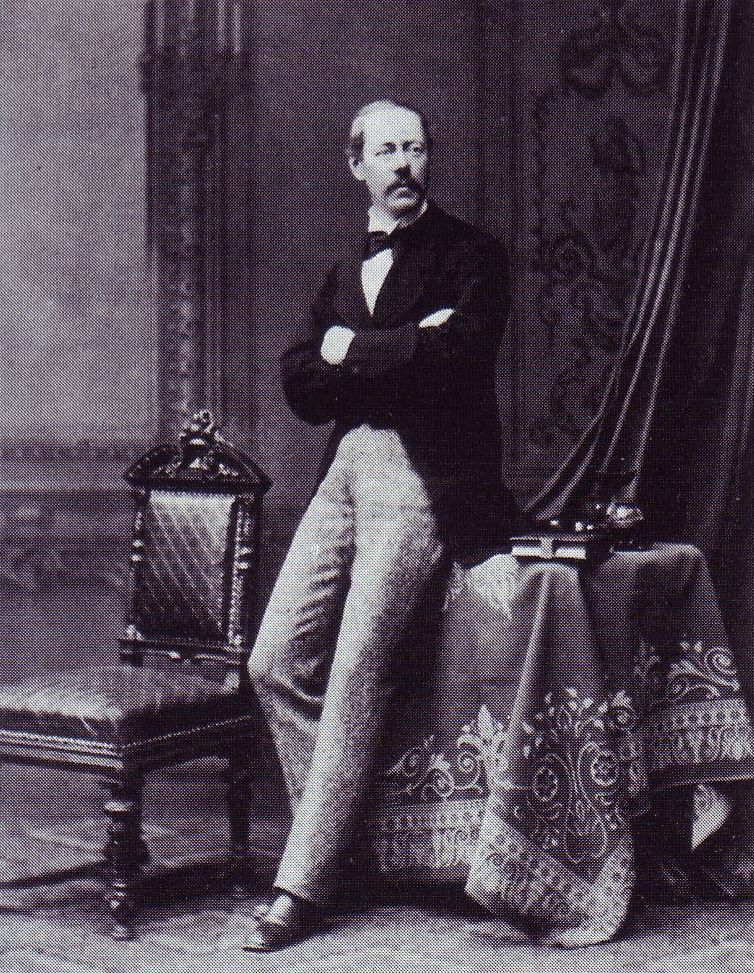
Ernst von Schimmelmann

Schimmelmann is a surname. Notable people with the surname include:

- Caroline von Schimmelmann, née Tugendreich Friedeborn (1730–1795), Danish countess
- Charlotte Schimmelmann (1757–1816), Danish noble woman and salonist
- Ernst Heinrich von Schimmelmann (1747–1831), German-Danish politician, businessman and patron of the arts
- Heinrich Carl von Schimmelmann (1724–1782), German merchant, forgerer and banker during the Seven Years' War
- Wulf von Schimmelmann (born 1947), German manager

== See also ==
- Immelmann (disambiguation)
- Schmemann (disambiguation)
