= Salm-Horstmar =

Fomer German county

Forest- and Rhine-County of Salm-Horstmar Wild- und Rheingrafschaft Salm-Horstmar
- 1803–1813
- Coat of arms
- Status: Client of the First French Empire, State of the Confederation of the Rhine
- Capital: Horstmar
- Government: Principality
- Wild- and Rhinegrave
- Historical era: Napoleonic Wars
  - Established: 1803
  - Mediatised to Prussia: 1813
  - Count Frederick given princely title in Prussia: 1816
Preceded by	Succeeded by
Bishopric of Münster / Bishopric of Münster	Kingdom of Prussia

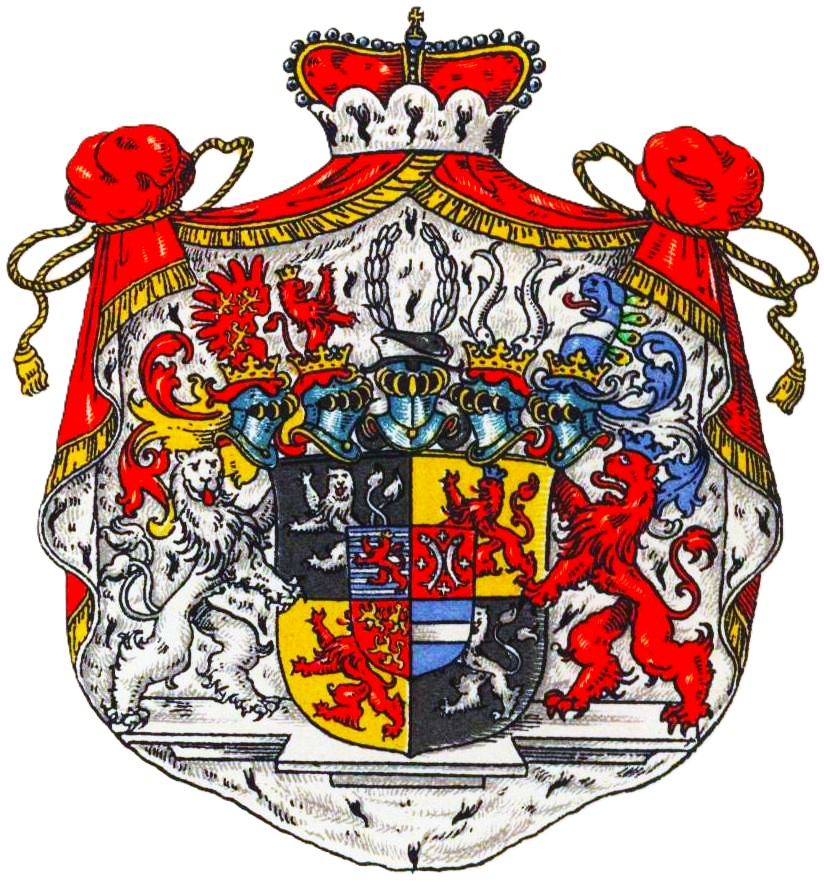
Coat of arms of the Princes of Salm-Horstmar in 1903

Salm-Horstmar was a short-lived Napoleonic County in far northern North Rhine-Westphalia, Germany, located around Horstmar, to the northeast of Münster. It was created in 1803 for Wild- and Rhinegrave Wilhelm Frederick Charles Augustus of Salm-Grumbach (1799-1865), member of an ancient German House of Salm, following the loss of Grumbach and other territories west of the Rhine to France. The county was mediatised to the Kingdom of Prussia in 1813 and the Wild- and Rhinegrave was awarded a princely title within the Kingdom of Prussia three years later, on 22 November 1816 by Frederick William III of Prussia.

== Count of Salm-Horstmar (1803–1813) ==
- Wilhelm Friedrich Charles Augustus (1803–1813)

== Princes of Salm-Horstmar (1816-present) ==
- Friedrich, 1st Prince 1816-1865 (1799-1865)
  - Prince Karl of Salm-Horstmar (1830-1909), who ceded the rights of primogeniture to his younger brother Otto on 27 March 1865.
  - Otto I, 2nd Prince 1865-1892 (1833-1892)
    - Otto II, 3rd Prince 1892-1941 (1867-1941)
      - Philipp Franz, 4th Prince 1941-1996 (1909-1996)
        - Philipp Otto, 5th Fürst 1996–2025 (born 1938)
          - Philipp, Fürst of Salm-Horstmar 2025-present (born 1973)
          - Prince Christian of Salm-Horstmar (born 1975)
        - Prince Gustav Friedrich of Salm-Horstmar (born 1942)
          - Prince Maximilian of Salm-Horstmar (born 1979)
          - Prince Leopold of Salm-Horstmar (born 1982)
        - Prince Johann Christof of Salm-Horstmar (born 1949)
        - Prince Carlos Federico of Salm-Horstmar (born 1965)
          - Prince Constantin of Salm-Horstmar (born 1994)
          - Prince Adrian of Salm-Horstmar (born 1996)

== Bibliography ==
- Alfred Bruns: Fürstentum Salm-Horstmar in: Gerhard Taddey: Lexikon der Deutschen Geschichte, Stuttgart, 1998, S. 1104f. Digitalisat
- Gerhard Köbler: Historisches Lexikon der Deutschen Länder. 7.Aufl. München, 2007 S.302 S.605
- Wilhelm Kohl: Das Bistum Münster: Die Diözese 4. Berlin, New York, 2004 (Germania Sacra NF 37,4) S.231ff.
- Wilhelm Kohl: Das Bistum Münster: Die Diözese 1 Berlin, New York, 1999 (Germania Sacra NF 37,7) S.573-576
