= Horstmar =

- Town
- Flag Coat of arms

- Location of Horstmar within Steinfurt district
- Interactive map of Horstmar
- Location within Germany Location within North Rhine-Westphalia
- Coordinates: 52°04′50″N 7°18′30″E
- Country: Germany
- State: North Rhine-Westphalia
- Admin. region: Münster
- District: Steinfurt

Government
  - Mayor (2020–25): Robert Wenking (CDU)

Area
  - Total: 44.76 km^{2} (17.28 sq mi)
- Elevation: 77 m (253 ft)

Population (2025-12-31)
  - Total: 7,428
  - Density: 166.0/km^{2} (429.8/sq mi)
- Time zone: UTC+01:00 (CET)
  - Summer (DST): UTC+02:00 (CEST)
- Postal codes: 48612
- Dialling codes: 02558
- Vehicle registration: ST
- Website: www.horstmar.de

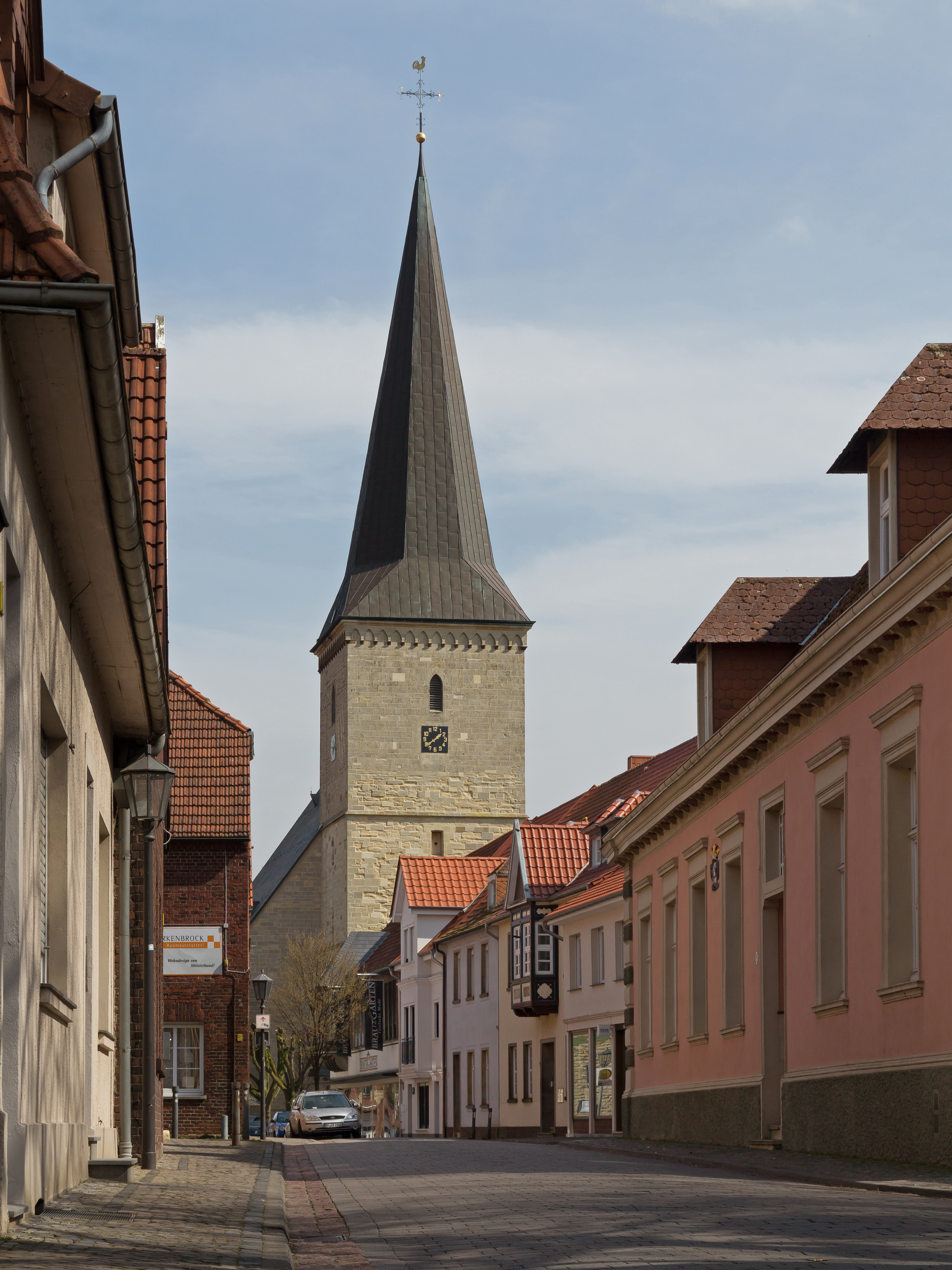
Street view of Saint Gertrude Church

Horstmar (German pronunciation: [ˈhɔʁstmaʁ]; Low German: Huorsmer) is a German town, located in North Rhine-Westphalia in the Steinfurt district, approx. 25 km (16 mi) north-west of Münster.

== History ==
Its castle was built as early as the 9th century; the first mention of Horstmar is as early as the early 11th century. The city of Horstmar was built to the south of this castle. During the Thirty Years' War the castle was destroyed by order of the Hessian lieutenant Carl von Rabenhaupt.

== Population ==
Historical population

Year	Pop.	±% p.a.
1965	5,433	—
1970	6,002	+2.01%
1975	6,126	+0.41%
1980	6,046	−0.26%
1985	6,029	−0.06%
1990	6,040	+0.04%
1995	6,387	+1.12%

Year	Pop.	±% p.a.
2000	6,695	+0.95%
2005	6,782	+0.26%
2010	6,515	−0.80%
2015	6,447	−0.21%
2020	6,595	+0.45%
2025	7,428	+2.41%

Source: Landesdatabank Nordrhein-Westfalen

== Politics ==
The city council consists of 22 councillors and the mayor.

== People from Horstmar ==
- Clemens Freiherr von Schorlemer-Lieser (1856-1922), German politician
