= Solms-Rödelheim-Assenheim =

European polity

County of Solms-Rödelheim-Assenheim Grafschaft Solms-Rödelheim-Assenheim
- 1635–1699; 1722–1728; 1778–1806
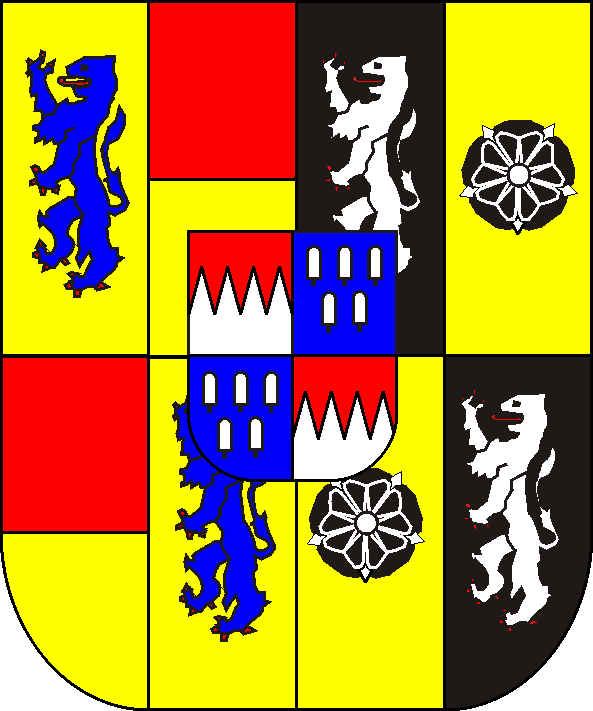
- Coat of arms
- Status: State of the Holy Roman Empire
- Capital: Rödelheim
- Government: Principality
- Historical era: Middle Ages
  - Union of S-Rödelheim and S-Assenheim: 1635
  - Repartitioned in twain: 1699
  - Reunited: 1722
  - Repartitioned: 1728
  - Reunited: 1778
  - Mediatised to Hesse- -Kassel and -Darmstadt: 1806
| Preceded by | Succeeded by |
| Solms-Assenheim; Solms-Rödelheim | Grand Duchy of Hesse; Landgraviate of Hesse-Kassel |

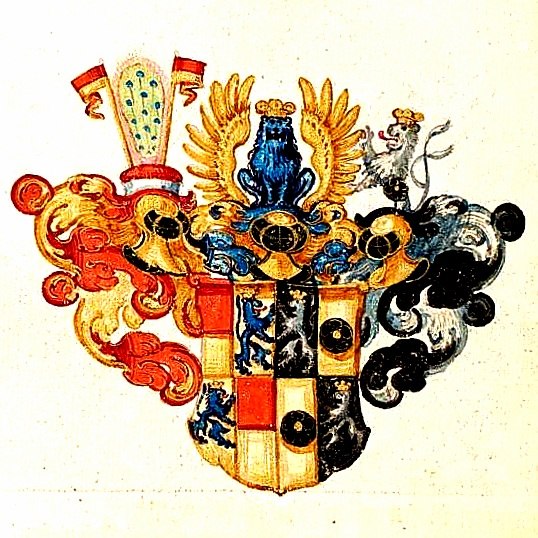
Solms-Rödelheim-Assenheim coat of arms

Solms-Rödelheim-Assenheim was a County of southern Hesse and eastern Rhineland-Palatinate, Germany. The House of Solms had its origins at Solms, Hesse.

Solms-Rödelheim-Assenheim was thrice created by a union of the Counts of Solms-Assenheim and Solms-Rödelheim, and on the first two occasions repartitioned into those statelets. Solms-Rödelheim-Assenheim was mediatised to Hesse-Kassel (or Hesse-Cassel) and Hesse-Darmstadt in 1806.

== Counts of Solms-Rödelheim-Assenheim ==
=== First creation: 1635–1699 ===
- Johann August, Count 1635–1680 (1623-1680), second son of Johann Georg II, Count of Solms-Baruth
  - Johann Karl Eberhard, Count 1680–1699 (1657-1699), eldest surviving son

=== Second creation: 1722–28 ===
Ludwig Heinrich, Count 1722-1728 (1667-1728), third surviving son of Johann August, inherited Assenheim 1699, Rödelheim 1722

=== Third creation: 1778–1806 ===
- Johann Ernst Karl, Count 1778–90 (1714-1790), second surviving son of Ludwig Heinrich, inherited elder brother's territories 1778
  - Volrath Franz Karl Ludwig, Count 1790–1818 (1762-1818), mediatized 1806

=== After Mediatization ===
- Volrath Franz Karl Ludwig, Count 1790–1818 (1762-1818), mediatized 1806
  - Karl, Count 1818-1844 (1790-1844)
    - Maximilian, Count 1844-1892 (1826-1892)
      - Karl Franz, Count 1892-1923 (1864-1923)
        - Maximilian, Count 1923-1968 (1893-1968)
          - Markwart, Count 1968-1976 (1925-1976), adopted Nikolaus as his successor
        - Count Joachim Ernst of Solms-Rödelheim-Assenheim (1896-1978)
          - Count Günther Wolfgang of Solms-Rödelheim-Assenheim (1931-1979)
            - Nikolaus, Count 1979-1981 (1961-1981)
            - Philipp, Count 1981–present (born 1964)
              - Theodor, Hereditary Count (born 2010)

== Properties ==
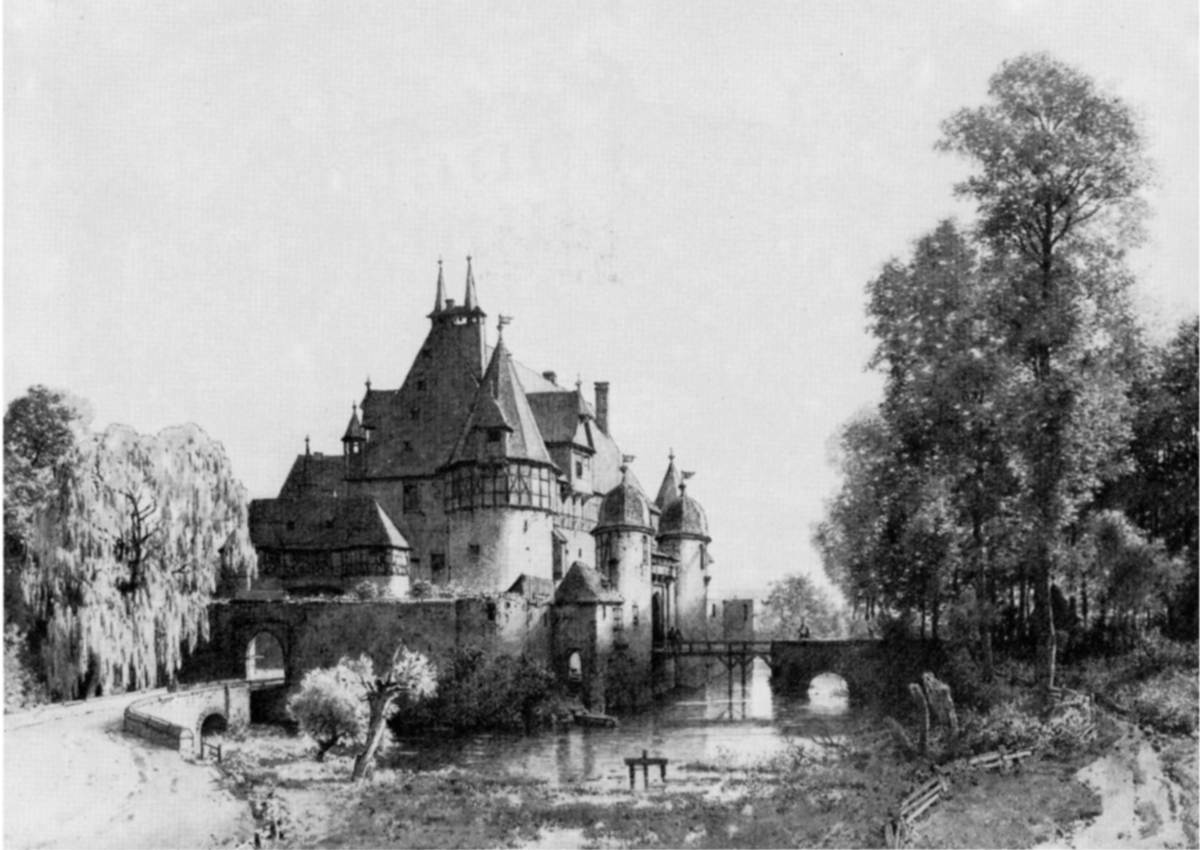
Old Rödelheim castle

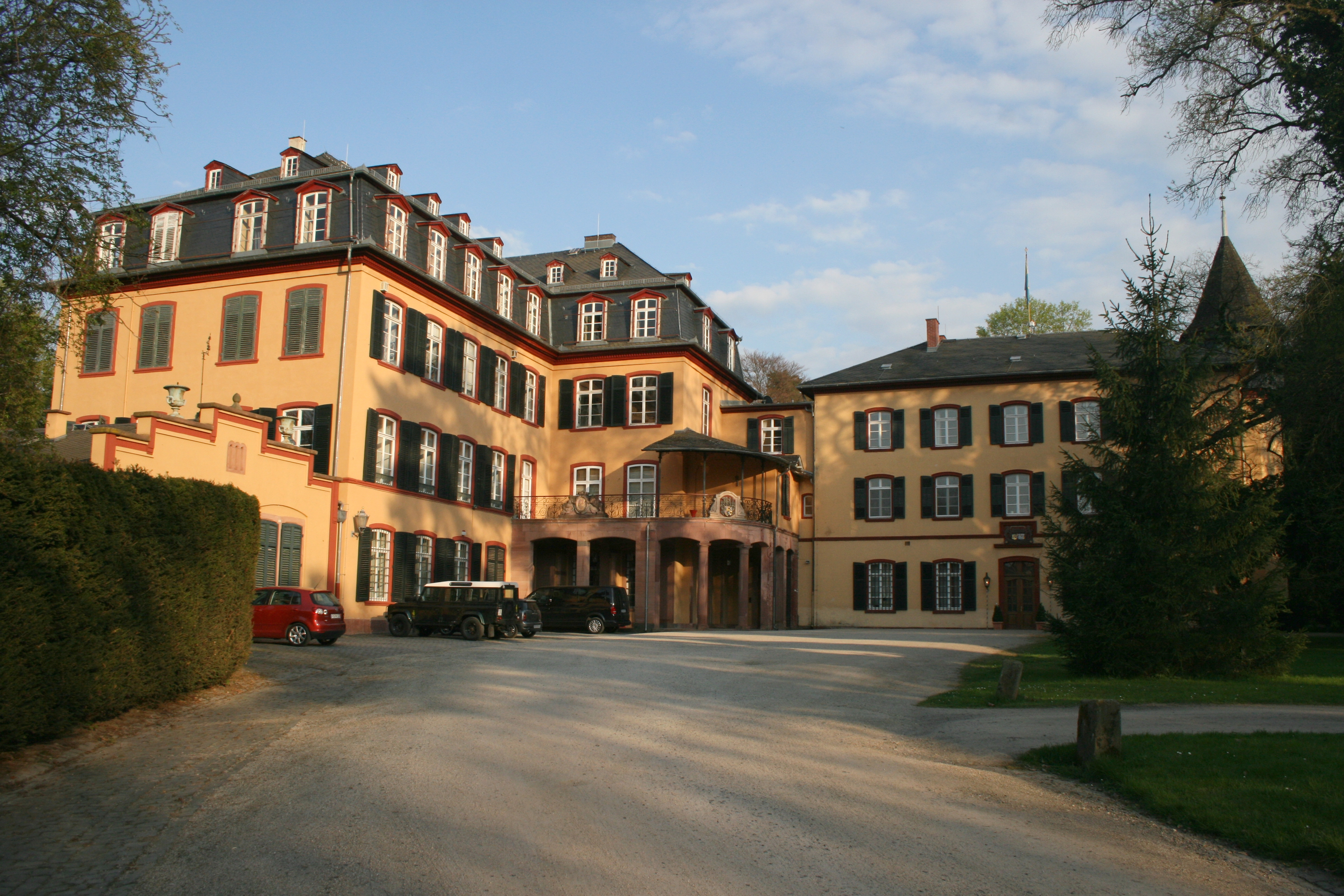
Assenheim Castle
