= Laubach =

- Town
- Coat of arms

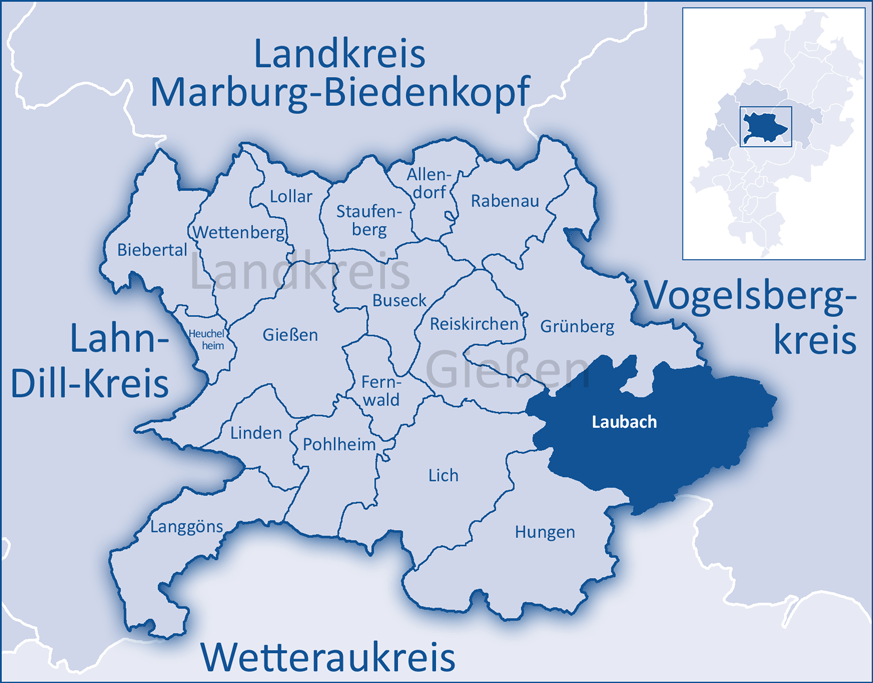
- Location of Laubach within Gießen district
- Interactive map of Laubach
- Location within Germany Location within Hesse
- Coordinates: 50°32′N 08°59.4′E
- Country: Germany
- State: Hesse
- Admin. region: Gießen
- District: Gießen

Government
  - Mayor (2020–26): Matthias Meyer (Ind.)

Area
  - Total: 97.01 km^{2} (37.46 sq mi)
- Elevation: 230–535 m (755–1,755 ft)

Population (2025-12-31)
  - Total: 9,680
  - Density: 99.8/km^{2} (258/sq mi)
- Time zone: UTC+01:00 (CET)
  - Summer (DST): UTC+02:00 (CEST)
- Postal codes: 35321
- Dialling codes: 06405
- Vehicle registration: GI
- Website: www.laubach-online.de

Laubach (German pronunciation: [ˈlaʊbax]) is a town of approximately 10,000 people in the Gießen region of Hesse, Germany. Laubach is known as a Luftkurort, a climatic health resort. It is situated 23 kilometres (14 mi) east of Gießen. Surrounding Laubach are the towns of Hungen, Grünberg, Schotten and Lich.

== Points of interest ==
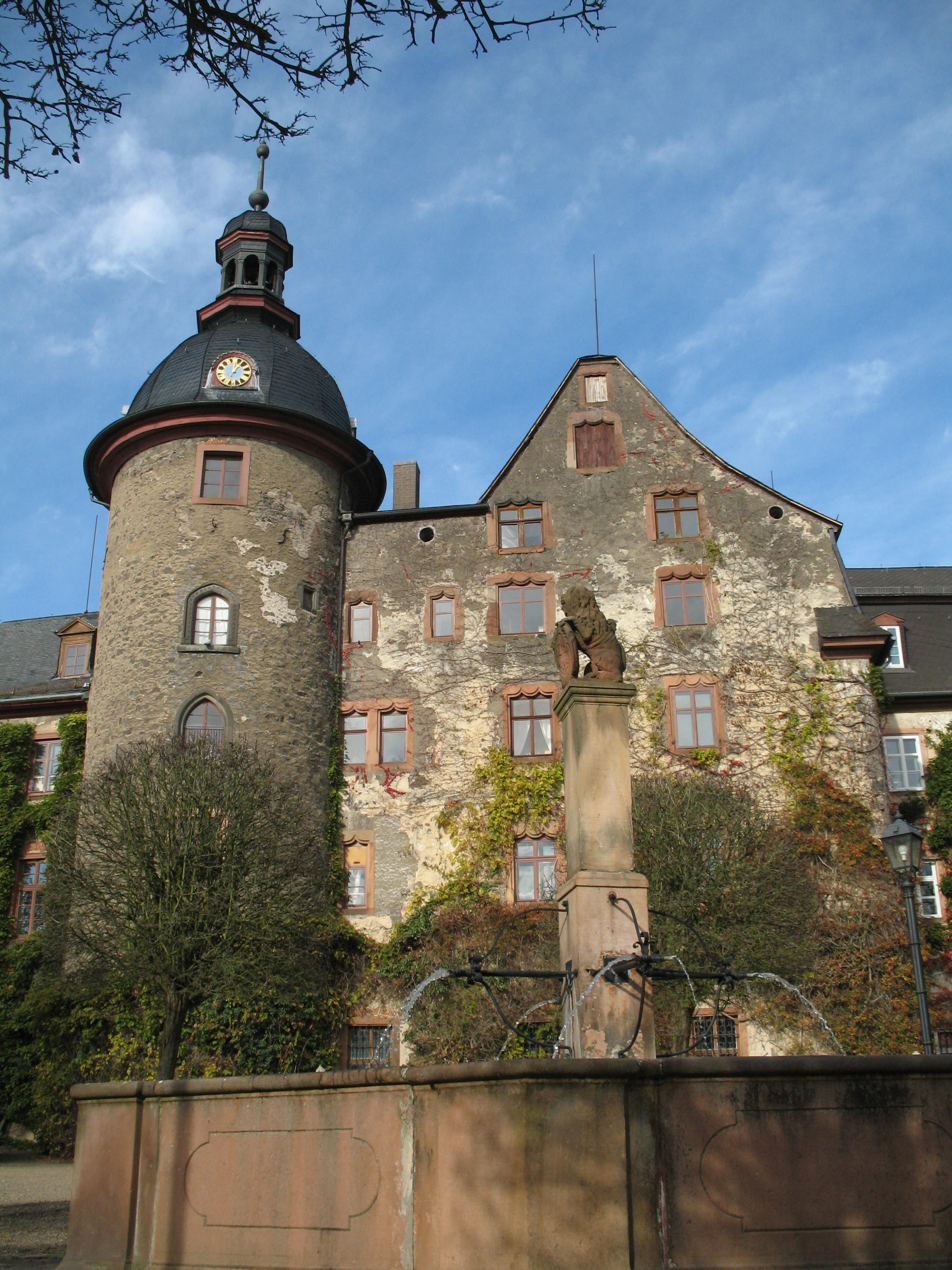
Laubach Castle

The dense Laubach Woods spread into the foothills of the Vogelsberg Mountains. With its many historic and colorful half-timbered (fachwerk) buildings, Laubach is an area of interest to tourists.

The main point of attraction is the castle, which is still owned by the count of Solms-Laubach. It was built in the thirteenth century and expanded over the years. The Solms castle has one of the largest private libraries in Europe, with over 120,000 titles. An original Gutenberg Bible, on display in the Johann Gutenberg Museum in Mainz, came from this private collection. The castle grounds include a huge park with a swan lake, open to the public.

The city's Evangelical Lutheran Church, formerly named St. Maria, has a Baroque organ. The oldest part of the church was built in the twelfth century. It was renovated in the eighteenth century.

The former district courthouse (Amtsgericht), the city hall, and the Heimat Museum are together on the main street of Friedrichstrasse. The courthouse is now a residence for senior citizens.

The Heimat Museum–Fridericianum is the local history museum, originally built near the town of Gonterskirchen in 1750 by Count August Solms-Laubach. The building was moved to its present location in 1832 and served as a school before it became a museum. The museum contains a permanent exhibit of the diary of city resident Friedrich Kellner.

== Notable residents ==
- Friedrich Kellner (1885–1970) - Laubach's chief justice inspector during World War II, he wrote a 10-volume diary about the misdeeds of the Nazis, later published as a book, My Opposition (German: Mein Widerstand). He became deputy mayor, first town councilman, and chairman of the regional branch of the Social Democrats. A Canadian documentary about Kellner was filmed on location in Laubach.
- Felix Klipstein (1880–1941), artist - grew up in Laubach and Belgium, spending his academic years in France and Spain, where he did special studies in Velázquez. In 1909 he settled in Laubach with his wife, the writer Edith Blass.
- Friedel Münch (1927–2014), head of Münch Motorcycle Works
- Philipp Erasmus Reich (1717–1787), bookseller and publisher
- Georg Friedrich Solms-Laubach (1899–1969)
- Sophie von Solms-Laubach (1594–1651)
- Countess Monika zu Solms-Laubach (1929–2015), Princess Consort of Hanover
- Fredericka Charlotte of Stolberg-Gedern (1686–1739), Countess of Solms-Laubach

== Laubach in the media ==
=== Literature ===
- Nachtigall, Helmut (1975). Die Fachwerkhäuser Alt-Laubachs: Führer durch die Holzarchitektur Alt-Laubachs. Laubach.

=== Film ===
- My Opposition: The Diaries of Friedrich Kellner. Toronto, Canada: CCI Entertainment.

== Politics ==
=== City Council ===
The municipal election on 14 March 2021 produced the following result, compared with previous municipal elections:

Parties and voter associations		2021		2016		2011		2006		2001	
Parties and voter associations		%	Seats	%	Seats	%	Seats	%	Seats	%	Seats
FW	Freie Wähler Laubach	28.7	9	31.9	10	31.3	12	25.6	10	17.4	6
CDU	Christian Democratic Union of Germany	21.7	7	21.8	7	22.4	8	27.4	10	30.3	11
SPD	Social Democratic Party of Germany	20.2	6	20.3	6	23.0	9	29.7	11	34.4	13
Grüne	Alliance 90/The Greens	15.0	4	9.2	3	13.3	5	7.9	3	9.8	4
FBLL	Freie Bürgerliste Laubach	5.7	2	7.6	2	—	—	—	—	—	—
FDP	Free Democratic Party	5.6	2	4.4	1	3.7	1	6.6	2	8.1	3
BfL	Bürger für Laubach	2.9	1	4.8	2	6.2	2	2.7	1	—	—
Total		100.0	37	100.0	37	100.0	37	100.0	37	100.0	37
Voter turnout (%)		50.4		52.1		47.0		46.6		54.2	

The chairman of the city council is Joachim M. Kühn of Freie Wähler Laubach.

=== Mayor ===
Under the Hessian Municipal Code, the mayor is elected for a six-year term, and since 1993 by direct election. The mayor chairs the Magistrat, the municipal executive body, which in Laubach comprises, in addition to the mayor, one honorary First Town Councillor and nine further town councillors. Since 1 June 2021, the mayor has been the independent politician Matthias Meyer. He was elected as the successor to Peter Klug, who did not stand for re-election after two terms, on 20 December 2020 in a run-off election with a voter turnout of 56.7 per cent, receiving 55.5 per cent of the vote.

Terms of office of the mayors

- 2021–2027 Matthias Meyer
- 2009–2021 Peter Klug
- 1991–2009 Claus Spandau (CDU)

=== Local councils ===
Each district (Ortsbezirk) of Laubach, as well as the town centre, has its own local council (Ortsbeirat) and district head (Ortsvorsteher), formed in accordance with §§ 81 and 82 of the Hessian Municipal Code (HGO). The districts are delineated by the territory of the former municipalities and each council consists of nine members. Local council elections take place as part of the general municipal elections. The local council elects one of its members as district head.

=== Laubach Local Council (town centre) ===
At the 2021 Hessian local elections, voter turnout for the local council election was 45.24%. The following were elected: one member each from the CDU, Alliance 90/The Greens, the FDP, and the "Freie Jungwähler" (FJW); two members from the SPD; and three members from the Freie Wähler (FW). The local council elected Günter Haas (FW) as district head.

=== Coat of arms ===
The coat of arms shows a lion in alternating gold and blue on a field divided horizontally between gold and blue. The right to bear the arms was granted to the town of Laubach by the Hessian Minister of the Interior on 8 May 1952.

== Twin towns ==
Laubach is twinned with:

- Élancourt, France (approximately 40 kilometres southwest of Paris), since 1975
- Gräfenhainichen, Saxony-Anhalt, Germany, since 1995
- Zoersel, Belgium, since 1995
- Didim, Turkey, since 1996

== Gallery ==
Sheep grazing, a part of Laubach's landscape

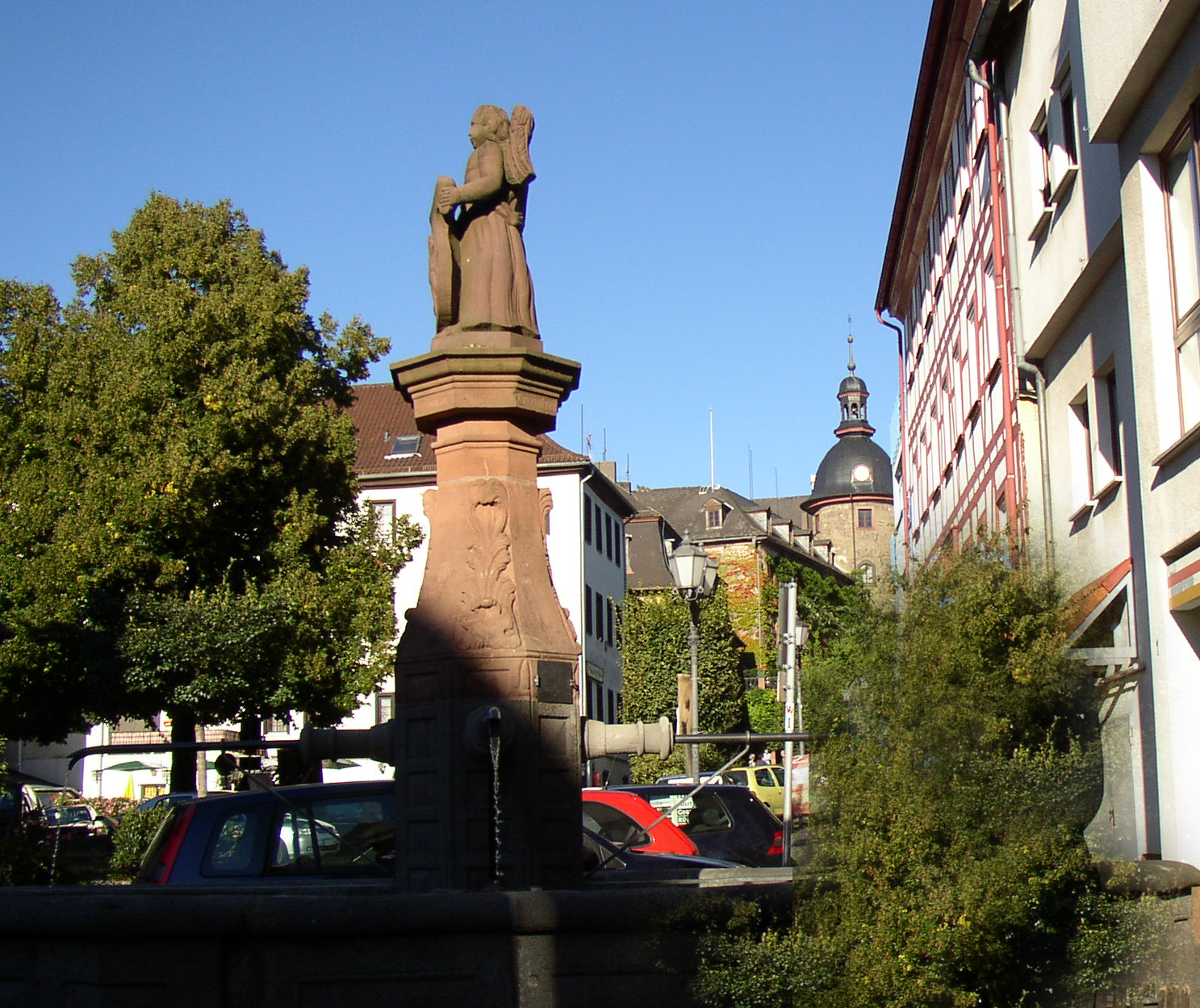
Solms Castle and Laubach houses

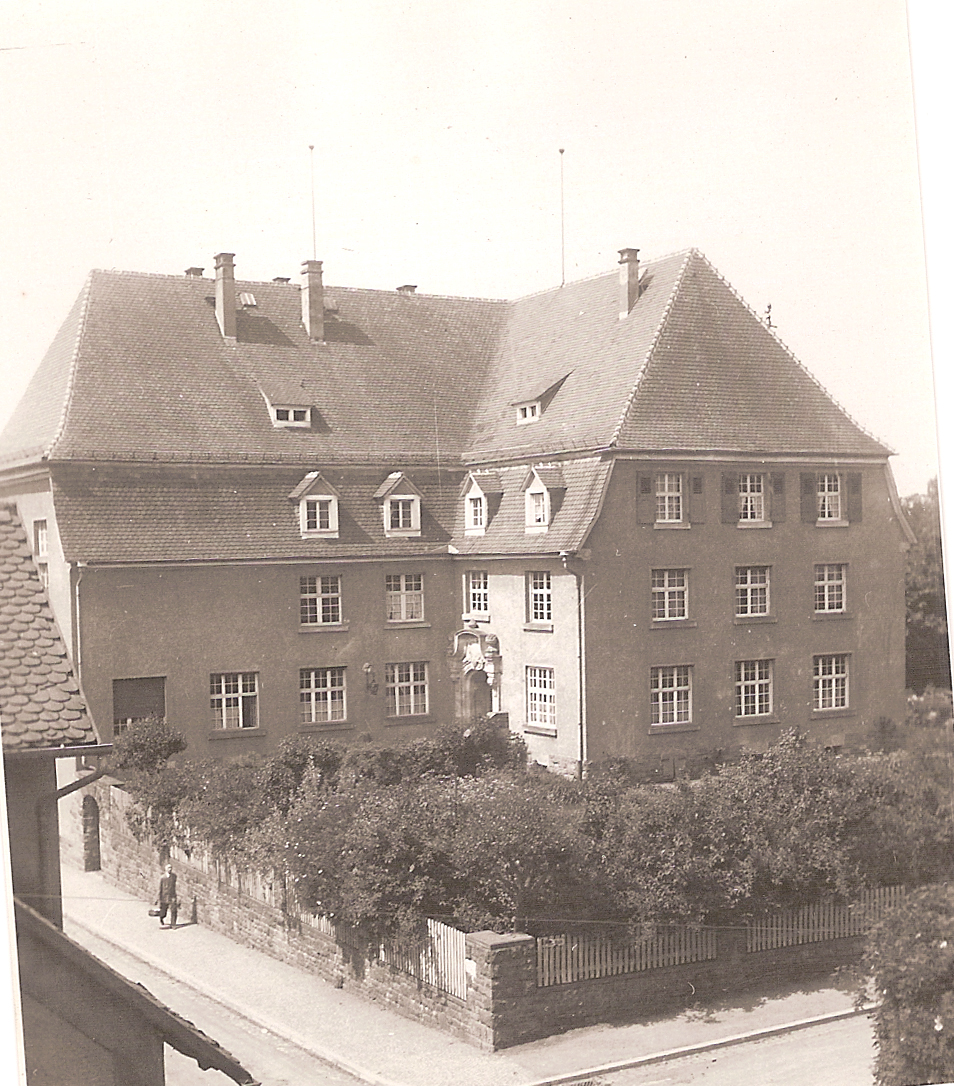
Laubach courthouse (Amtsgericht) in 1938

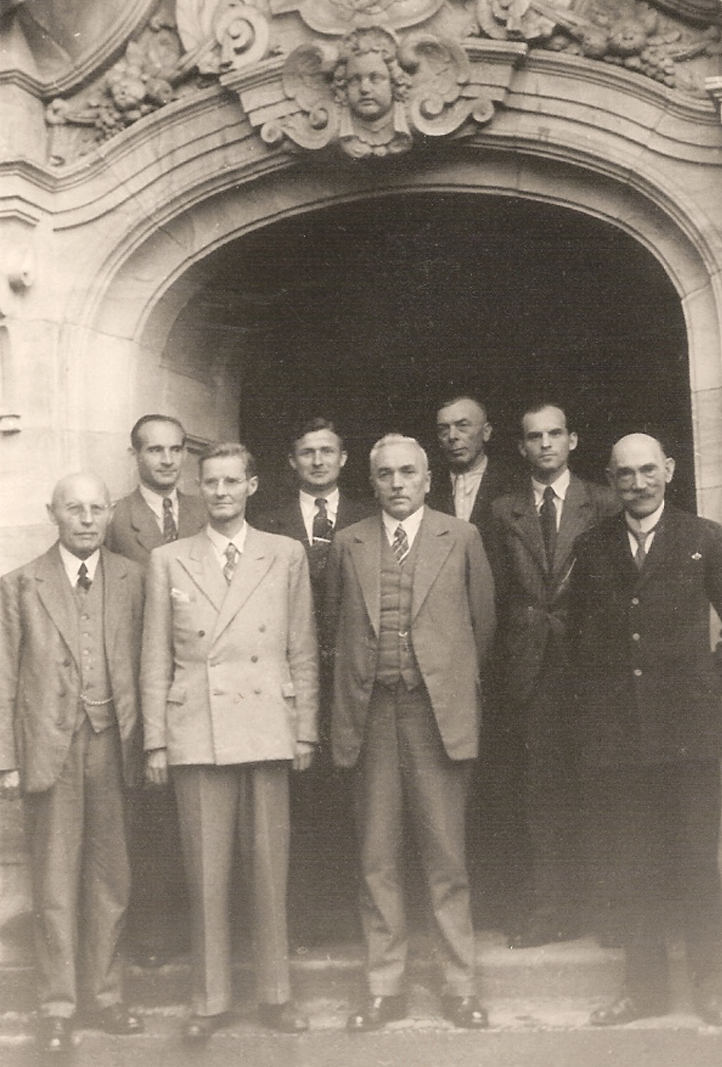
Chief Justice Inspector Friedrich Kellner (center), at the Laubach courthouse in 1948

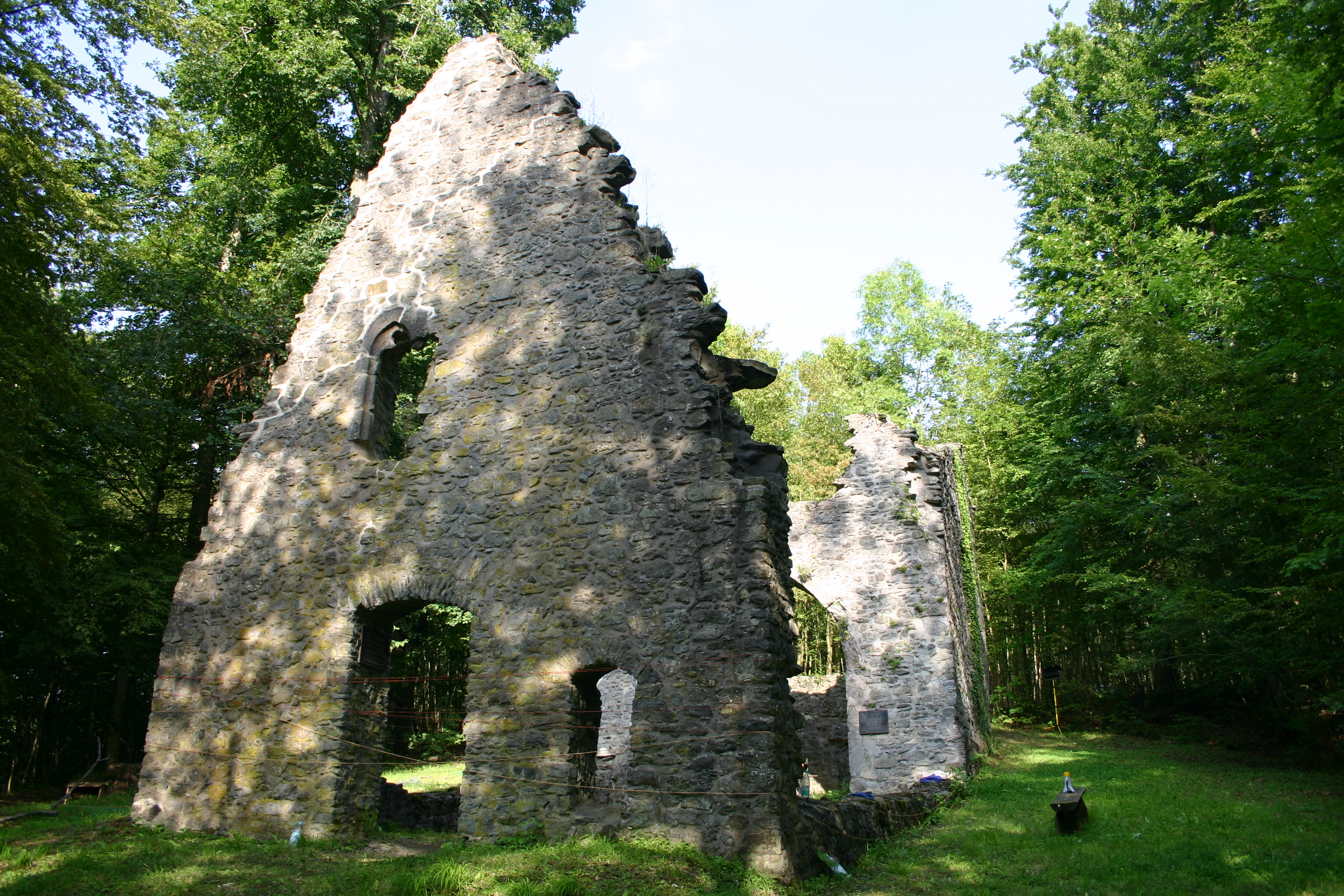
The ruined church "St. Valentin" of the deserted village Ruthardshausen, July 2007
