= My Opposition =

Diary by Friedrich Kellner, 1939–1945

My Opposition: The Diary of Friedrich Kellner - A German against the Third Reich
- 1st edition dust jacket
- Author: Friedrich Kellner
- Original title: "Vernebelt, verdunkelt sind alle Hirne" Tagebücher 1939-1945
- Translator: Robert Scott Kellner
- Cover artist: Rob Lock
- Language: English
- Subject: World War II, Nazi Germany
- Genre: Historical diary
- Publisher: Cambridge University Press, Cambridge, UK
- Publication date: 2011 German edition
- Publication place: United Kingdom
- English publication date: 2018
- Media type: print
- Pages: 520
- ISBN: 978-1-108-41829-4

My Opposition (German: Mein Widerstand) is a diary secretly written by the German social democrat Friedrich Kellner (1885–1970) during World War II to describe life under Nazi Germany and to expose the propaganda and the crimes of the Nazi dictatorship. Comprising ten notebooks, it is considered by leading historians as "an important piece of historical literature." The editors of the German magazine Der Spiegel called it "an image of Nazi Germany that has never existed before in such a vivid, concise and challenging form." Kellner began his 861-page diary on September 1, 1939, and wrote his last entry on May 17, 1945.

In 1968, Kellner gave the diary to his American grandson, Robert Scott Kellner, to translate into English and to bring it to the attention of the public. Kellner's diary is voluminous, and all the entries were handwritten in the Sütterlin script. The amount of material and possible transcription efforts dissuaded publishers from the project for many years, until in 2005 when former US president George H. W. Bush, who had been a combat pilot in World War II, arranged for the diary to be exhibited in his presidential library, which brought the diary to the public.

The diary has been on exhibit in museums in America and Germany. The first exhibit was at the George Bush Presidential Library in April and May 2005 to commemorate the 60th anniversary of Victory in Europe Day, which took place on May 8, 1945. The exhibit led to a collaboration between Robert Scott Kellner and the Holocaust Literature Research Unit at the University of Giessen in Germany to publish the diary in Germany. In 2011 the diary was published in its original language by Wallstein Verlag in Göttingen, Germany, under the title, Vernebelt, verdunkelt sind alle Hirne, Tagebücher 1939-1945. (Literal translation: Clouded, darkened are all of the minds, Diaries 1939-1945.) Translated abridgments followed in Russia and Poland. In 2018 Cambridge University Press published the English translation, My Opposition: The Diary of Friedrich Kellner -- A German against the Third Reich.

== Author ==
Friedrich Kellner was a justice inspector in the courthouse in Mainz from 1903 until the end of 1932. During the war years (1914–18), he served as an infantry sergeant in the German army. When the First World War ended and Germany became a republic, Kellner worked as a political activist for the Social Democratic Party of Germany. He openly campaigned against the Nazis until they came to power.

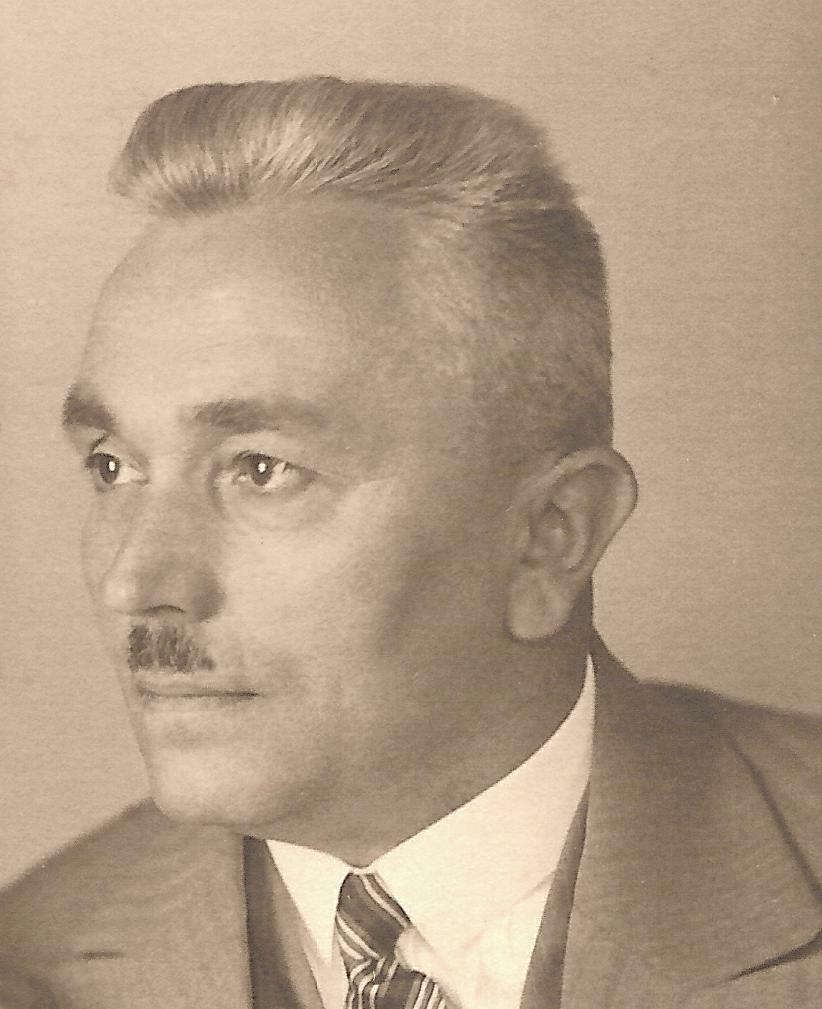
Friedrich Kellner 1934

Once in power, Adolf Hitler banned the Social Democratic Party and other political organizations. Concerned for his family's safety, Kellner moved to the town of Laubach in Hesse, where he found employment as administration manager of the courthouse. When Hitler ordered the invasion of Poland on September 1, 1939, Kellner began his diary, risking his life to record the crimes of the Third Reich. He fashioned a hiding place in the back of his dining room cabinet to secure his writings. Despite surveillance by the SS and interrogations, he kept to his self-appointed task throughout the war.

At war's end, Friedrich Kellner became deputy mayor of Laubach. After using his diary to help remove former Nazis from positions of power in the region, he returned the notebooks to their hiding place and worked to reestablish the Social Democratic Party. He was elected chairman of the Laubach branch and served Laubach for a number of years as first town councilman. He retired from politics in 1959, at the age of seventy-four. In 1968 he gave the diary to his American grandson.

== The diary ==
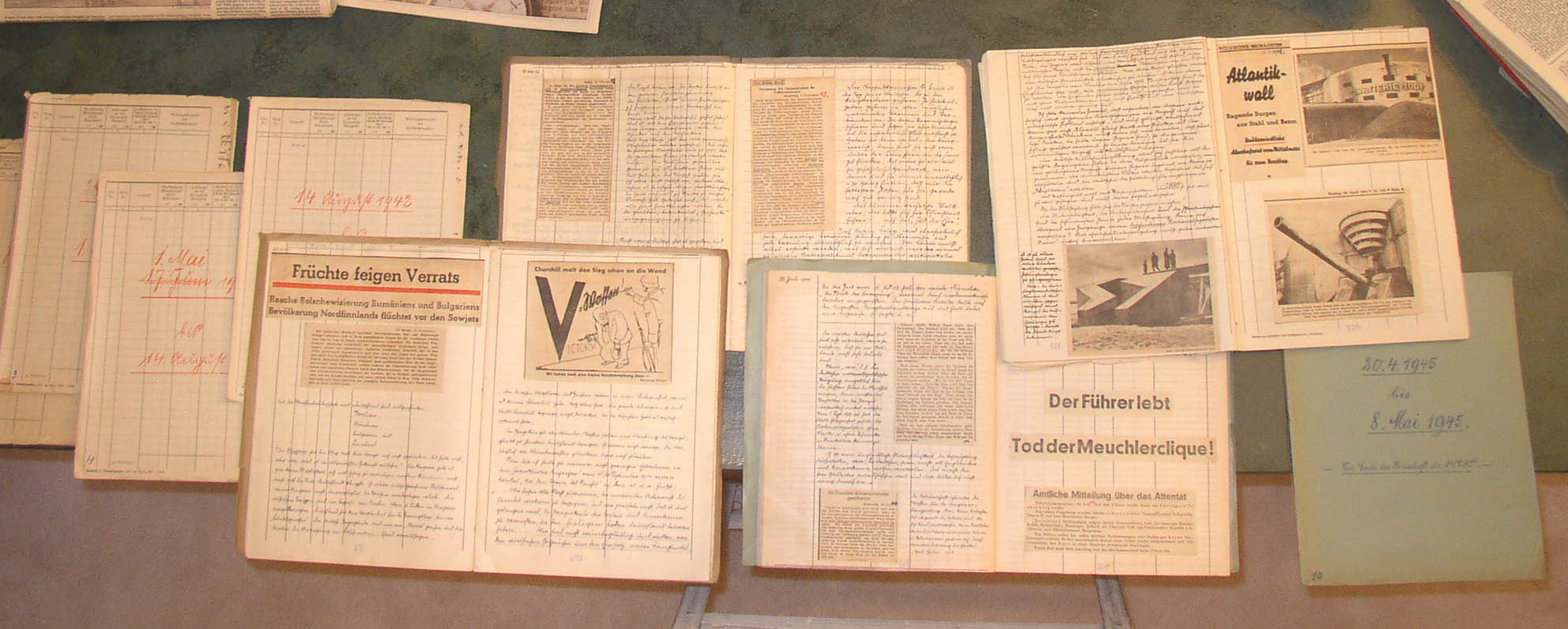
Friedrich Kellner Diary. Volumes of the diary.

Kellner considered his diary a response to Adolf Hitler's Mein Kampf, (My Struggle), so he named his diary Mein Widerstand, meaning My Opposition. It comprises ten notebooks totaling 861 pages. Because of the many notebooks, the diary is sometimes referred to in the plural, as "diaries", but it is a single work. Altogether there are 676 dated entries. The handwriting is in the Sütterlin script, a style of German lettering no longer in use. Included among the pages of the diary are more than 500 newspaper clippings of news articles, headlines, and Supreme Command army bulletins, which enhance the diary's historical significance.

Additional material relating to the diary notebooks are Kellner's supplemental essays, news articles from Nazi newspapers, local Nazi Party documents concerning the Gestapo's surveillance of Kellner, and genealogy papers and family histories. Most of the documents, including the diary, were handwritten in the Old German style Sütterlin script, so it was necessary to transcribe the documents into modern lettering. The large amount of material dissuaded publishers from the project. In 1982, Purdue University historian Gordon Mork, who sought to have the diary for Purdue library's special collections, noted, "Because of the length of the material, I doubt that a complete publication of the diaries will ever be practical." Opportunities for publication were enhanced when former president George H. W. Bush, who had been a combat pilot in World War II, arranged for the diary to be exhibited in his presidential library in 2005.

Unlike the typical diary, the main focus of My Opposition is not on the Kellners' personal lives, their daily tribulations or how they managed to survive during the war. Yet there are a number of entries to that effect, such as this one written on 13 May 1941:

We are experiencing an almost unbearable shortage in many of our daily necessities and already there is talk about coming reductions in meat and bread rations. The farmers, too, will have shortages. Oh, well, the more victories, the more sorrows. Everything would be much simpler with a little less lust for expansion and a little more love for peace. The joy of militarism is a fixed horse for the majority of my countrymen.

And this entry on 20 January 1943 about the courthouse constable, who had been assigned by the SS to keep his eye on Kellner's activities:

This Nazi terrorist has a towering rage against non-Party members who manage to achieve things for themselves. This imbecile has us especially close to his heart. He makes no secret of his hateful feelings. He does not greet my wife at all; he ignores me unless he has to come in contact with me on an official basis.

=== Call to arms ===
On 17 September 1939 Kellner reflected on the foolish choices the Germans had made following World War I, electing Adolf Hitler and the National Socialists to power, and allowing Germany to become a totalitarian state:

We now have gone through the beginnings of two wars. Who dares to forecast the end of this one? Because of our experience with the war of 1914-18, Pauline and I are extremely skeptical. A burnt child fears the fire. What all can yet occur? The undreamed of, the unexpected. The land maps have been thrown out of joint. Has nothing even once been said of [Oswald Spengler's] The Decline of the West? Who carries the blame? The people without a brain! To trample democracy with one’s feet and give power to a single man over almost eighty million people is so terrible one can really tremble over the things that will come. A people allow an idea to be poured and hammered into them, narrow-mindedly follow every suggestion, let themselves be stepped on, tormented, conned, exhausted--and must, in addition, under national control, call out "Heil Hitler." One can feel only deep mourning in his heart over such a dreadful age and over the sheep-like patience of an entire population.

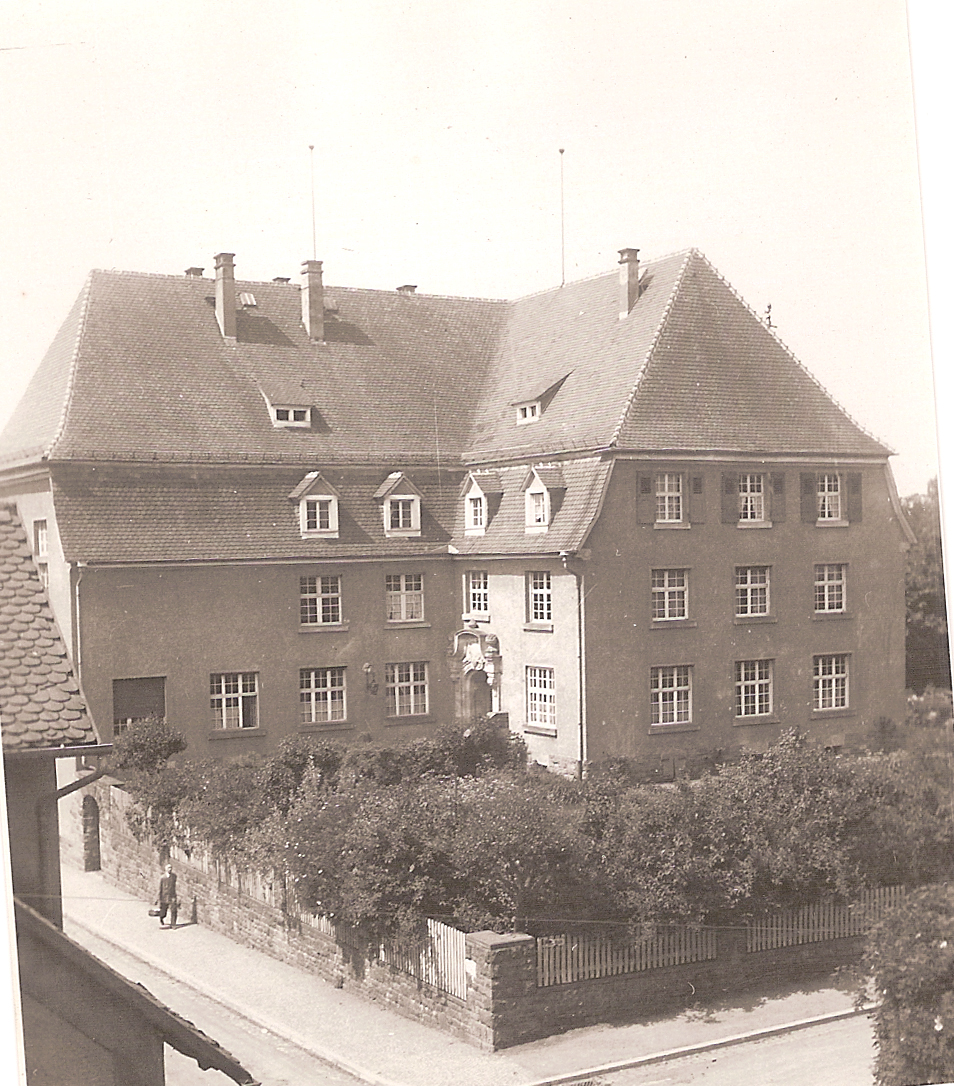
Laubach Courthouse in 1938, where the diary was written

Kellner's diary takes to task not only the German people who elected Hitler, but the citizens and leaders of other nations who remained indifferent to evidence that dictators in Germany, Italy and Japan were plotting to take possession of the entire world. In a number of entries, Kellner accused politicians in the democracies of failing to stand up against the dictators. He pointed out that the world's intelligentsia, university professors and professionals in medicine and law, were willing to accept the National Socialist propaganda. "Hitler duped the entire world. He had the great unbelievable luck to meet with weak and vacillating opponents, cowardly people who knew nothing of idealism or had a feeling for solidarity, who did not possess honor and love for freedom," he wrote on May 3, 1942.

He especially could not understand how those who had defeated Germany in the First World War watched without protest as Germany rearmed itself. In an entry dated 12 November 1940, he wrote:

Chamberlain and the entire subsequent government carry the blame for not having taken equivalent steps when they discovered Germany's preparations for war. A world power must always be prepared to successfully and energetically repulse any attack.

Also troubling to Kellner, aside from the Allies' failure to prepare for the war, was their hesitation to enter the war with their full forces once it had begun. When Poland was attacked in 1939, followed by attacks on Denmark, Norway, The Netherlands, Belgium and France, Kellner looked to the United States to come to Europe's aid. He could not understand why the United States acted so late to enter the war. On 25 June 1941, a few days after Operation Barbarossa and six months before Japan's surprise attack on Pearl Harbor, he wrote:

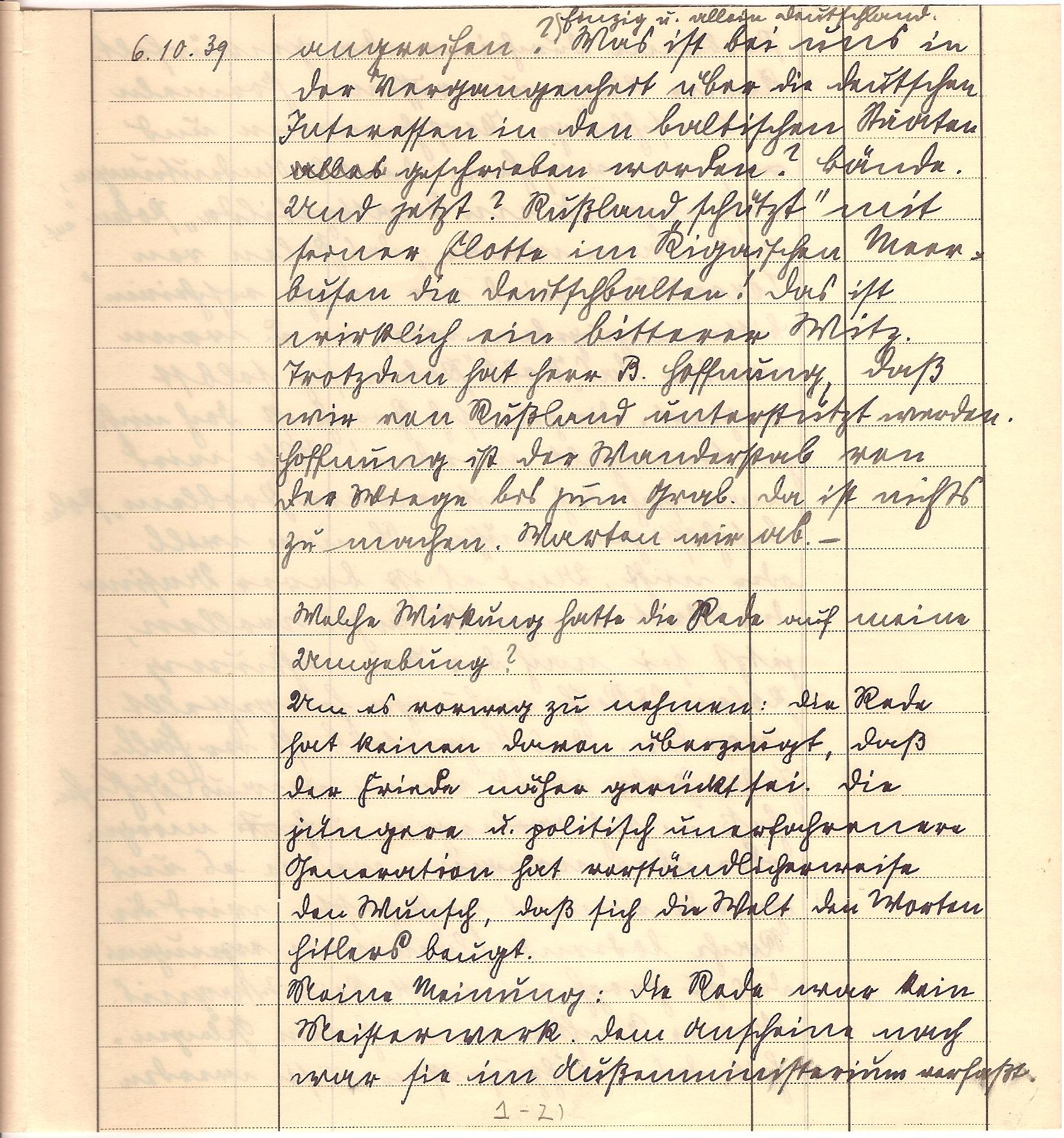
A page from the diary

When will this insanity be brought to an end? When will the intoxication of victory turn into a terrible hangover? Now is a unique chance for England and America to take the initiative, but not only with empty promises and insufficient measures. America will not be able to bring about a utopia here, but if it sincerely has the will to throw its entire might into the fray, America could tip the balance and bring back peace. At the height of their insane power, the German people cannot be brought to reason with words. Only a tremendous force and the commitment of all war material can bring the wild steer to its senses. I would like to assume that at least some men in the world are energetically working to do for humanity what all the other statesmen--through unbelievable short-sightedness--neglected or failed to do. Mankind, awake! Concentrate all your might against the destroyers of peace! . . . No deliberations, no resolutions, no rhetoric, no "neutrality." Advance against the enemy of mankind!

In the same entry he angrily wrote:

Even today there are idiots in America who talk nonsense about some compromise with Germany under Adolf Hitler. They are the most atrocious dummies.

=== Record of atrocities ===
In a number of entries, Kellner records atrocities being committed by the German soldiers. On 29 July 1941 he recorded what he learned of the deliberate execution of captured Russian soldiers in the prisoner-of-war camps:

Wounded soldiers in the field hospital in Giessen are saying Russian prisoners-of-war are to be killed. Barbarous gangsters! Are the German people a people of culture? No! A cultured people must be able to think as individuals and behave properly, but our people have repeatedly allowed themselves to be controlled and guided by their "infallible" Führer without participating in the slightest degree in their own fate. "The Führer is always right, the Führer never errs."

And he denounced the German military for their policies against the resistance forces in the occupied lands. On 26 October 1941 he wrote:

In Nantes and Bordeaux in France, two German officers were shot by unknown culprits. Fifty citizens in each of these towns were apprehended and executed in retribution. To let people who are completely innocent suffer for the deed of another is reminiscent of the horrific deeds of wild beasts in times long gone. It remained to General von Stülpnagel to revive one of the most gruesome deeds. The world will rightfully be outraged over so much inhumanity, and it will ignite a hatred that can never be extinguished. . . . How long will this reign of terror continue?

Perhaps the single most important entry in the diary is dated October 28, 1941. After the war many Germans would insist they knew nothing at all about the Holocaust. More recently, Holocaust deniers have questioned the extent, and even the existence of the Holocaust. Friedrich Kellner's diary counters such suggestions:

A soldier on leave here said he personally witnessed a terrible atrocity in the occupied part of Poland. He watched as naked Jewish men and women were placed in front of a long deep ditch and, upon the order of the SS, were shot by Ukrainians in the back of their heads, and they fell into the ditch. Then the ditch was filled in as screams kept coming from it!! These inhuman atrocities are so terrible that even the Ukrainians who were used for the manual labor suffered nervous breakdowns. All soldiers who had knowledge of these bestial actions of those Nazi sub-human beings were of the same opinion that the German people should already be trembling in their shoes because of the coming retribution. There is no punishment that would be hard enough to be applied to these Nazi beasts. Of course, in the case of retribution the innocent will have to suffer along with them. Ninety-nine percent of the German people, directly or indirectly, carry the guilt for the present situation. Therefore we can only say this: Those who travel together, hang together.

Kellner also recorded the miscarriages of justice within Germany itself, where the Nazis' disregard for laws and human life took its toll upon the citizenry. On 5 July 1941 he wrote this:

In Giessen, Forester [Rudolf] Ritter should have been arrested because he said the war would last another three years. Two years ago R. was executed because he maintained that the war would last two years. The truth may not be said.

=== Results of totalitarianism ===
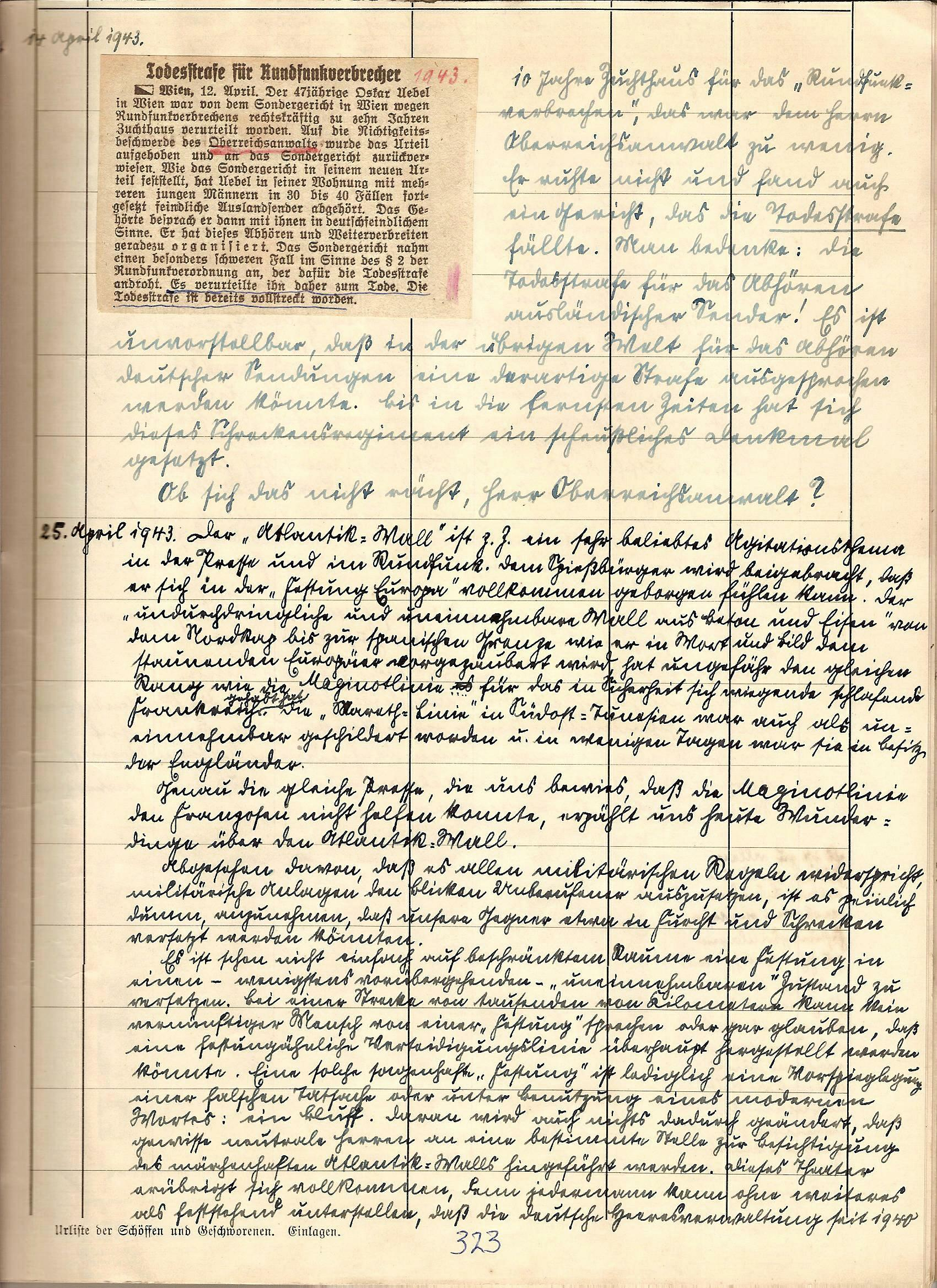
Entry of April 14, 1943, about death sentence for listening to an overseas radio broadcast.

Kellner was particularly incensed by the internal censorship laws. Censorship in Nazi Germany was implemented by the Minister of Propaganda, Joseph Goebbels. All media—literature, music, newspapers, and radio broadcasts—were censored, in an effort to reinforce Nazi power and to suppress opposing viewpoints and information. On 14 April 1943, upon reading that the People's Court of Justice in Vienna had imposed the death sentence on a man accused of listening to a non-censored overseas radio broadcast, Kellner cut the article from the newspaper and wrote next to it:

Ten years in prison for a "radio crime"! But that was not punishment enough for the senior Reich prosecutor, who did not rest until he found a court that would give the death sentence. Just think: the death penalty for listening to a foreign broadcast! It is inconceivable any other country in the world would give out such a punishment for listening to a German broadcast. This terror regime has given itself a gruesome monument into the distant future. Will there not be retribution, Herr Reich Prosecutor?

Two months before the war's end, on 7 March 1945, when the Allied armies crossed the Rhine and entered German territory, Friedrich Kellner tried to explain why the German people themselves had not rebelled against Nazi rule, and why it was necessary for outside forces to rid the Germans of the tyrannical government they themselves had voted into power.

The way that leads to the abyss for the German people has come even though the Party patriots continue ever to believe and hope. There are still those who do not want to see, who will hope right up to their funeral for a miracle from the Führer. In all other respects the number of peace lovers grows from hour to hour.

The coming generations and the foreign countries will never understand why the German people did not stop the Party leaders by force and turn against the Party tyranny so this horrible war could be terminated. To clarify that, I would remind them the number of Party members is extremely large, particularly the Party functionaries with power. Plus millions of people fully believed in the National Socialist philosophy and were influenced by the Führer's radio broadcasts and the detailed manipulations of Party propaganda.

There is no important place in the state or in the private sector that has not been occupied by proven Party members . . . so wherever there might be a reaction, a Hitler guard stands. And those who are in these positions, who earn their living under Hitler, are certainly not opponents of the Hitler system. They want victory and not the defeat of Hitler because they will lose everything in a defeat, even though some of them, to disguise their black souls, have treated people somewhat more leniently.

Today our opponents are at the Rhine in the West, and at the Oder in the East, and still I do not believe a collapse can be brought about by a popular uprising. Without assistance from outside it is not to be considered. Only the armed forces would be able to make a conclusive end. There, however, a united will is missing. The prominent officers know just as well as the Party officials they are going to be swept away when the war is lost. National Socialism and German militarism will cease to exist. Therefore the war continues until it is impossible for any further war actions. The war will end when the German troops finally run out of ammunition to fire at the advancing enemy.

That is how I imagine the war will end. The opponents must continue to use their might in order to terminate the war.

== Reception of the diary ==
Museum exhibits

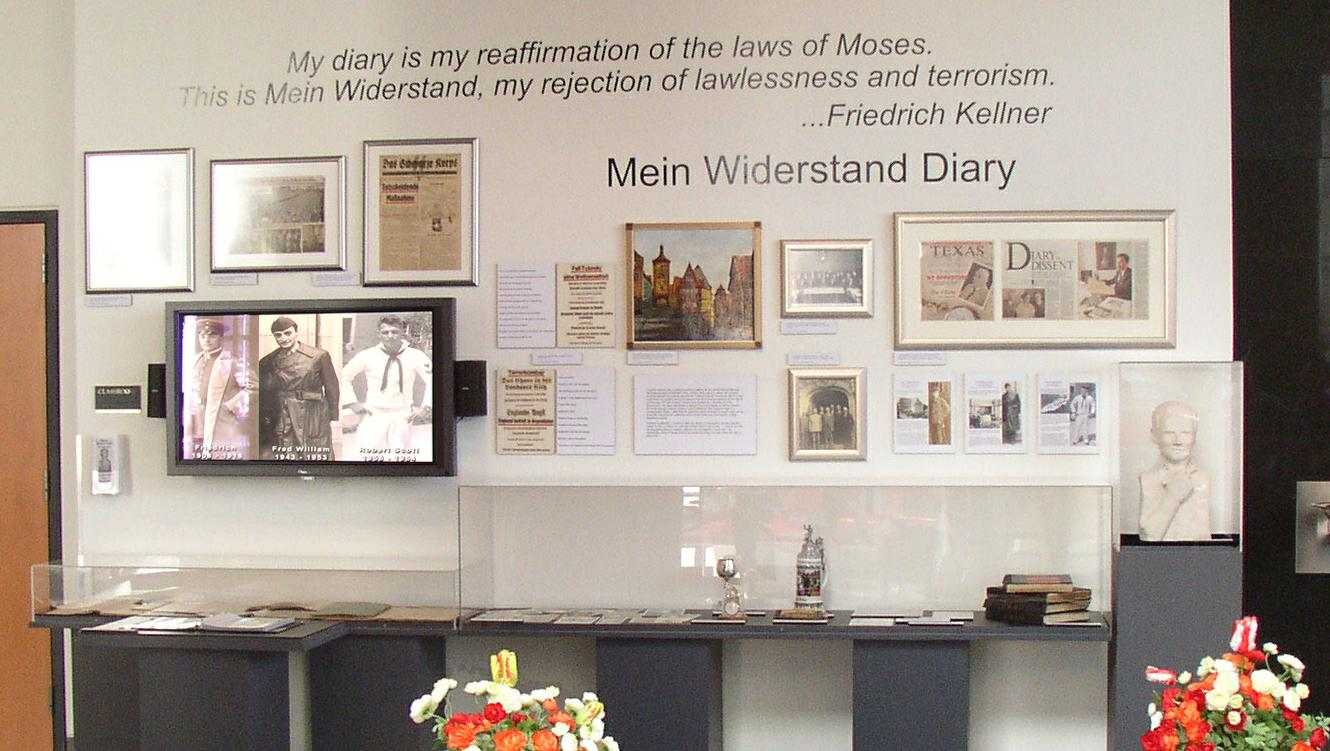
The first public exhibit of the Friedrich Kellner diary, George Bush Presidential Library and Museum in College Station, Texas, April - May 2005

- April - May 2005: George Bush Presidential Library and Museum in College Station, Texas to commemorate the 60th anniversary of Victory in Europe Day.
- September 2005: Laubach Heimat Museum, Laubach, Germany. In 2007 this was made a permanent exhibit of diary facsimiles and historical photographs.
- May - August 2006: Holocaust Museum Houston in Texas.
- October 2007: The Great Synagogue of Stockholm, in Stockholm, Sweden.
- November 10, 2008: Dag Hammarskjöld Library, United Nations Headquarters in New York City
- December 2009 - January 2010: Friedrich Ebert Foundation in Berlin, Germany
- January 15 - February 23, 2010 Friedrich Ebert Foundation's Social Democracy Archives (on German Wikipedia) in Bonn, Germany.
- May - December 2010: Dwight Eisenhower Presidential Library and Museum in Abilene, Kansas, as part of the exhibit "Eisenhower and the Righteous Cause: The Liberation of Europe."
- June 25–28, 2018: Yad Vashem, Jerusalem, Israel, in the International School for Holocaust Studies during the 10th International Conference on Holocaust Education.

Museum and library offers to house the diary

- Yad Vashem Holocaust Remembrance Center in Jerusalem
- The United States Holocaust Memorial Museum in Washington, D.C.
- The Canadian Museum for Human Rights, Winnipeg, Manitoba
- Purdue University
- Columbia University
- Stanford University, Hoover Institute
- University of Texas at Austin

== Publishing the diary ==
- 2011 the complete and definitive edition of the diary was published by Wallstein Verlag in Göttingen, Germany, under the title Vernebelt, verdunkelt sind alle Hirne, Tagebücher 1939-1945. It is in two hardcover volumes, 1134 pages, 104 illustrations and photographs.
- 2014 the Russian monthly magazine Inostrannaya Literatura published excerpts from the diary, a total of 40,000 words, in a lengthy article titled Odurachen v tret'yem reykhe (in English: Fooled in the Third Reich).
- 2015 a Polish abridgment consisting of the first three notebooks of the diary was published by the KARTA Center under the title Dziennik Sprzeciwu: Tajne Zapiski Obywatela III Rzeszy (in English: Diary of Opposition: Secret Notes by a Citizen of the Third Reich).
- 2018 the English translation of the diary was published by Cambridge University Press under the title My Opposition: The Diary of Friedrich Kellner -- A German against the Third Reich. Translated and edited by Robert Scott Kellner, it is a single hardcover volume of 520 pages with 53 illustrations and photographs.

== Documentary film ==
CCI Entertainment, a Canadian film company, produced a documentary film entitled, My Opposition: The Diaries of Friedrich Kellner, which interweaves the stories of Kellner and his American grandson, using reenactments, photographs, and archival footage. During parts of the documentary, an actor reads diary entries that relate to the historic narrative of the film, and the camera scans pages of the diary. The film was broadcast on prime-time television in Canada in 2007. It was shown in a number of film festivals in the United States, Canada, and Israel. It was screened in November 2008 at the Dag Hammarskjold Auditorium at United Nations Headquarters in New York in commemoration of the 70th anniversary of Kristallnacht.
