= My Opposition: The Diaries of Friedrich Kellner =

- DVD cover
- Directed by: Fern Levitt
- Starring: Robert Scott Kellner; Max Eisen; Doloris Funt; Jesse Dubinsky
- Narrated by: Nicky Guadagni
- Theme music composer: Alex Khaskin
- Country of origin: Canada
- Original languages: English; German

Production
- Producer: Arnie Zipursky
- Cinematography: Bill Metcalfe
- Editor: Nick Hector
- Running time: 65 minutes
- Production company: Abella Entertainment

Original release
- Release: June 16, 2007

My Opposition: The Diaries of Friedrich Kellner is a 2007 documentary television film about an orphaned American who went in search of his German grandfather and discovered a secret diary written during the time of the Third Reich. The film is a production of Abella Entertainment Ltd. of Toronto, Canada, co-produced and co-directed by Arnie Zipursky and Fern Levitt, with executive co-producer Leonard Asper of CanWest Global. The film is distributed by CCI Releasing.

The documentary was based on news stories in Germany and America about the Friedrich Kellner diary. Because the diary consists of ten notebooks written over a period of six years, it sometimes is referred to in the plural as "diaries." The documentary was produced for Canadian television and shown in prime time on Global Television Network. The film received a 2007 Creative Excellence Award from the U.S. International Film and Video Festival in Los Angeles.

A version of the documentary for libraries and schools has been produced by Chip Taylor Communications. This version has been renamed Anti-Nazi: My Opposition - The Diaries of Friedrich Kellner.

== Plot ==
The documentary tells the story of Chief Justice Inspector Friedrich Kellner and the ten-volume secret diary he wrote during World War II in Laubach, Germany, to record the misdeeds of the Nazis. The movie uses reenactments and archival footage and interviews to recount the lives of Friedrich Kellner, who risked his life to write the diary, and of his orphaned American grandson, Robert Scott Kellner, who located his grandparents in Germany, and then spent much of his life bringing the Kellner diary to the public.

The combined stories in the documentary are told by three narrators: Robert Scott Kellner tells the story of his grandparents and relates his own history; Friedrich Kellner speaks aloud (through the voice of Tony Daniels) as he writes entries into his diary; and the voice of Nicky Guadagni provides historical background and additional biographical information.

The documentary begins in 2005 with Robert Scott Kellner in Germany relating the story of his 1960 search for his grandparents, Justice Inspector Friedrich Kellner and his wife, Pauline. Photographs show Friedrich as a soldier in World War I, and as a political activist after the war for the Social Democratic Party of Germany (SPD). Dramatic reenactments depict Kellner as he campaigns against Adolf Hitler and the Nazi Party. At his rallies, he holds a copy of Hitler’s book, Mein Kampf, above his head and cries out: "Gutenberg, your printing press has been violated by this evil book." Later, Kellner struggles to stop the mindless rampages of Kristallnacht, and as a consequence he is brought before a tribunal and threatened with imprisonment in a concentration camp. The film explores both his active and passive resistance during the Third Reich as he distributes Allied leaflets and risks his life to write the diary. When World War II comes to an end, Kellner helps to restore the Social Democratic Party and becomes the chairman of the party in his region.

Interwoven with Friedrich Kellner's story are two others: that of his errant son, Fred, who becomes caught up in Nazi ideology and ultimately commits suicide; and the dramatic story of Fred’s son, Friedrich’s grandson, Robert Scott Kellner. The grandson, abandoned as a child, joins the U.S. Navy at the age of seventeen and goes to Germany in search of his family. When he finds his grandparents and learns about the secret diary, he devotes himself to bringing the diary to the attention of the public and to using its message to counter neo-Nazism and anti-Semitism. In a fashion similar to when his grandfather used Mein Kampf to bring attention to Hitler’s evil purpose, Robert Scott Kellner uses his grandfather’s diary to warn against extremists in the Islamic world and their modern version of totalitarianism.

== Cast ==
The actor portraying the younger Friedrich Kellner as a political activist is Mark Goldstein; the 70-year-old Friedrich is played by Max Eisen, Holocaust survivor and noted Canadian speaker. Friedrich’s wife, Pauline, is played by Roseanne Mason for the early years; Doloris Funt is the older Pauline. The three actors portraying Robert Scott Kellner as a child, youth, and sailor are Andrew Elder, Hugh Fisher, and Jesse Dubinsky. The voice of Friedrich Kellner is the noted narrator, Tony Daniels, and the historical narrator is the actress Nicky Guadagni.

== Background and production ==
Prior to the production of the documentary, the original volumes of the Friedrich Kellner diary were on exhibit at the George Bush Presidential Library to commemorate the 60th anniversary of VE Day, Victory in Europe Day.

The filming of the documentary coincided with an exhibit of the diary at the Heimat Museum in Germany. This exhibit is included in the final cut of the film.

The documentary was filmed primarily in three locations in Germany: Mainz, where Friedrich Kellner campaigned against the Nazi Party prior to Hitler's taking power; Laubach, where Kellner lived during the war and wrote his secret diary; Hungen, where in 1960 Kellner's grandson found unexpected help in locating his grandparents. The interviews with Robert Scott Kellner, story consultant and principal narrator, were filmed in Mainz, Laubach, and College Station, Texas. The re-enactment scenes were staged and filmed in Toronto, Canada.

== Distribution ==
On June 16, 2007, the film had its Canadian premiere in prime time on Global Television Network.
On September 26, 2007, the film had its American premiere in the theater of the George Bush Presidential Library.
In November 2008, the film was screened at the United Nations as part of the U.N.’s outreach program, The Holocaust and the United Nations, to commemorate the 70th anniversary of Kristallnacht.

== Reception ==
The documentary was chosen as the Tikkun Olam screening for the Calgary Jewish Film Festival in 2007, and it was also screened at the Toronto Jewish Film Festival in 2008.

As a result of the relevance of the story line, which depicts the historical diary as a weapon against intolerance, the documentary was chosen to commemorate the 70th anniversary of Kristallnacht in a screening at the Dag Hammarskjöld Library at the United Nations Headquarters in New York City.
