= Friedrich Kellner =

German Justice inspector (1885–1970)

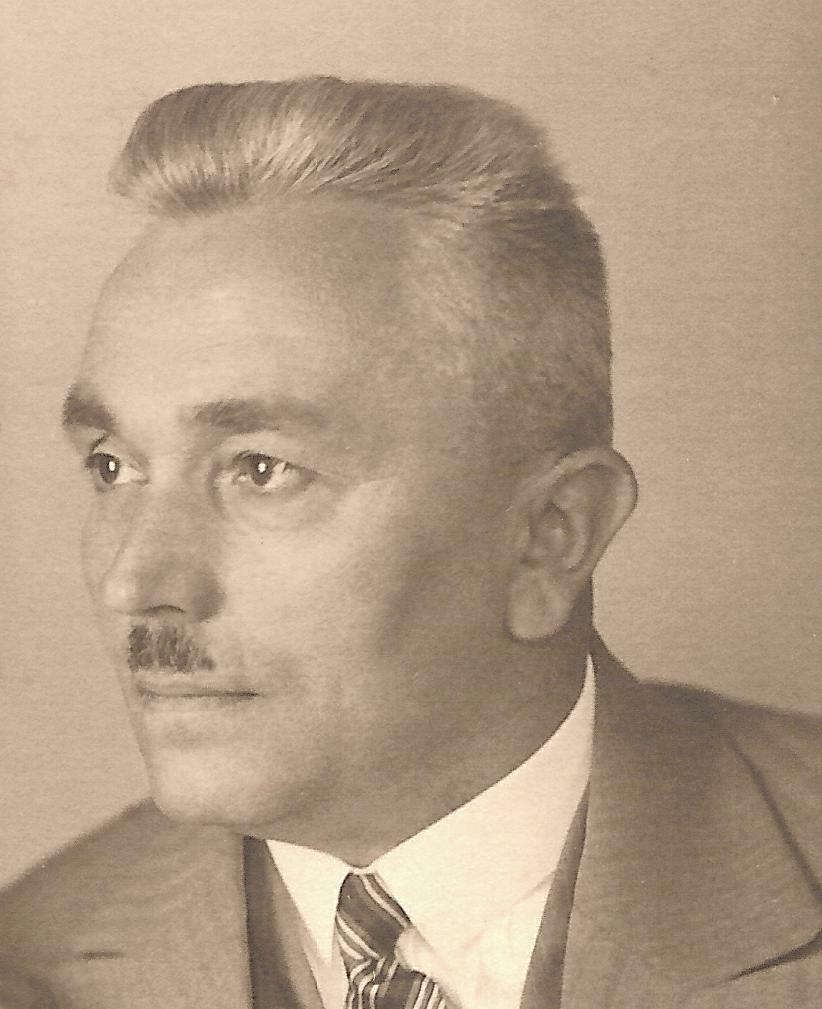
- Friedrich Kellner in 1934
- Born: 1 February 1885; Vaihingen an der Enz, German Empire
- Died: 4 November 1970 (aged 85); Lich, West Germany
- Education: Oberrealschule (High School)
- Occupation: Justice Inspector
- Spouse: Pauline Preuss
- Children: 1

August Friedrich Kellner (1 February 1885 – 4 November 1970) was a German mid-level official and diarist who worked as a justice inspector in Laubach from 1933 to 1945.

Kellner was an infantryman in a Hessian regiment during the First World War. After the war, he became a political organizer for the Social Democratic Party of Germany, one of the leading political parties during the time of the turbulent and short-lived Weimar Republic, Germany's first period of democracy. Kellner and his wife, Pauline, campaigned together as Social Democrats against Adolf Hitler and the Nazis.

During World War II, working as a civil servant at a small court house, Kellner wrote a diary to record his observations of the Nazi regime. Based on conversations and attentive reading of newspapers, he described the various crimes of that regime. He titled his work Mein Widerstand, meaning "My Opposition". After the war Kellner served on denazification boards, and he also helped to reestablish the Social Democratic Party. In 1968, he gave his diary to his American grandson, Robert Scott Kellner, to translate into English and to bring it to the attention of the public.

Kellner's diary is voluminous – consisting of 10 notebooks – and all the entries were handwritten in the Old German style Sütterlin script. As a result, the amount of material and possible transcription efforts dissuaded publishers from the project for many years. German and English publishers were not interested in publishing the diary initially, until in 2005, when former US president George H. W. Bush, who had been a combat pilot in World War II, arranged for the diary to be exhibited in his presidential library, which brought the diary to the public. A Canadian film company produced a documentary about Kellner and his diary in 2007; Robert Scott Kellner edited and translated the diary, and it was eventually published in German in 2011 and in English in 2018.

Kellner explained his purpose for writing the diary:

"I could not fight the Nazis in the present, as they had the power to still my voice, so I decided to fight them in the future. I would give the coming generations a weapon against any resurgence of such evil. My eyewitness account would record the barbarous acts, and also show the way to stop them."

== Biography ==
=== Family and education ===
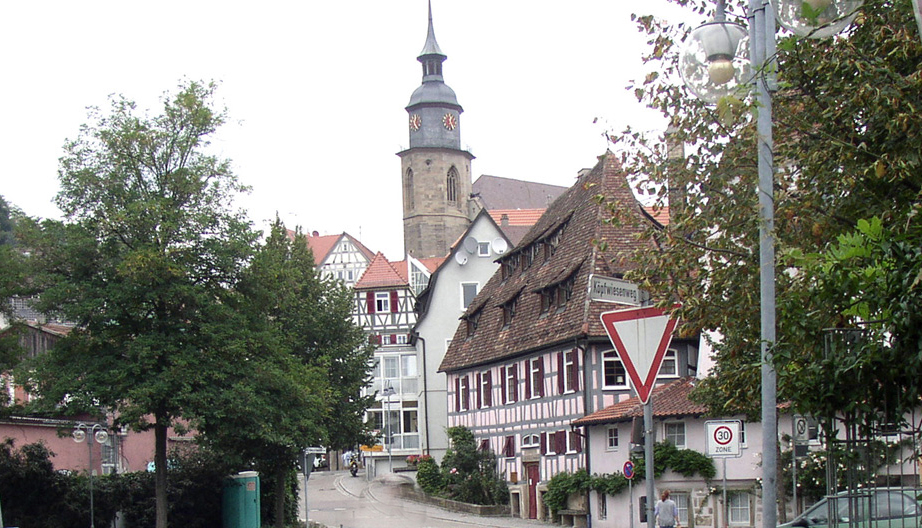
Vaihingen an der Enz, Kellner birthplace

Kellner was born in Vaihingen an der Enz, a town on the Enz River in southern Germany. At the time of his birth, Vaihingen was part of the Kingdom of Württemberg in the German Empire. Kellner was the only child of Georg Friedrich Kellner, a baker and confectioner from the town of Arnstadt in Thuringia, and Barbara Wilhelmine Vaigle from Bietigheim-Bissingen near Ludwigsburg. The Kellner family could trace its beginnings to when the Protestant reformer Martin Luther lived and preached not far from Arnstadt. The Kellners were Evangelical Lutherans.

When Friedrich Kellner was four years old, his family moved to Mainz where his father became the master baker at Goebel's Confectionery (Goebels Zuckerwerk).

After completing Volksschule, primary school, Kellner had a nine-year course of non-classical study in the Oberrealschule in Mainz. In 1902 he completed his final exams at Goetheschule, which qualified him for an apprenticeship in courthouse administration.

In 1903 he started work as a junior clerk in the Mainz courthouse, remaining there until 1933. He advanced in the administrative ranks to justice secretary, then to court accountant, and in April 1920 to justice inspector.

=== Military service and marriage ===
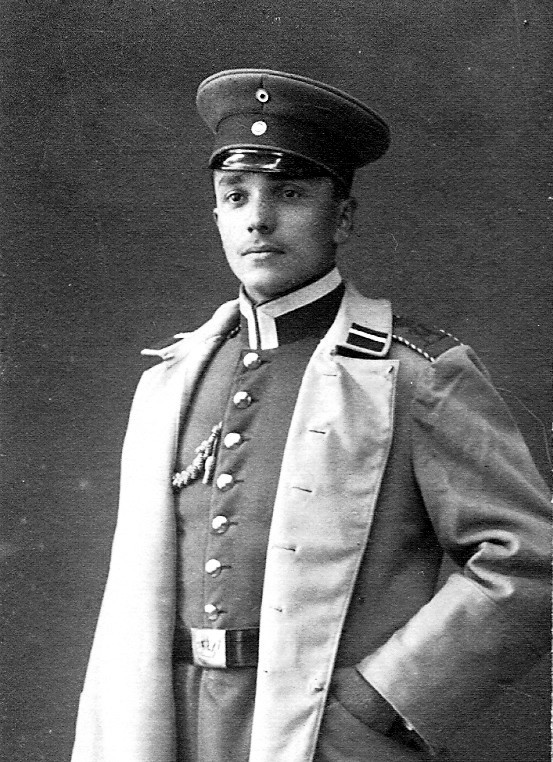
Friedrich Kellner, 1914

From September 1907 to October 1908, Kellner fulfilled his initial military reserve duty in the 6th Infantry Company of the Leibregiments Großherzogin (3. Großherzoglich Hessisches) Nr. 117 in Mainz. In 1911, he completed an additional two months reserve training.

When the First World War began in 1914, Kellner was called up for active duty as a sergeant and deputy-officer in the Prinz Carl Infantry Regiment (4. Großherzoglich Hessisches Regiment) Nr. 118, in Worms. Within the first month of his return to army service, Kellner was in eight engagements in Belgium and France, including fights at Neufchâteau, Revigny-Laimont, and Rinarville, associated with what has become known as the Battle of the Frontiers. His regiment also fought at the First Battle of the Marne from 5 to 12 September. Under a prolonged bombardment in the trenches near Reims, he was wounded and was sent to St. Rochus Hospital in Mainz to recover. He spent the remainder of the war as a quartermaster secretary for the 13th Army Corps in Frankfurt am Main.

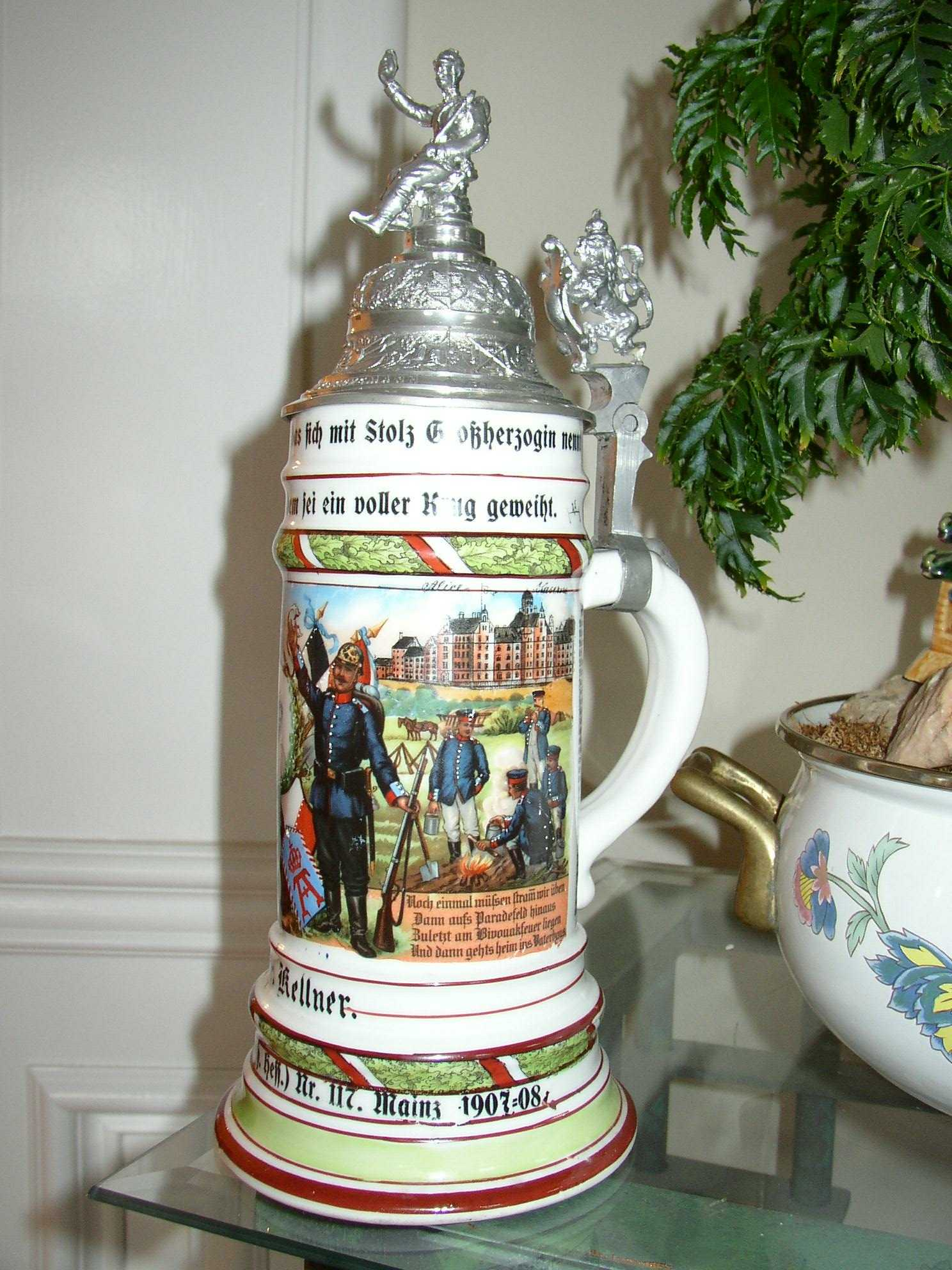
1908 reservistenkrug

In 1913, a few months prior to being called up for service in the war, Kellner married Pauline Preuss (1888–1970), who was from Mainz. Their son, Karl Friedrich Wilhelm (a.k.a. Fred William), their only child, was born in Mainz on 29 February 1916.

=== Political activism ===
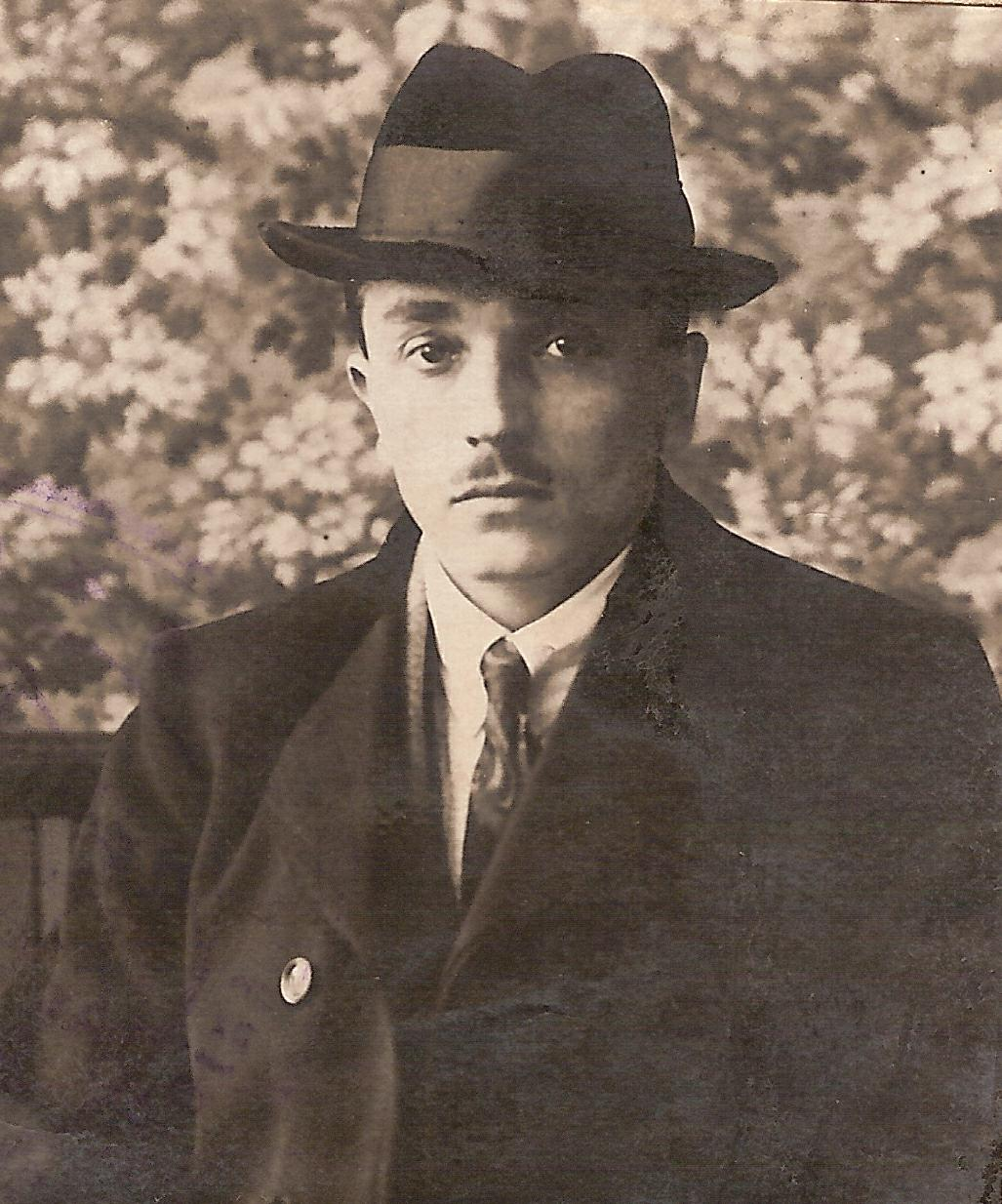
Inspector Kellner, 1923.

Kellner welcomed the birth of German democracy after the war. In 1919 he became a political organizer for the Mainz branch of the Social Democratic Party of Germany, the (SPD). Throughout the 1920s and into the 1930s, he spoke out against the danger posed to the fragile democracy by the extremists in the Communist Party and the Nazi Party. At rallies near the Gutenberg Museum, which honored Johannes Gutenberg, the founder of the printing press, Kellner would hold above his head Adolf Hitler's book, Mein Kampf, and yell out to the crowd: "Gutenberg, your printing press has been violated by this evil book." He would often be accosted by brown-shirted thugs from the Nazi Party, known as Storm Troopers.

Two weeks before Adolf Hitler was sworn in as Chancellor in January 1933, and before the beginning of Hitler's murderous purge of his political opponents, Kellner and his family moved to the village of Laubach in Hesse, where he worked as the chief justice inspector in the district court. In 1935 his son emigrated to the United States in order to avoid service in the Wehrmacht, Hitler's armed forces.

During the November pogrom of 1938, known as Kristallnacht ("Night of the Broken Glass"), Friedrich and Pauline Kellner tried to stop the rioting. When Kellner approached the presiding judge to bring charges against the leaders of the riot, Judge Schmitt instead opened an investigation into the Kellners' religious heritage. The Kellner family documents, which included baptismal records dating back three hundred years, proved Kellner and his wife were Christians. On 18 November 1938 the district judge in Darmstadt closed the case in Kellner's favor: "Doubts about the Kellner bloodlines cannot be validated." A finding to the contrary could have meant imprisonment and death.

=== The war years ===
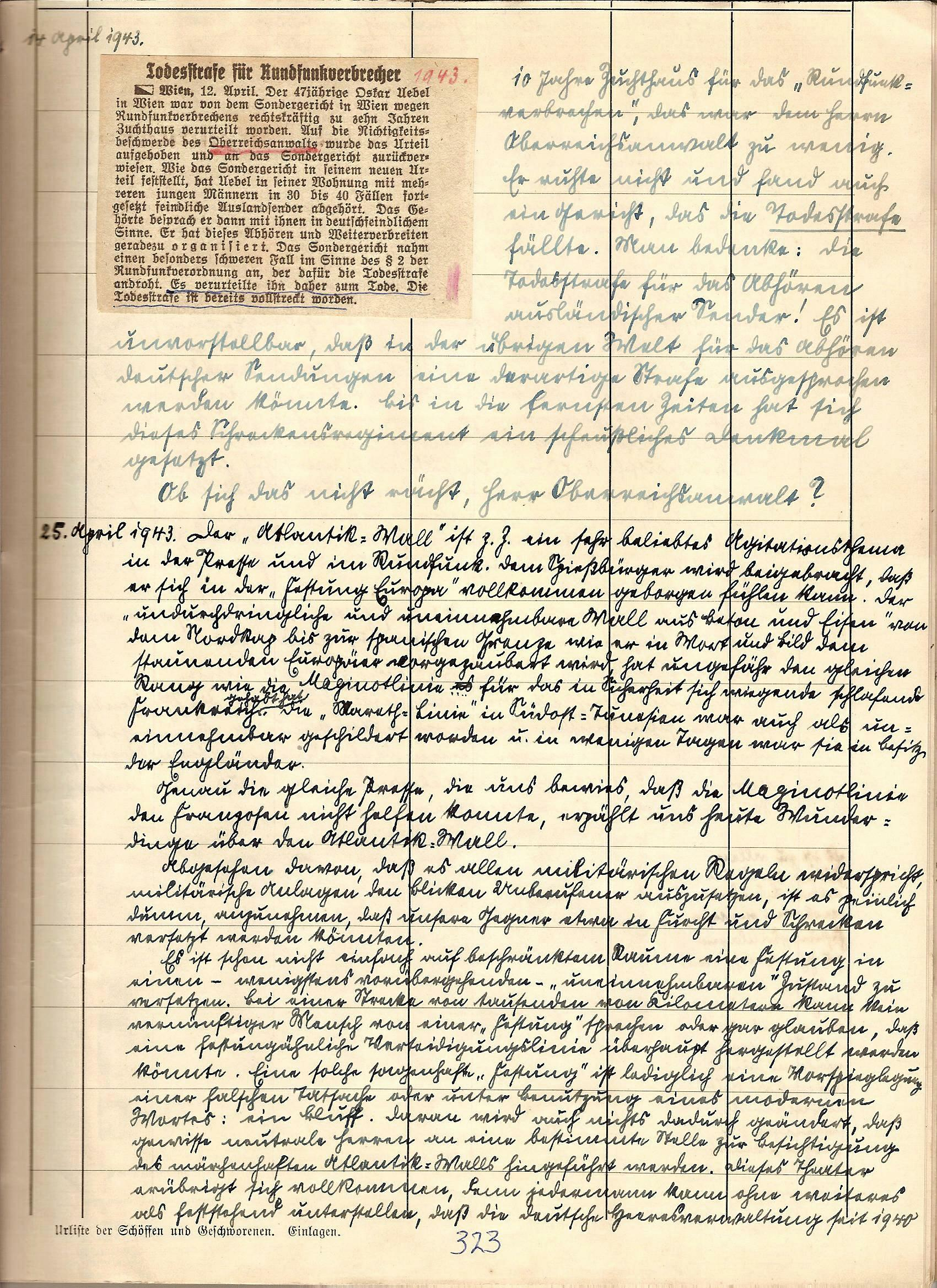
A page from the diary

From his reading of Mein Kampf, Kellner believed the election of Adolf Hitler would mean another war in Europe, and events soon were to support his view. Within a few years after coming to power, Hitler abrogated the Treaty of Versailles, re-militarized the Rhineland, expanded the German military forces, and spent great sums to outfit those forces with modern weaponry. Although the leaders in the democracies were concerned about such rearmament, they failed to take action to stop it. On 1 September 1939, in coordination with the Soviet Union, Hitler ordered the German armed forces to invade Poland.

It was on this day that Friedrich Kellner began to record his observations in a secret diary that he entitled Mein Widerstand, "My Opposition". He wanted the coming generations to know how easily young democracies could turn into dictatorships, and how people were too willing to believe propaganda rather than resist tyranny and terrorism.

Kellner did not confine himself to the diary. He continued to express his views, and in February 1940 he was summoned to the district court in Giessen where he was warned by the president of the court, Hermann Colnot, to moderate his views. A few months later he was summoned to the mayor's office in Laubach where he was warned by the mayor and the local Nazi Party leader that he and his wife would be sent to a concentration camp if he continued to be a "bad influence" on the population of Laubach. A report written by the district Nazi leader, Hermann Engst, shows that authorities were planning to punish Kellner at the conclusion of the war.

Throughout the first two years of the war, Kellner looked to America to provide support for the United Kingdom and France. Numerous entries in the diary reveal Kellner's belief that Germany had no chance to win if America would put aside its neutrality and do more than just send supplies to the United Kingdom. When Germany declared war on America in 1941, the diary entries show Kellner's impatience for the Allies to mount an effective invasion of the continent, and to bring the fight to the Germans on their own territory. When the invasion of Normandy took place on 6 June 1944, Kellner inscribed in large letters in the entry of that date: "Endlich!," meaning "Finally!"

Kellner rarely wrote about his personal situation. He wrote primarily about Nazi policies and propaganda, and about the war. He noted the injustices in the court system, and recorded the inhumane deeds and genocidal intentions of the Nazis. In all of this he considered the German people as accomplices before and after the fact: first voting Hitler into power, and then acquiescing in his abuse of that power.

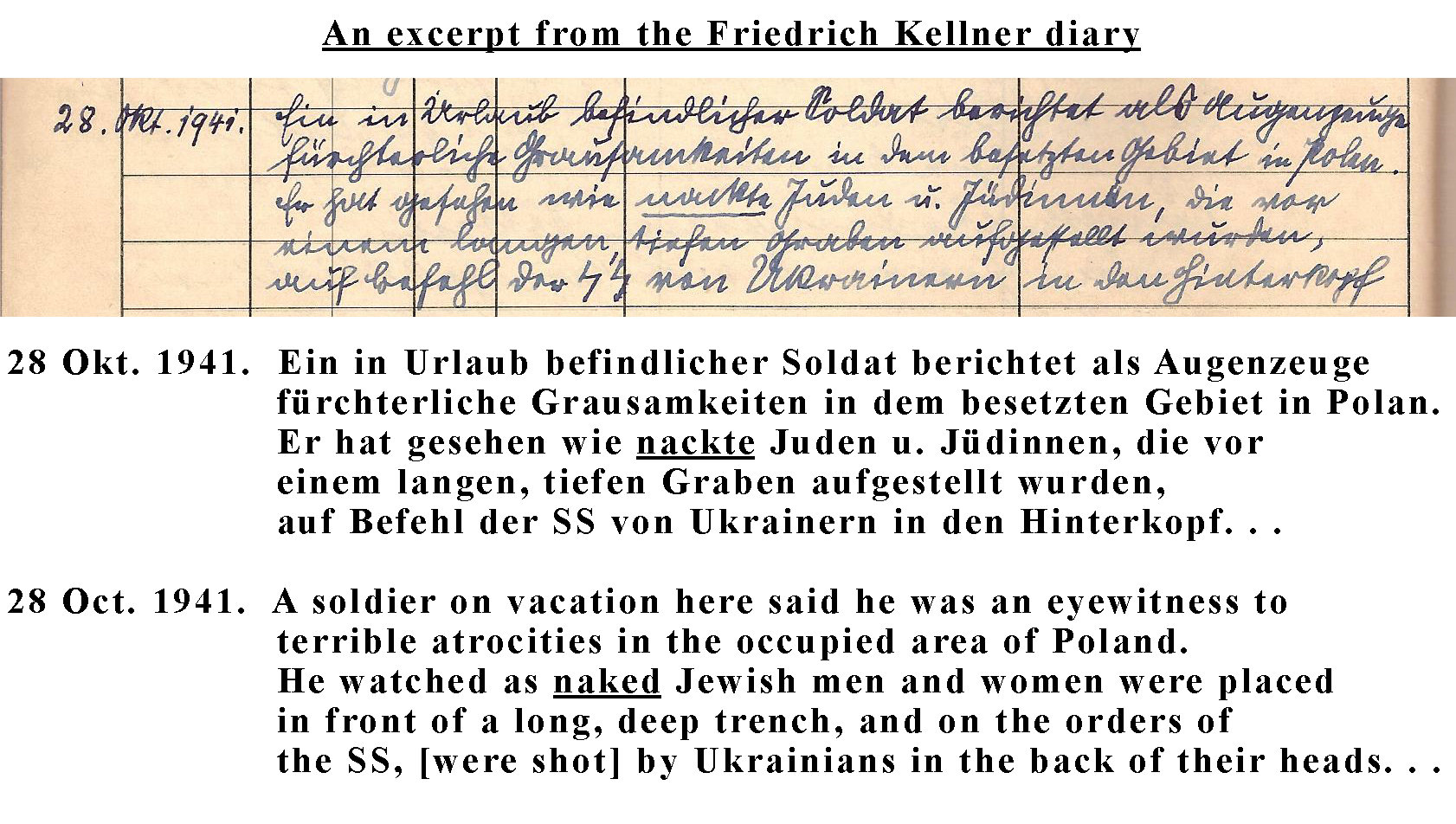
Part of the 28 October 1941 entry. Sütterlin script transcribed to modern German and translated into English.

One of the most important historical entries in the diary was written on 28 October 1941. Most Germans after the war would insist they knew nothing at all about the state-sponsored genocide of the Jews, yet very early in the war Kellner recorded this in his diary, showing that word of atrocities reached the average citizens even in the small towns:

A soldier on vacation here said he was an eyewitness to terrible atrocities in the occupied parts of Poland. He watched as naked Jewish men and women were placed in front of a long deep trench and upon the order of the SS were shot by Ukrainians in the back of their heads and they fell into the ditch. Then the ditch was filled with dirt even as he could hear screams coming from people still alive in the ditch.
These inhuman atrocities were so terrible that some of the Ukrainians, who were used as tools, suffered nervous breakdowns. All the soldiers who had knowledge of these bestial actions of these Nazi sub-humans were of the opinion that the German people should be shaking in their shoes because of the coming retribution.
There is no punishment that would be hard enough to be applied to these Nazi beasts. Of course, when the retribution comes, the innocent will have to suffer along with them. But because ninety-nine percent of the German population is guilty, directly or indirectly, for the present situation, we can only say that those who travel together will hang together.

=== After the war ===
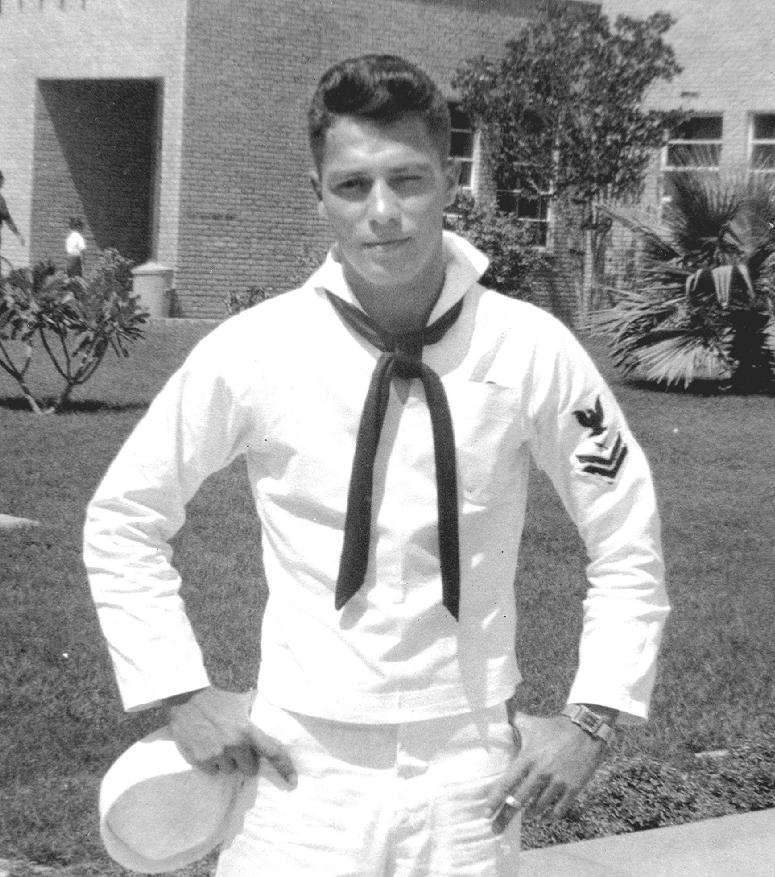
Robert Scott Kellner in 1960, who translated the diary into English.

The war came to an end for Kellner on 29 March 1945, when the Americans marched into Laubach. Only a few days earlier, beginning on 23 March 1945, in a series of coordinated events between the British and American forces, the Allies had crossed the Rhine River in their invasion of the German homeland. With the approval of the occupation forces, the new mayor of Laubach appointed Kellner deputy mayor. Kellner aided in the denazification process, which primarily meant removing former Nazis from positions of power in the region. Kellner helped to resurrect the Social Democratic Party in Laubach, and he became the regional party chairman.

Kellner wrote only a few more entries in the diary. In one of the last entries, on 8 May 1945, the day Germany officially surrendered to the Allies, Kellner noted:

"If now, after the collapse, should any of these lackeys of Adolf Hitler have the insolence to claim they were merely harmless onlookers, let them feel the scourge of avenging mankind .... Whoever cries about having lost the Nazi system or wants to resurrect National Socialism is to be treated as a lunatic."

Kellner served as chief justice inspector and administrator of the Laubach courthouse until 1948. He was appointed district auditor in the regional court in Giessen until his retirement in 1950. For the next three years he was a legal advisor in Laubach. In 1956 he returned to politics and was Laubach's leading councilor and deputy mayor until he retired in 1960 at age 75.

On 19 July 1966, Kellner received compensation from the Federal Republic of Germany because of the injustices committed against him during the time of National Socialism. The compensation ruling included this statement:

"Kellner's political opposition was recognized by the ruling powers and they took measures against him. In a memorandum dated 23 June 1937, they noted that Kellner had not been active enough for the National Socialist movement, and that he has caused disturbances with the local party. Further, the incidents in the year 1940 (the threatened incarceration in a concentration camp) had really an unfavorable effect. It was Kellner's open opposition to National Socialism which prevented possible promotions and damaged him in his service."

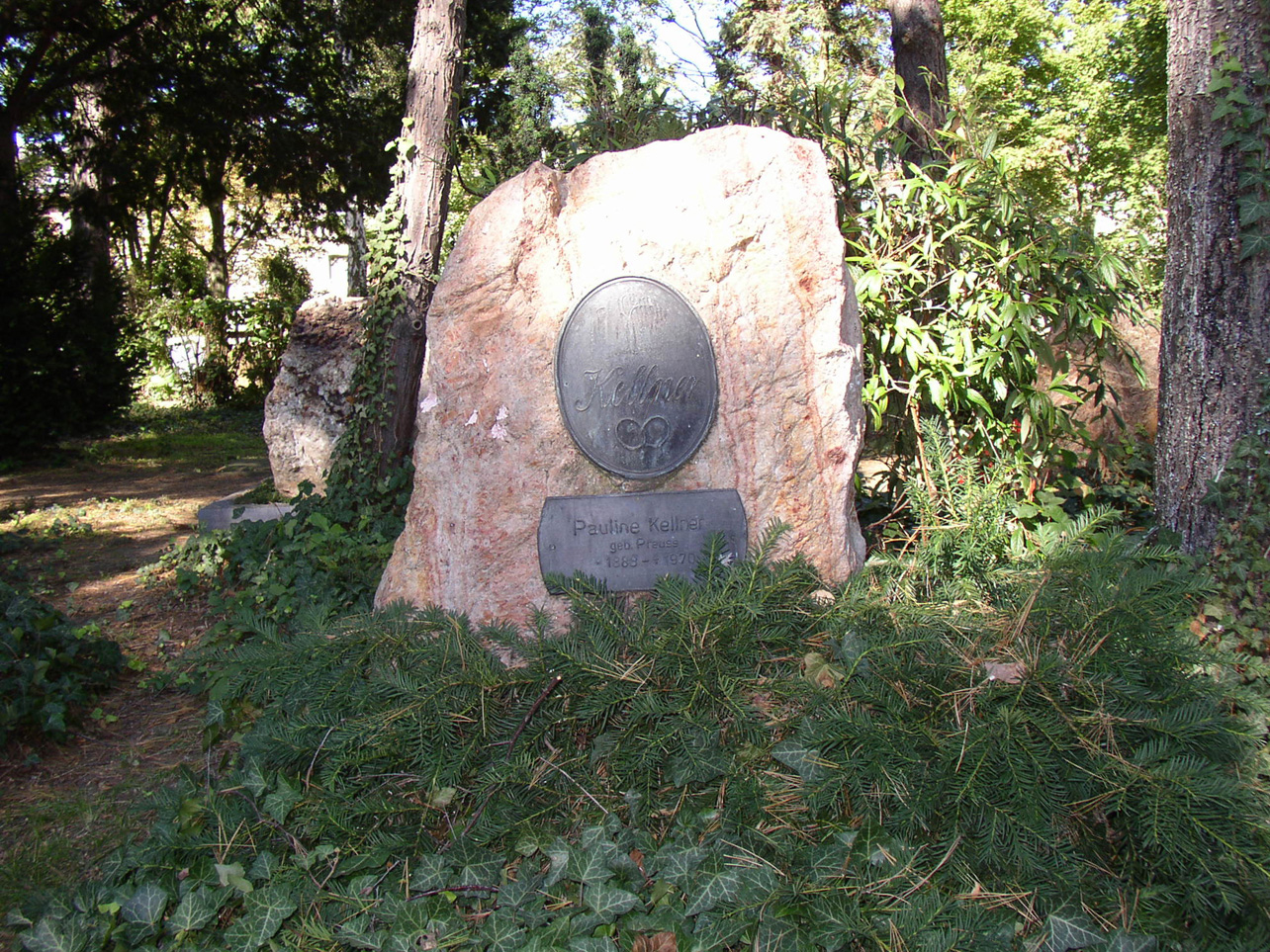
Kellner grave, Mainz

Kellner and his wife arranged to have their son, Fred William Kellner, sent to the United States in 1935 out of concern he might otherwise have to fight for Hitler. Fred William returned to Germany in 1945 as a member of the U.S. Army. He was unable to cope with the devastation he witnessed, and in 1953 he took his own life. He is buried in the American Legion Tomb in Neuilly, France, on the outskirts of Paris. Fred's son, Robert Scott Kellner, grew up in a children's home in Connecticut. In 1960, while in the United States Navy and traveling through Germany, Robert Scott Kellner located his grandparents, Friedrich and Pauline Kellner, and learned of the existence of the diary. In 1968, Friedrich Kellner gave his diary to his American grandson to translate and bring to the attention of the public. He believed his observations during World War II could have meaning in the increasing hostilities in the world brought about by the Cold War with Communism, and the proliferation of neo-Nazi cults.

Friedrich and Pauline Kellner spent their last few years in Mainz, where Kellner had first begun his service as a law administrator and a political activist. He served as a volunteer legal advisor in Mainz from 1962 until 1969. After Pauline's death on 8 February 1970, Friedrich returned to Laubach for the remaining few months of his life. He died on 4 November 1970, in the regional hospital in Lich, not far from Laubach. He was buried at the side of his wife at the Hauptfriedhof Mainz.

Decades later, Robert Scott Kellner would use the diary to combat the resurgence of fascism and anti-Semitism in the twenty-first century, and to counter historical revisionists who would deny the Holocaust and other Nazi atrocities. He offered a copy of the diary to the Iranian president, Mahmoud Ahmadinejad, who has referred to the Holocaust as "a myth" and has called for Israel to be "wiped off the map." In his offer to Ahmadinejad, Kellner said: "We need to renounce ideologies that do not uphold, above all else, human life and personal liberty."

== Works ==
=== Diary ===
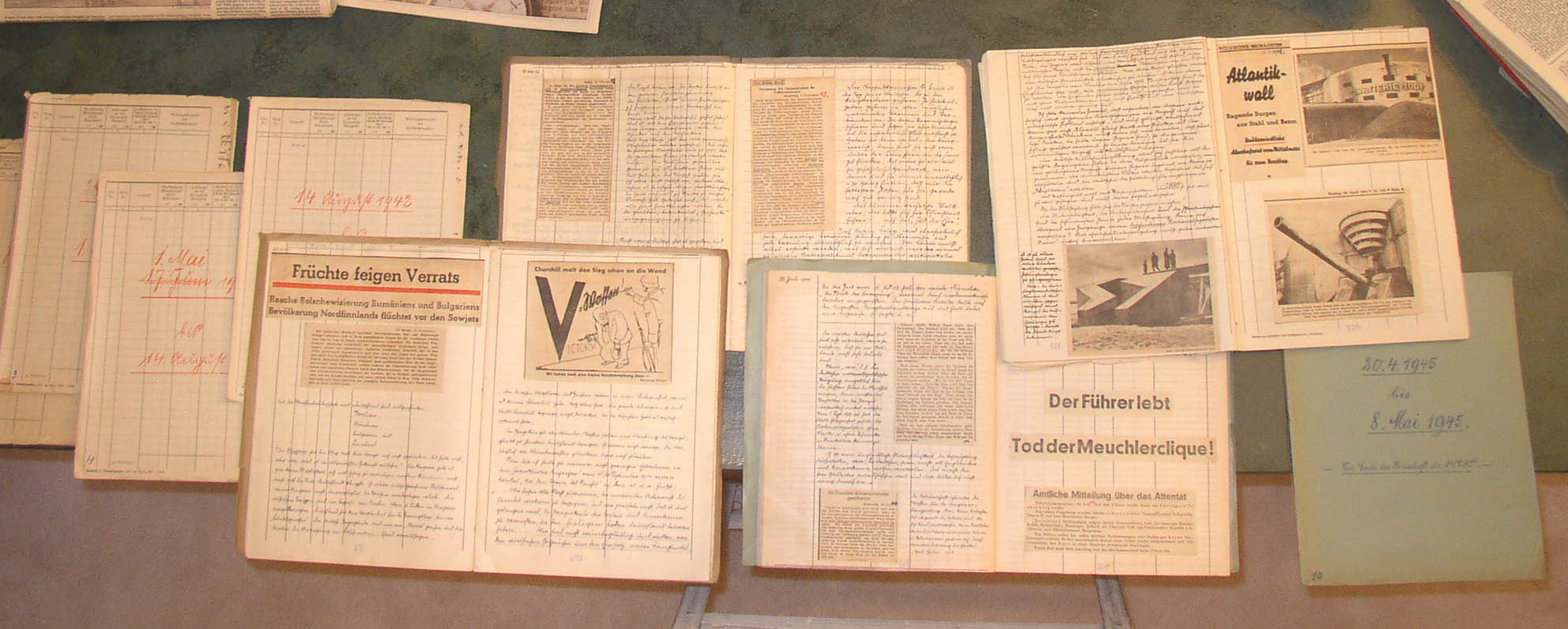
Volumes of the Friedrich Kellner Diary.

My Opposition consists of 10 volumes with a total of 861 pages. The volumes are sheets of accounting paper bound together by string. There are 676 individually dated entries beginning in September 1939 through May 1945. More than 500 newspaper clippings are pasted onto the pages of the diary. The diary is written in a script called Sütterlin, the old German handwriting which was banned in 1941 and replaced by modern Latin lettering to make German easier for the conquered nations of Europe to read and understand.

There are separate pages written in 1938 and 1939, considered preliminary pages to the diary, that explain Kellner's intentions. He meant for his observations to detail the events of those years, and to offer a prescription for future generations to prevent what occurred in Germany during Adolf Hitler's rise to power, when a fledgling democracy willingly embraced dictatorship to solve political disputes. Kellner foresaw Germany's defeat, and warned against a recurrence of totalitarianism. He prescribed unrelenting resistance against any ideology that threatened personal liberty and ignored the sanctity of human life.

The complete diary was published by Wallstein Verlag in Göttingen, Germany, in 2011. It consists of two volumes, approximately 1,200 pages, with over 70 illustrations and photographs. The title is "Friedrich Kellner, 'Vernebelt, verdunkelt sind alle Hirne,' Tagebücher 1939-1945."

The English translation of the diary was published in January 2018 by Cambridge University Press. Translated and edited by Robert Scott Kellner, it is a single volume hardback of 520 pages with 53 illustrations and photographs. The title is "My Opposition: The Diary of Friedrich Kellner -- A German against the Third Reich."

=== Reception of the diary ===
The diary's first public appearance was at the George Bush Presidential Library and Museum, where it was on display to commemorate the 60th anniversary of VE Day, the end of the war in Europe. It has since been exhibited in other museums in the United States and in Germany. In October 2007, an exhibit of diary facsimiles was at The Great Synagogue of Stockholm, in Stockholm, Sweden. In 2010, the original diary was displayed in an extensive exhibit at Friedrich Ebert Stiftung in Berlin and Bonn, Germany. This was followed by a seven-month exhibit in the U.S., May-December 2010 at Dwight Eisenhower Presidential Library and Museum in Abilene, Kansas, as part of the exhibit "Eisenhower and the Righteous Cause: The Liberation of Europe." In June 2018, the diary was exhibited at Yad Vashem, Jerusalem, Israel, in the International School for Holocaust Studies during the 10th International Conference on Holocaust Education. A permanent Kellner exhibit is at the Fridericianum museum in Laubach, Germany. Coincidentally, this museum is located on the same street as the courthouse where Kellner wrote the diary.

In Giessen, where Kellner worked as district auditor from 1948 to 1950, the Holocaust Literature Research Unit of the Justus Liebig University of Giessen has established the Kellner Project. The director of the group, Dr. Sascha Feuchert, considers Kellner's work one of the most extensive diaries of the Nazi period.

A number of major universities in the United States, such as Purdue, Columbia, and Stanford, have offered to make the diary part of their libraries. The directors of the Yad Vashem Holocaust Museum in Jerusalem and the United States Holocaust Memorial Museum in Washington, D.C., have also requested the diary for their archives.

In 2007, CCI Entertainment, a Canadian film company, produced a documentary film entitled My Opposition: The Diaries of Friedrich Kellner, which interweaves the stories of Kellner and his American grandson. The documentary had its American premiere at the George Bush Presidential Library on 26 September 2007. It was shown in the theater of the Dag Hammarskjöld Library at the United Nations on 10 November 2008 to commemorate the 70th anniversary of Kristallnacht.
