= Ute Steyer =

Rabbi in Sweden

Ute Steyer (born 1967) is a rabbi in Sweden, the first woman to serve as a rabbi in the country.

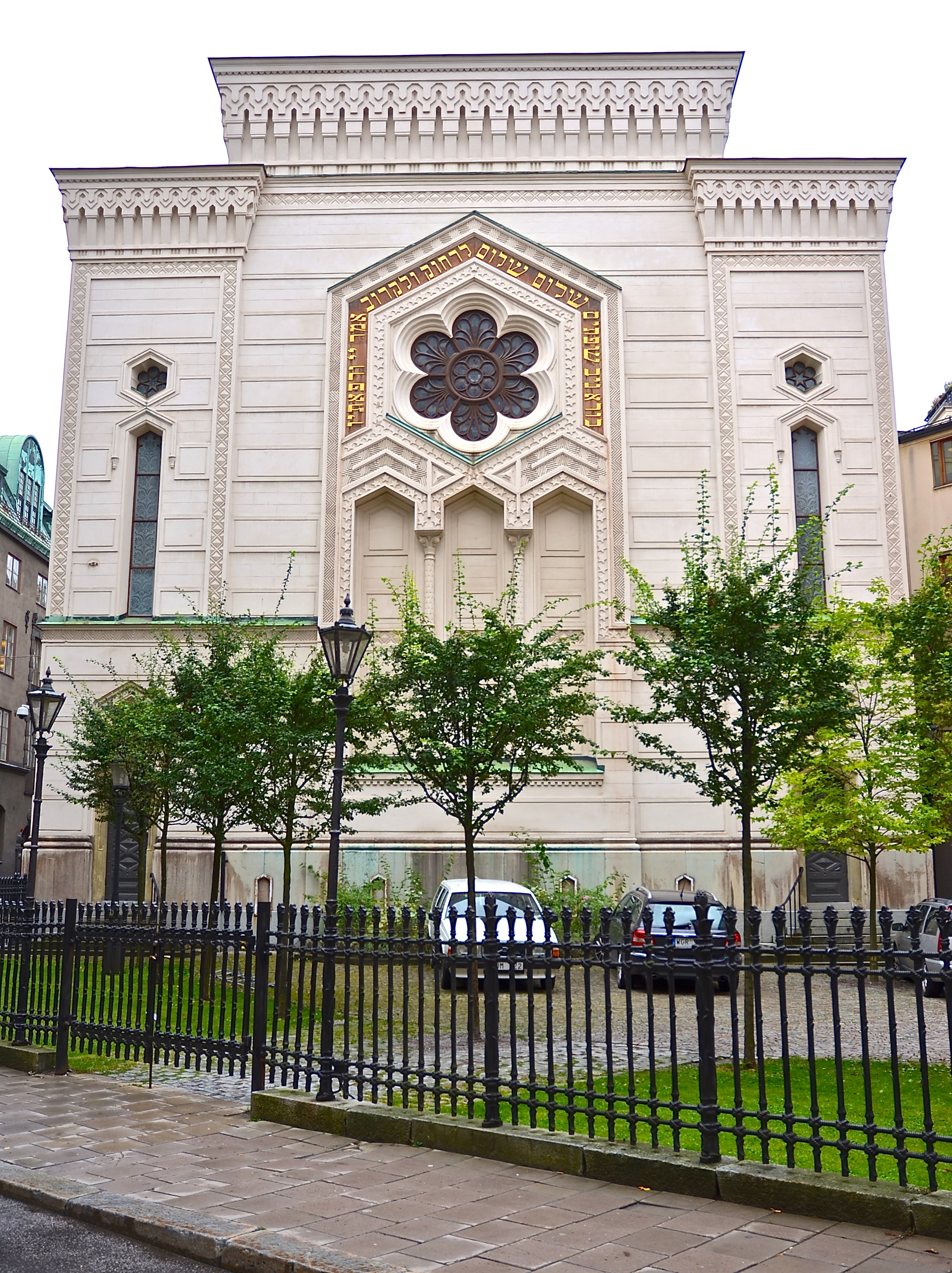
The Great Synagogue of Stockholm, which Steyer leads as Sweden's first female rabbi.

She is the rabbi of the Jewish Community of Stockholm and of the Great Synagogue of Stockholm, a Conservative congregation, which serves as the city's main synagogue and center of Jewish life. She also works at Paideia – The Institute for Jewish Studies in Sweden as the resident lecturer of talmud.

Steyer was born in 1967 and grew up in London, Athens, and Berlin, as her parents were diplomats and moved frequently.

After working for Ericsson and the Chamber of Commerce in Stockholm in the 1990s and studying at Lund University, during which time she became fluent in Swedish, she chose to become a rabbi. She was ordained in 2009, through the Jewish Theological Seminary of America in New York, and graduated with a master's degree in Jewish philosophy. She then worked at Yeshiva University's Center for Jewish Law and the Jewish Theological Seminary of America, before moving back to Sweden after 15 years in New York.

When she took over as the Great Synagogue's rabbi in January 2015, she became the first female rabbi in Swedish history. She attributed the delay in the country reaching this landmark to the small size of the Swedish Jewish community.

During the COVID-19 pandemic in 2020, she led her congregation in the first virtual services of the Great Synagogue's 150-year history.

== See also ==
- Timeline of women rabbis
