= Juan de la Cerda =

Juan de la Cerda may refer to:

- Juan de la Cerda, 2nd Duke of Medinaceli (1485–1544)
- Juan de la Cerda, 4th Duke of Medinaceli (c. 1514–1575)
- Juan de la Cerda, 5th Duke of Medinaceli (1544–1594)
- Juan de la Cerda, 6th Duke of Medinaceli (1569–1607)
- Juan de la Cerda, 8th Duke of Medinaceli (1637–1691)
