= Duke of Bivona =

Dukedom of Spain

The Sicilian title Duke of Bivona stems from the middle 16th century. Bivona is in Sicily, which had been conquered by Peter III of Aragon in 1282. It was given to people related to the powerful medieval Aragonese family of de Luna.

The 12th Duke of Bivona ceded the title to his younger brother, José María Álvarez de Toledo y Palafox, who obtained recognition, as a title of the Kingdom of Spain, from Queen Isabel II of Spain, as the 1st Duke of Bivona, granting him the Grandeeship of Spain on 7 July 1865..

== List of Dukes of Bivona ==
This is the list of Dukes of Bivona :

	Holder	Period
Title of the Kingdom of Sicily
I	Pedro de Luna y Peralta	1555-1575
II	Pedro Julio de Luna y Peralta	1575-1592
III	Luisa de Luna y Peralta	1592-1619
IV	Antonio de Aragón y Moncada	1619-1631
V	Luis Guillén de Moncada y Aragón	1631-1672
VI	Fernando de Aragón y Moncada	1672-1713
VII	Catalina de Moncada y Aragón	1713-1727
VIII	Fadrique Álvarez de Toledo y Moncada	1727-1753
IX	Antonio Álvarez de Toledo y Pérez de Guzmán	1753-1773
X	José Álvarez de Toledo y Gonzaga	1773-1796
XI	Francisco de Borja Álvarez de Toledo y Gonzaga	1796-1821
XII	Pedro de Alcántara Álvarez de Toledo y Palafox	1821-1865
Title of the Kingdom of Spain
I	José María Álvarez de Toledo y Palafox	1865-1885
II	José María Álvarez de Toledo y Acuña	1885-1898
III	Tristán Álvarez de Toledo y Gutiérrez de la Concha	1898-1926
IV	Silvia Álvarez de Toledo y Gutiérrez de la Concha	1926-1932
	Vacant	1932-1956
V	Manuel Falcó y Anchorena	1956-actual holder

== "de Luna" dukes and duchess (1554–1619) ==
=== 1st Duke of Bivona ===
The title was bestowed on 22 May 1554 to Pedro de Luna – Peralta y Medici-Salviati, (c. 1520–1575), who had married Isabel de Vega y Osorio, (born c1525), daughter of the Ambassador Juan de Vega y Enríque, and Leonor Perez – Osorio y Sarmiento, (died 30 March 1550, Palermo). He was 10th Count of Caltabellotta, and also Count (Conte in Italian) of Calatafimi, Sclafani, and Caltavuturo. Two of their children were 2nd and 3rd Dukes of Bivona.

=== 2nd Duke of Bivona ===
Piero Giulio de Luna e Vega (Pedro Julio) in 1575 became 2nd Duke of Bivona and 11th Count of Caltabellota. He married the Spanish "Angela De la Cerda y Manuel" in 1562, daughter of Juan II de la Cerda, 4th Duke of Medinaceli. He died in 1592.

=== 1st Duchess of Bivona ===
Aloisia de Luna e Vega, (3rd Duchess of Bivona by her own rights), (deceased Caltanissetta, 1619). The Duchess, was named after her grandmother, an Italian Salviati–Medici woman, sister of Pope Leo X "Medici",

In 1568 Duchess Aloisia married Cesare Moncada – Aragona y Pignatelli, 2nd Prince of Paternò, Count of Adernò, Count of Sclafani, Count of Caltabellota, Vicario generale y capitano d’arme nelle città di Siracusa e Catania, (+ Caltgirone July 1591).

Cesare Moncada, the Duke Consort, was the son of Don Francesco Moncada, Count of Adernò, Count of Sclafani (con la terra di Caltavuturo e Scillato), Count of Caltanissetta, 1st Prince of Paternò, (1518 – married 1532 – + 23 February 1568) and of Caterina Pignatelli, the daughter of Camillo Pignatelli, Count of Borello, 3rd duca di Monteleone, (+ 28 March 1583), and Donna Girolama Colonna, the daughter of the 2nd duca di Paliano.

Nine years later, Aloisia, not a widow yet from her supposed 1st husband till 1591, seems to have married widower Don Antonio d’Aragona y Folch de Cardona, (1543 – Naples, Italy, 8 February 1583), 4th Duke of Montalto, Count of Collesano or Golisano.

== "Moncada de Aragón", Dukes and Duchess (1619–1728) ==
=== 3rd Duke of Bivona ===
The 3rd Duke of Bivona was Francesco (13 March 1572 – Martos, Province of Jaén, 1595, aged 23) He was son of Cesare de Moncada and Aloisia de Luna. He was also 3rd Prince of Paternò, Count of Adernò, Count of Caltanisseta, Count of Caltabellotta.

On 12 March 1584, at the age of almost 12, Francesco married the orphan Lady Donna Maria d’Aragona y de la Cerda, 5th duchess of Montalto, Contessa di Collesano (died 2 December 1610). She was:

- the daughter of the 4th Duke of Montalto and Count of Colisano, Antonio d’Aragona – Folch de Cardona (died 8 February 1583);
- granddaughter through her mother's side of Juan II de la Cerda, 4th duke of Medinaceli de Medinaceli, 4th Count of Puerto de Santa María, 3rd Marquis of Cogolludo, (around 1505 – Madrid, 1 August 1575), Viceroy of Captain General of Sicily and Navarre;
- also granddaughter of the Portuguese noblewoman Joana Manuel, or Juana de Noronha Manuel (died Pamplona, Navarre, 19 June 1568), of the family of the six Counts of Odemira.

=== 4th Duke of Bivona ===
The 4th Duke of Bivona was Don Antonio de Moncada y Aragón (1589 – 15 April 1631, aged 42), awarded the Grandee of Spain at age 6 and the succession to the titles when his father Francesco died aged 23 at Martos (Jaén, Spain). He was also 4th Prince of Paternò, 6th Duke of Montalto, Count of Adernò con Centorbi e Biancavilla, Count of Sclafani, Count of Caltanissetta, Count of Caltabellotta, Count of Collesano, and other Italian titles.

Antonio de Moncada, 4th Duke of Bivona, married again within the "De la Cerda" family, the father of his father-in-law being his uncle, i.e. his mothers brother, named Juan Luis de la Cerda y Manuel de Portugal, (1544 – married 1565 – married again 1580 – 29 May 1594), 5th Duke of Medinaceli, 5th Count of Puerto de Santa María, 4th Marquis of Cogolludo, Ambassador in Portugal, Grandee of Spain, a Knight of the Order of the Golden Fleece in 1585.

His father-in-law was the Spanish-Italian known to Spanish genealogists as Juan de la Cerda y Aragón, (Cogolludo, province of Guadalajara, Spain, 1569 – 8 December 1607, aged 38), 6th Duke of Medinaceli, 6th Conde del Puerto de Santa María, 5th Marqués de Cogolludo, a Knight of the Order of the Golden Fleece in 1599. He married twice, the first on 21 November 1580 with his step sister, Ana de la Cueva y de la Lama, a daughter of Gabriel de la Cueva, 5th Duke of Alburquerque, and Juana de la Lama. His second marriage, circa 1606, brought about the much-wanted male inheritor of the Medinaceli Dukedom and lands thereto in Spain.

It was a daughter of this couple, the one from the first marriage, Juana de la Cerda y de la Lama, (born September 1591), the wife of the 4th Duke of Bivona, aforementioned.

It seems as if this marriage was declared void, although the couple was alive around 1626, with Juana, the Duchess Consort, being around 35 years old and the Duke Don Antonio de Moncada, some 37, and that the Duke "received the call of God" to be a Jesuit and then renounced to honours, titles and privileges to follow San Ignacio de Loyola, (before 23 October 1491 – 31 July 1556), heavenly calls. The Duke died in 1631, aged 42.

=== 5th Duke of Bivona ===
Nevertheless, their first male inheritor after Don Antonio mystical call of 1626, is known to some genealogists as Luis Guillermo de Moncada y de la Cerda, a.k.a. Luis de Moncada) was also 7th Duque de Montalto, 5th Prince of Paternò, Knight of the Order of Alcantara (1630), a Captain General and Viceroy of Sardinia, 1644, Knight of the Order of the Golden Fleece (1651).

This 5th Duke of Bivona was born in Collesano (1.1.1614). He achieved the status of Grandee of Spain in 1631, aged 17, became after 1638 a childless widower of Maria Enriquez Afan de Ribera, the 4th Duchess of Alcalá de los Gazules and 7th Marchioness of Tarifa, marrying then another collateral, Catalina de Moncada y Alagón, (21 August 1611 – deceased 1660), the daughter of Francisco de Moncada, (1586 – Grandee of Spain in 1626 – Battle of Goch 1635), 3rd Marqués de Aytona, 11th Count of Osona, and Margarita de Alagón – Espés, Marchioness of Puebla de Castro in Aragón, (deceased 1624).

When his second wife, Catalina, died towards the end of 1660, he became a priest around 1662, being promoted to the honour of Cardinal without title of the Holy Roman Church on 7 March 1667, dying while staying in Madrid on 4 March 1672, five years later.

=== 6th Duke of Bivona ===
A male baby from the first marriage and another two males from the second one did not reach adult status, being thus 8th Duque de Montalto, 6th Duque de Bivona, 6th Principe de Paternò, and some half a dozen of Italian counties plus a handful of lesser titles Fernando Moncada de Aragón y Moncada, (20 October 1644 – married 1665, aged 21 – Grandee of Spain from 1672 when his father, late Cardinal of the Roman Catholic Church, died – 11 November 1713).

The 6th Duke of Bivona would be the last male member bearing the family name Moncada de Aragón:

Fernando de Moncada – Aragón married in 1665 the powerful heiress María Teresa Fajardo y Alvarez de Toledo – Portugal, 7th Marchioness de los Vélez, 6th Marchioness of Molina de Segura, 3rd Marchioness of Martorell, Grandee of Spain by inheritance since 1697, with extensive lands, military honorary titles, and agricultural mills in Murcia, Lorca and Catalan areas.

Her father, Pedro Fajardo de Zúñiga y Recqueséns, (Mula, province of Murcia, June 1602 – Palermo, Sicilia, 3 November 1647) had been 4th Marquis of Molina de Segura, 5th marquis de los Vélez, big land owner from Murcia married to the powerful Catalan -Italian family of the Recquesens, Captain General of the so-called Kingdom of Murcia, Viceroy of Aragon, Navarre, Catalonia and Sicily, Ambassador of Spain in Rome, President of the "Consejo de Indias", the administrative body keeping track of several million square kilometers, thousands of priests and nuns in America as well as hundreds of thousands of new settlers there and millions of Indian Aborigines more or less protected by the Imperial Crown.

Her mother, second wife of Don Pedro Fajardo de Zúñiga, had been María Engracia Alvarez de Toledo – Portugal y Pimentel, (deceased 1 January 1696), daughter of Fernando Álvarez de Toledo – Portugal, 6th Count of Oropesa, Count de Deleitosa, 2nd Marquis de Frechilla y Villarramiel, and of Mencía Pimentel, daughter of the 8th condes-duques de Benavente, a Portuguese family who had settled in Spain at the end of the 14th century.

=== 2nd Duchess of Bivona ===
The 2nd (Duchess) of Bivona was also 9th Duchess of Montalto, 8th Marchioness de los Vélez, Marchioness of Molina de Segura, Marchioness of Martorell, and over a dozen of other lesser titles (Counties, Baronetcies, and Lordships in Spain and in Italy) succeeded in her own right through a lack of male inheritors. Teresa Caterina Moncada de Aragon y Fajardo, (1665 – 29 January 1728), was baptized in Madrid on 4 November 1665; married in October 1680, aged 15, but was widowed without issue and remarried on 29 September 1683, aged 18.

Her husband was José Fadrique Álvarez de Toledo y Fernández de Córdoba, 8th Marqués de Villafranca del Bierzo, 3rd Marqués de Villanueva de Valdueza, 5th Duque de Fernandina, and 5th Prince of Montalbano (deceased 30 July 1728).

He was the son of Fadrique III Alvarez de Toledo y Osorio, 7th Marquis of Villafranca del Bierzo, Grandee of Spain, 2nd Marquis of Villanueva de Valdueza, 4th Duke of Fernandina, 4th Prince of Montalbano, Captain General of the Spanish Galleys, Viceroy of Sicily, member of the Council of State, (27 February 1635 – 1705), and of Manuela Fernández de Córdoba y Cardona, (deceased 1679), the daughter of Antonio de Córdoba, 7 Duke of Sessa, 9 Count of Cabra, and of Teresa Pimentel, from the 9 Counts – Dukes of Benavente.

== From "Alvarez de Toledo" (1728–1802) ==
=== 7th Duke of Bivona ===
The succession, from her second marriage, including between the titles the one of 7th Duke of Bivona was handled then to her son, with different family name taking his father family name, his father being the Duke Consort José Fadrique:

Fadrique Vicente Álvarez de Toledo y Moncada, (Madrid, 5 April 1686 – Madrid, 12 November 1753), 9th Marqués de Villafranca del Bierzo, 7th Duque de Bivona, 9th Duque de Montalto, 9th Marqués de los Vélez, 8th Prince of Paternò, 6th Duque de Fernandina, 6th Prince of Montalbano, 4th Marqués de Villafranca de Valdueza, 4th Conde de Peña Ramiro, 12th Marqués de Molina, 5th Marqués de Martorell, 15th Count of Adernò, 16th Count of Caltabellota, 15th Count of Sclafani, 12th Count of Collesano, 13th Count of Caltanisseta, 18th Count of Centorvi, four times a Grandee of Spain, Barón of Castellví de Rosanes, Adelantado mayor del Reino de Murcia, Alcaide perpetuo de los Reales Alcázares de Lorca and many other honorary military titles such as Knight of the Golden Fleece in 1750, fell over his shoulders.

He married in 1713, aged 27, the impressive noblewoman described by genealogists as Juana Pérez de Guzmán y Silva while others call her with the somewhat baroque name of Juana Pérez de Guzmán el Bueno y Silva – Mendoza (after circa 1681 – ????).

She was one daughter of the Spanish Portuguese family constituted by Manuel Alonso Pérez de Guzmán, 12th Duque de Medina Sidonia, 17th Conde de Niebla, 11th Marqués de Cazaza, Grandee of Spain, (Huelva 1671 – ????), and Luisa María de Silva y Mendoza, (Madrid 25 August 1680 – ????)), daughter of Gregorio María Domingo de Silva Mendoza y Sandoval, 5th Duque de Pastrana, 5th Duque de Estremera, 9th Duque del Infantado, and of María de Haro y Guzmán, from the 6th Marqués del Carpio.

=== 8th Duke of Bivona ===
Antonio Álvarez de Toledo y Pérez de Guzmán 8th Duke of Bivona, son of the 7th Duke was born in Madrid on 24 September 1716. He was invested as a Knight of the Golden Fleece in 1763 and also became Gran Cruz de la Orden de Carlos III in the same year. He held many other Dukedoms, Marquees, Counties, and lesser titles. He died in Madrid on 4 December 1773, aged 57.

He married firstly Teresa, daughter of the 10th Duke of Medina Sidonia in September 1735, (one daughter); and secondly married Maria Antonia Gonzaga Caracciolo, daughter of the Duke of Solferino, (two females and two males)

=== 9th Duke of Bivona ===
Joé María (Madrid, 16 July 1756 – Sevilla 9 June 1798), the first male son of the 2nd marriage of the 8th Duke, inherited the title. By the time of his death in 1798, he was holder of six Grandees of Spain, four Dukedoms (the Medina Sidonia Duchy from a childless cousin, a Perez de Guzmán y Pacheco, and the Duchy of Alba through marriage to the famed Cayetana de Alba, one of the widowed aristocrat women friends of Court Painter Francisco de Goya), two Principalities, eight Marquisates, eight Countships, two Baronetcies, and many other lesser titles, (Spanish and Italian). Together with the Dukes of Osuna, the Tellez-Girón family, he became one of the biggest private land owners in Andalusia.

=== 10th Duke of Bivona, (1802–1821) ===
The 10th Dukedom of Bivona, (1802–1821), and 16th Dukedom of Medina Sidonia was a setback in the hereditary line: with no issue from the 9th Duke of Bivona and the 13th Duchess of Alba de Tormes, the Dukedom of Bivona would then go back one generation, sometime after 1802, when Duchess Cayetana died aged 40, four years after she has become a widow of Don Antonio, aged 42, in such a way that the 10th Duque de Bivona would be the uncle of José Maria, brother of the 10th Duke Antonio, named Francisco de Borja Álvarez de Toledo y Gonzaga-Caracciolo, (Madrid, 9 June 1763 – married, aged 35, Madrid, 28 January 1798, 18-year-old Maria Tomasa de Palafox y Portocarrero – Successor to the Dukedom of Bivona and connected family titles after 1802 – Madrid 12 February 1821, aged 57).

This Maria Tomasa, (Madrid, 8 March 1780 – married aged 18 on 28 January 1798 – a widow in 1821, aged 41 – Portici, Italy, 14 October 1835, aged 55), was a daughter of deceased Lieutenant General Felipe Antonio de Palafox y Croy, (San Sebastián 3 July 1739 – married before 1780, aged 40 or so-Madrid 24 October 1790), son of the 6th Marqués de Ariza, and of María Francisca de Sales Portocarrero y López de Zúñiga, 7th Countess of Montijo, 6th Countess of Fuentidueña, 11th Marchioness de la Algaba, 12th Marchioness de Ardales, 13th Countess de Teba, Marchioness de Osera, Grandee of Spain, (Madrid, 10 June 1754 – married before 1780, aged 25 or so – Lograno (¿Logroño?) 15 April 1808).

The 17th Duque de Media Sidonia would be then the eldest male son from this couple, namely:

Pedro de Alcantara Alvarez de Toledo y Palafox, (Madrid 11 May 1803 – married Madrid 9 October 1822 – Madrid 10 January 1867), with many other titles.

== Split of Medina Sidonia and Bivona Dukedoms ==
=== 11th Duke of Bivona ===
The "Alvarez de Toledo" family blocks successions: 11. Therefore, the 11th Duke of Bivona, 14th Count of Niebla, and many family connected titles was, apparently, the young teenager Duke, Pedro de Alcantara younger sibling:

Francisco Alvarez de Toledo y Palafox (Madrid, 9 June 1799 – Madrid, 31 January 1816, aged 16 only).

It seems that, for some reason, the eldest brother, Pedro de Alcántara, inherited a part of the titles with the 15th-century title of Dukedom of Medina Sidonia, while another part went to the unfortunate younger brother Francisco, in spite that their father died in 1821.

The outcome was then a succession; the 14th Duke of Bivona, and annexed titles, passed to the third male alive in the family Alvarez de Toledo-Palafox.

=== 12th Duke of Bivona ===
José María Alvarez de Toledo y Palafox, described as "Giuseppe" by Italian genealogists, Grandee of Spain, (Cádiz, Spain, 1 February 1812 – married in Paris, France, 22 June 1837, aged 25, 20 years old María del Carmen Lucía de Acuña y Dewitte, (Paris 22 June 1817,(¿?) – Naples, Italy, 15 January 1888, aged 71) – Naples, Italy, 7 January 1885, aged 72).

=== 13th Duke of Bivona ===
The 13th Duke of Bivona would be José María Álvarez de Toledo y Acuña, (Paris, France, 6 August 1838 – married in San Sebastian, Spain, on 21 August 1864, aged 26, the 16-year-old only lady thereto described as "Jacinta" – Madrid, 31 August 1898, aged 60).

Sixteen-year-old "Doña Jacinta", the 13th Duchess Consort, was the daughter of a most significant General Governor of the Spanish Island of Cuba, José Gutierrez de la Concha e Irigoyen, (Cordoba, Argentina, 1809–1895) and also the uterine sister of another "Doña Jacinta", the wife of one of the more significant "Military and Politician" Generals of 19th-century Spain, Baldomero Espartero, (27 February 1793 – 8 January 1879).
