= Castle of Medinaceli =

Medieval fortress in Castile and León, Spain

Coordinates: 41.1698°N 2.4369°W

Medinaceli Castle
- Castillo de Medinaceli
- Soria; Near Medinaceli in Spain
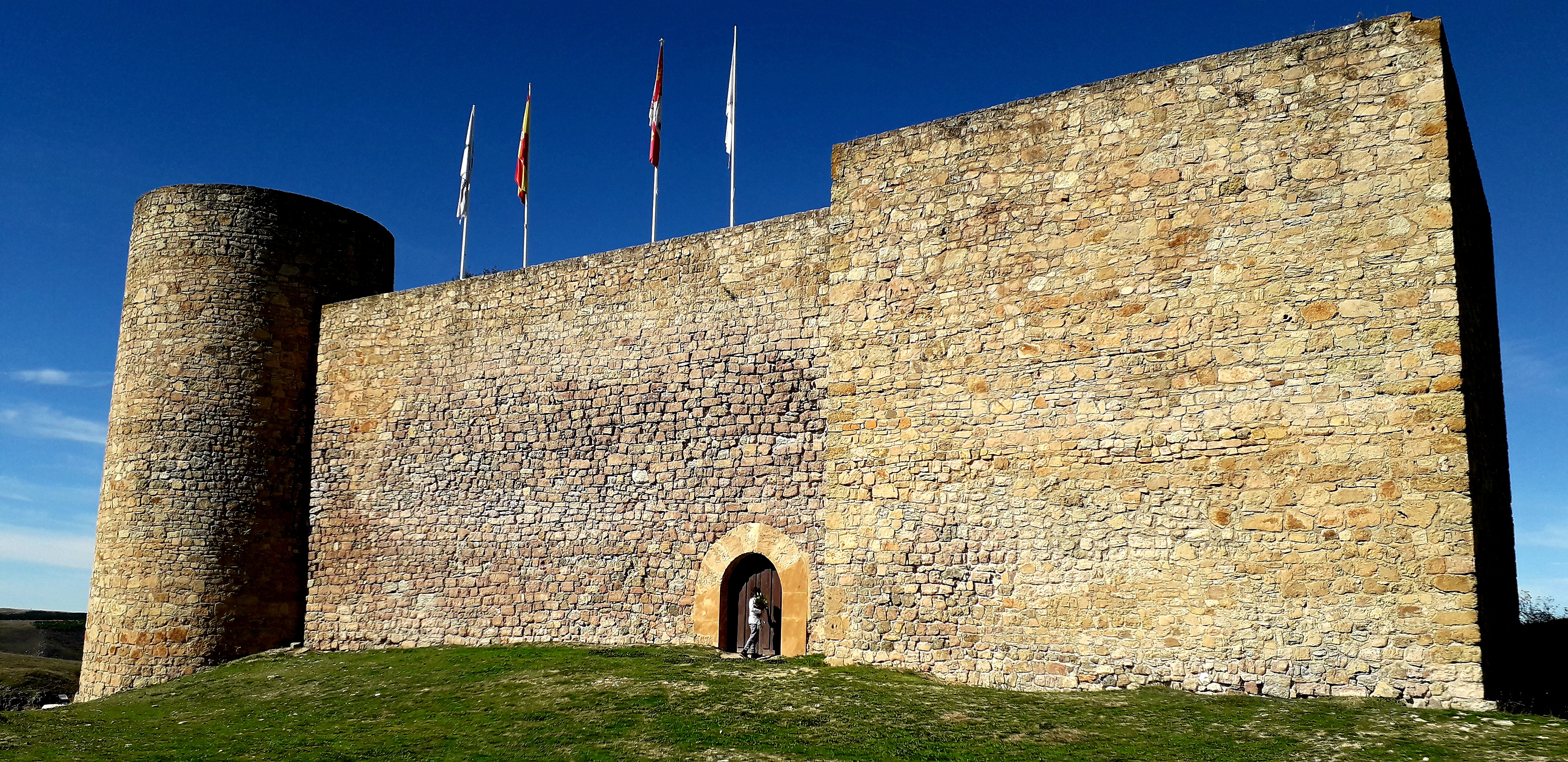

Site information
- Type: Castle
- Open to the public: Yes
- Condition: Good
- Website: www.sorianitelaimaginas.com/patrimonio/castillo-de-medinaceli

Site history
- Built: IX century

The Castle of Medinaceli is a medieval fortress in Medinaceli (Province of Soria, Castile and León, Spain). It was built in the 9th century and rebuilt in the 15th century. Almanzor died here in 1002.

== History ==
Medinaceli is located at the southern end of the province of Soria, on an elevated site and crossroads that was already significant since pre-Roman times. The Arabic name highlights its importance to the Muslims, who defended it even after the fall of Toledo to Christian forces.

Enrique II of Trastámara granted it as a Lordship to Bernal de Foix, 1st Count of Medinaceli, who was married to Isabel de la Cerda. Their descendants adopted the surname de la Cerda. Luis de la Cerda was elevated to the rank of Duke of Medinaceli by the Catholic Monarchs in 1479, and he was responsible for various reforms in the town and the construction of the Ducal Palace. The Dukes of Medinaceli resided in the castle before the construction of the Palace.

Under Don Luis de la Cerda y de la Vega, the 1st Duke of Medinaceli, Don Diego López de Medrano from Soria, who died before 1482, was appointed as the alcaide (governor) of the castle of Medinaceli.

== Gallery ==
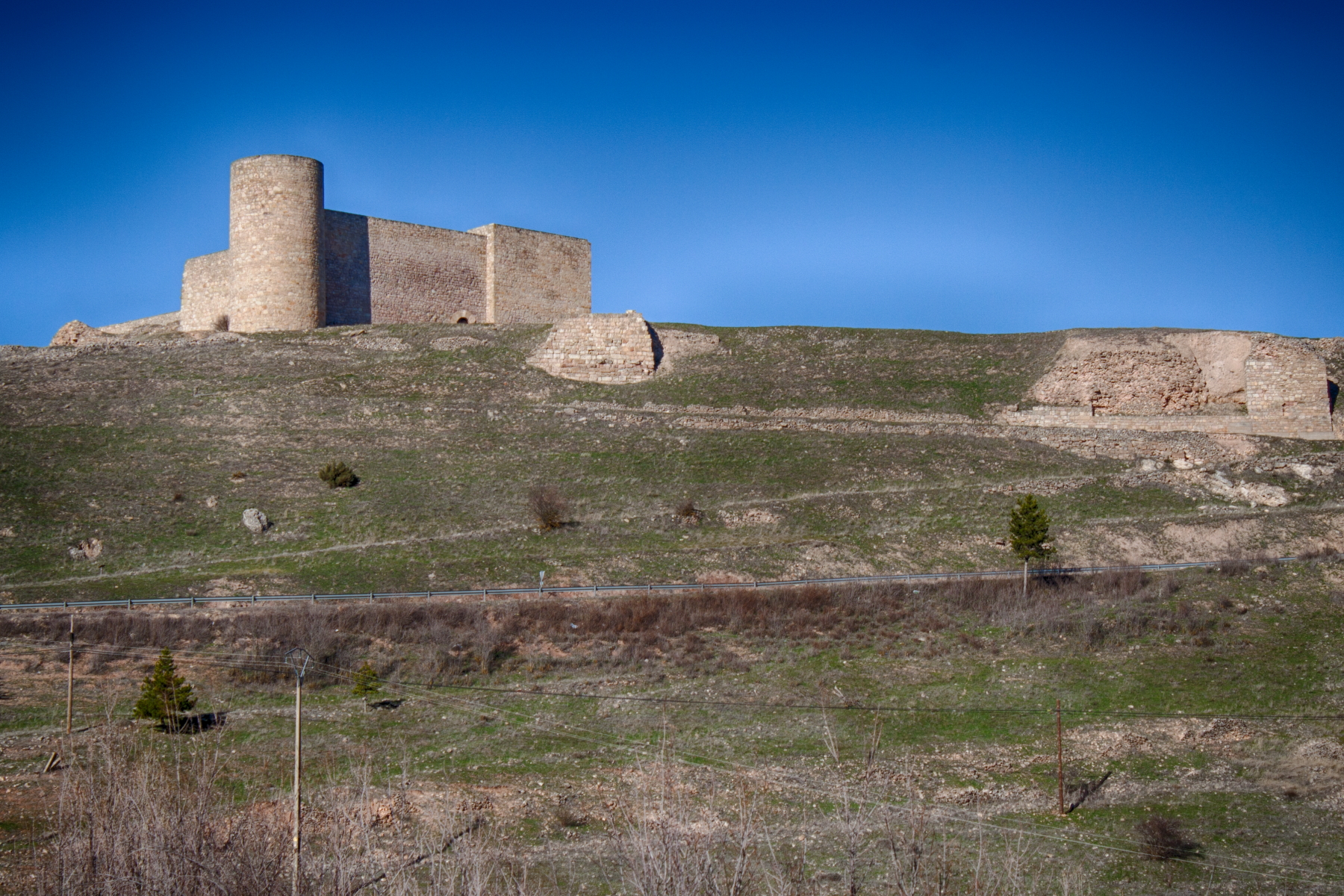
General view

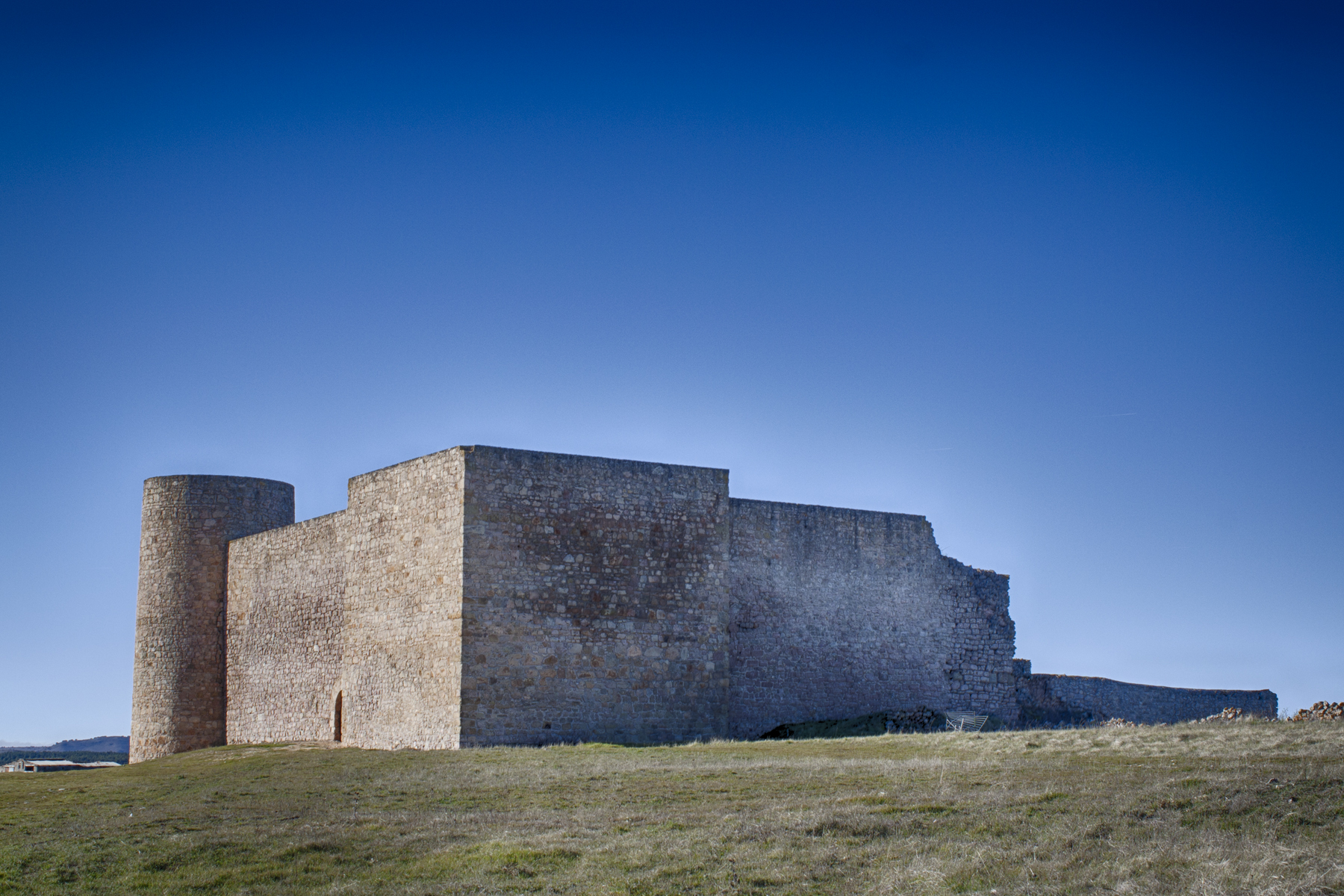
Torre del homenaje

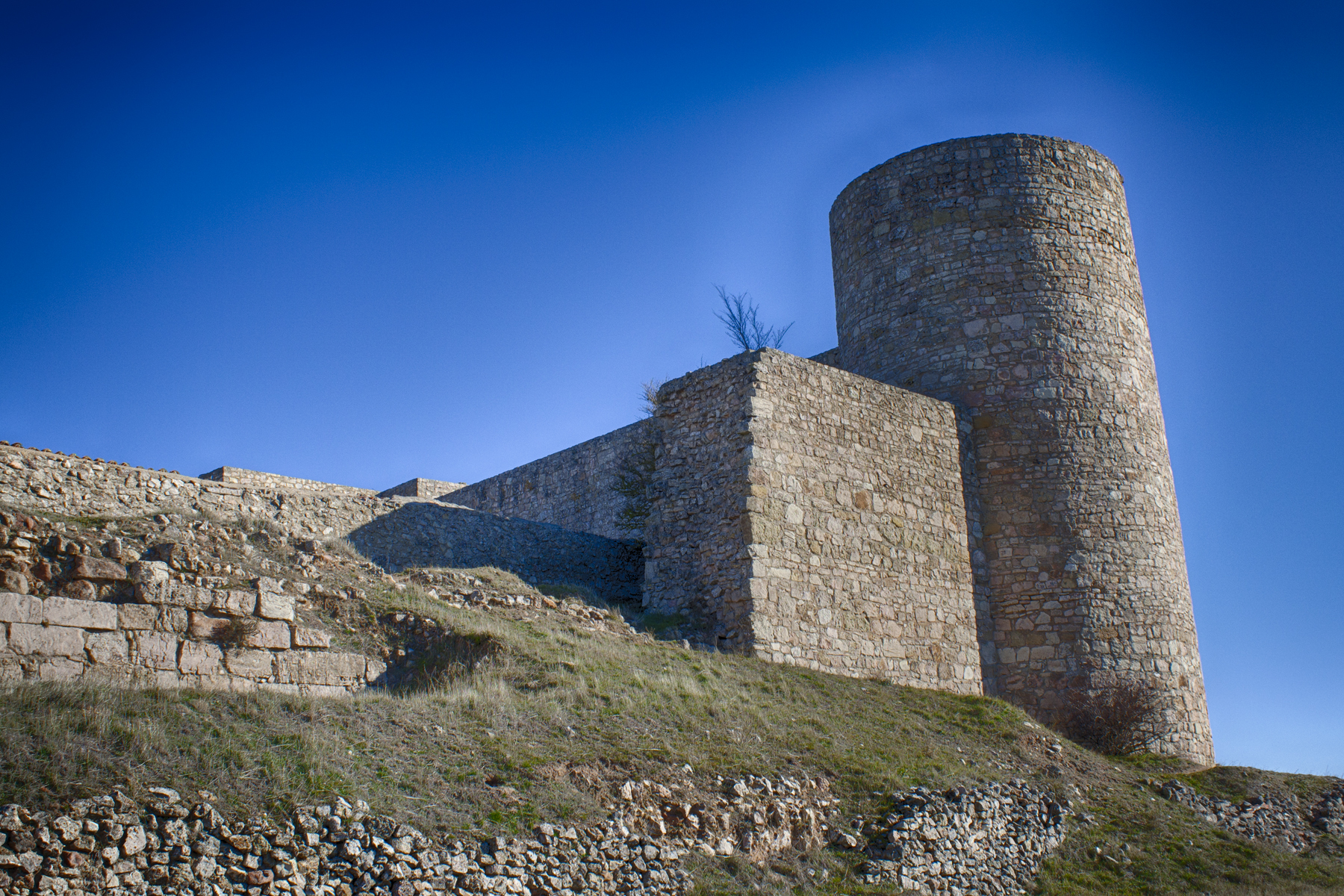
Torre circular

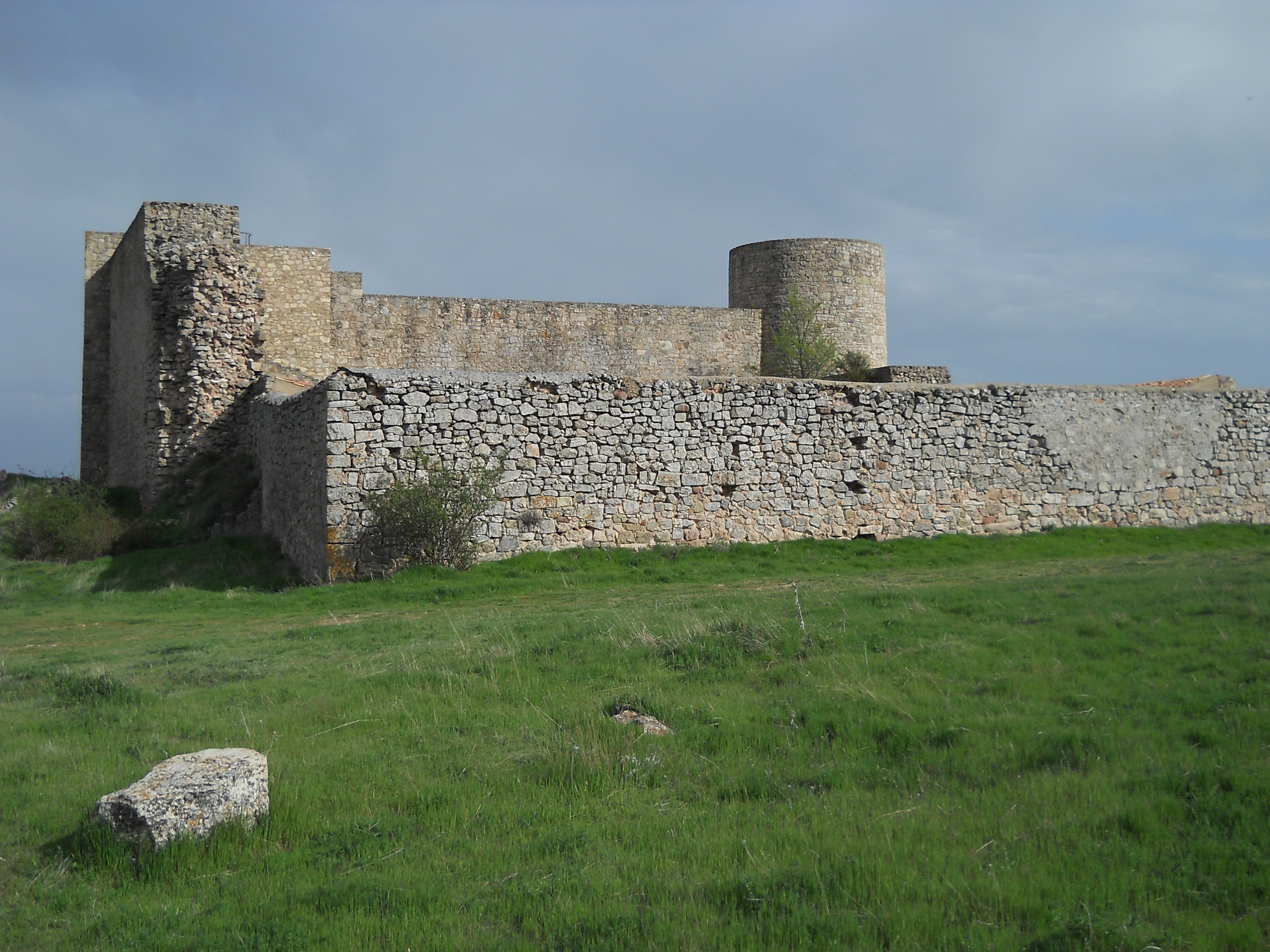
Back view

== See also ==
- List of castles in Spain
