= Plaça del Duc de Medinaceli =

Square in central Barcelona

Coordinates: 41.378203°N 2.179273°E

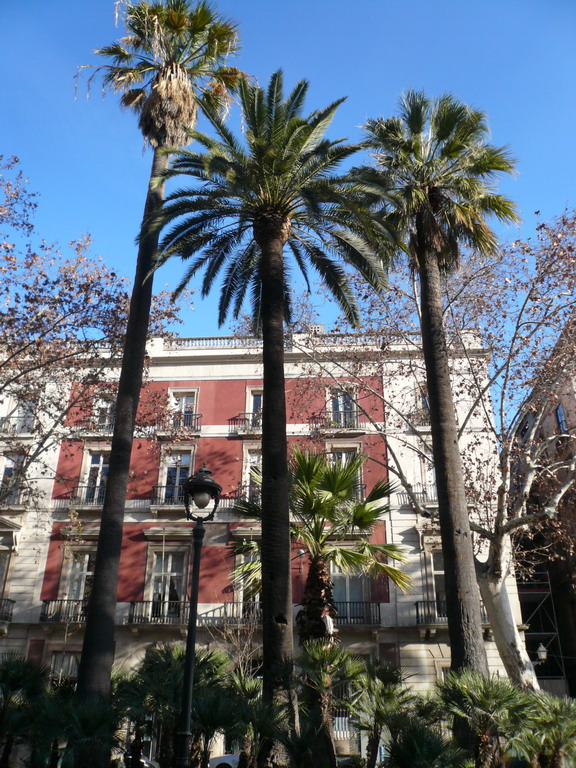
Palm trees (Washingtonia filifera and Phoenix dactylifera) in Plaça del Duc de Medinaceli

Plaça del Duc de Medinaceli is a square in central Barcelona. It is part of Barri Gòtic, in the Ciutat Vella district, located between Passeig de Colom and Carrer de la Mercè, on a terrain formerly part of a 13th-century Franciscan convent until 1836. The square was projected after the disappearance of the old city walls and the convent in the 19th century. It is named after the 16th century nobleman Luis de la Cerda y de la Vega, count of Medinaceli, Cogolludo and Arcos de Jalón, a descendant of the Montcada family, who gave away the terrain to the Franciscans.

== Names ==
It had previously been known as plaça de sant Francesc and plaça dels Framenors, and from the construction of the square as we see it now, Manuel Azaña, Duque de Medinaceli and Barcas.

== In popular culture ==
The square is famously featured in a scene of Pedro Almodóvar's film "Todo sobre mi madre".

== Transportation ==
- Barcelona Metro L3 station Drassanes.
