= Luis de la Cerda =

- Prince of Fortuna; Count of Clermont

Prince of Fortuna
- Reign: November 1344 – 5 July 1348
- Successor: Luis de la Cerda y Guzmán
- Born: Luis de la Cerda; France
- Died: 5 July 1348; Lamotte-du-Rhône
- Spouse: Leonor de Guzmán, Guiote D'Uzès
- Issue: Luis de la Cerda y Guzmán; Juan de la Cerda y Guzmán; Isabel de la Cerda
- House: House of la Cerda
- Father: Alfonso de la Cerda
- Mother: Matilde of Brienne-Eu

Luis de La Cerda, also called Louis of Spain (France, 1291 - Lamotte-du-Rhône, 5 July 1348) was an expatriate royal prince of the Crown of Castile, who lived and served in the Kingdom of France. Among his titles, Luis de la Cerda was the count of Talmont, count of Clermont and an admiral of France. He was also made the first 'Prince of Fortuna' (sovereign ruler of the Canary Islands) by Pope Clement VI in 1344, although he never actually set foot on the islands.

== Biography ==
=== The disinherited family ===
Luis de la Cerda was the second son of Alfonso de la Cerda, the disinherited and Matilde of Brienne-Eu (daughter of John II of Brienne). Alfonso had been chosen to inherit the Kingdom of León from his grandfather King Alfonso X of Castile-León, but was deposed and driven into exile in 1284 by his uncle, Sancho IV. As a result, most of Alfonso's children, including Luis de la Cerda, were born and raised in France mainly because his grandmother was Blanche of France, a daughter of King Louis IX of France.

=== Marriage ===
In 1306, Luis married Leonor de Guzman, daughter of Alonso Perez de Guzman "el Bueno", the defender of Tarifa, and Maria Alonso Coronel. Through his wife's inheritance he became, lord of Deza, Enciso and Puerto de Santa Maria. He lived for some time in Castile, where his presence is noted at the coronation of Alfonso XI who conferred on him the order of chivalry.

=== Siege of Gibraltar ===
Luis had his first military experience when he served Alfonso XI in the Fourth siege of Gibraltar in 1333 against the Moors.

=== In service of the French ===
Most historians argue that Luis returned to France to mainly improve his fortunes. As a cousin of the French King, he entered the French court.

King Philip VI of France invested Luis de la Cerda as Count of Clermont and the first Count of Talmont in 1338/39. The King set up these estates in an area of France immediately bordering the English possessions of the Guyenne in the south west and in the north east, and was particularly exposed.

==== Hundred Years War ====
===== First Theatre of War =====
Accounts show that in 1339 the French Army was garrisoned at his castle of Talmont, to defend Lille He was titled “Sovereign captain” at that stage.

In 1340, Luis received a testimony of royal confidence when he was called on March 13 to fill the post of admiral left vacant by Hue Quiéret, fatally wounded in a naval battle. During the truce that followed, Luis worked to rebuild the navy, with new ships being built and fitted out ships available in all ports of France, while also recruiting crews from maritime populations of the Basque provinces.

===== Second Theatre of War =====
During the Breton War of Succession, Luis joined the command of the Duke of Normandy in October 1341, travelled to Angers where a Franco-Breton army was massing, joining the likes of the Viscount de Rohan and lords of Avaugour, Olivier IV de Clisson and Beaumanoir.

During the siege of Nantes where the opposing forces were stationed, the starving civilians seized a convoy of food outside the walls and subsequently were attacked by Luis, pursued to the foot of the walls, where a furious melee ensued. Half of these people found themselves cornered on the ramparts, were killed or taken prisoner.

Luis resigned as admiral in March 1341, no record is known to exist for historians to understand the motives for this. What is known is by spring 1342 he had directly joined the Franco-Breton army of Charles de Blois as a commander.

During the siege of Hennebont, Luis was issued siege weapons by Charles after he had moved on to attack Auray; Luis accelerated operations as quickly as he could, and soon the defenders were open to surrender talks when an English fleet arrived. The besieged exited the town and destroyed one of the siege weapons. In a council with his principal lieutenants, Luis resolved to lift the siege and join the rest of Franco-Breton army attacking Auray.

Luis then moved on Dinan which had no defenses other than the Rance river and palisades. To make the river crossing, Luis ordered rafts be built, but these preparations were moot, for at the end of four days, the defenders killed their own captain and opened the gates.

Luis then crossed the width of Brittany to besiege the commercial town of Guérande. Luis used his Spanish and Genoese mercenaries to attack all sides at once. Without giving quarter to the inhabitants, they engaged in plunder, not even respecting the churches, five of which were desecrated and burned. When Charles heard of these excesses, he ordered Luis to hang 24 principal culprits. Luis still left Guérande, loaded with loot and proceeded to join Charles, still in front of the walls of Auray.

Luis with his mercenaries, then set sail for Quimper and Quimperlé to continue pillaging. As news of the devastation reached the Anglo-Bretons under de Mauny, he left Hennebont for Quimperlé where Luis's forces were still ashore. De Mauny damaged badly-guarded vessels before disembarking his own troops, dividing them into 3 groups and began to search for the looters. His vanguard was repulsed by Luis who, took to the field with one of his nephews, named Alphonse. The local peasantry also joined, and quickly routed Luis's force, killing his nephew.

Luis recuperated at Rennes and after six weeks, rejoined Charles de Blois in a second attempt at capturing Hennebont. The Anglo-Breton defenders, who, aware of his recent defeat, taunted him from the ramparts. According to the chroniclers Jean Le Bel and Froissart, this mocking angered Luis so much that he sought some form of retribution. These chroniclers, state that one day in the tent of Charles de Blois, and in front of other lords, begged him to grant him a grace in reward for his services. Charles did not attach much importance and agreed to this request. Luis apparently then asked to be given two captured Anglo-Breton knights, Jean le Bouteiller and Hubert de Frenay. Luis apparently then added that he wanted them beheaded in front of the city's ramparts. Charles was astonished, telling Luis that these prisoners were Christians, not Moors and that such an act would be dishonorable. Luis refused to change his resolve and threatened to quit the army if he did not obtain satisfaction. Charles gave in and the two knights, were sent for. Luis remained unmalleable to showing mercy and announced that the execution would take place the same day after dinner. The Anglo-Breton defenders apparently had spies in Charles camp and became aware of the situation, resolving to try everything to snatch them back. While Amaury de Clisson simulated a distraction to attract the attention of the besiegers, Mauny took a detour into the now empty camp and recaptured the two knights returning with them. The second siege of Hennebont then continued without any progress; being finally abandoned around the middle of October. Charles then attacked the small town of Jugon, while the rest of the army was garrisoned in Garhaix under the command of Luis.

Luis was finally involved in a naval battle fought in the vicinity of the Island of Guernsey in 1342 between an English fleet, bringing aid to the Anglo-Bretons and a Franco-Breton fleet, consisting mainly of Luis's mercenaries. The fight which started at the end of the afternoon was interrupted by twilight, only resuming again at dawn. A storm that arose during the night forced the adversaries to part ways, but not before the Franco-Bretons had captured four Anglo-Breton ships loaded with provisions and horses. This however did not stop the Anglo-Breton commander Robert III of Artois landing his troops in Brittany. The chroniclers relate that Luis was involved for the rest of the war in seizing English supply ships intended for the Anglo-Breton force besieging Vannes, and surprising an enemy fleet anchored not far from there, to seizing four ships loaded with supplies, three of which were sunk. Luis left the War of Breton Succession very rich as a result of the huge loot and plunder captured.

===== Third Theatre of War =====
During the War in the Guyenne, in 1346, Luis resumed service for Philippe de Valois. The chroniclers state that he participated in a campaign led by the Duke of Normandy against the English commanded by the Earl of Derby during the first half of that year. The season's campaign ended in failure in front of the stronghold of Aiguillon. According to Froissart, Luis later distinguished himself by finally braking through the walls of this fortress.

=== Prince of the Fortunate Islands ===
Although known since classical antiquity, there had been practically no European contact with the Canary islands (known then as the Fortunate Islands) until the early 14th century, when Genoese captain Lanceloto Malocello stumbled on the island of Lanzarote. European interest in the islands accelerated quickly following a 1341 mapping expedition sponsored by Afonso IV of Portugal, which supplied detailed descriptions of the 'Guanches', the primeval aboriginal inhabitants of the islands. The prospect of new and easy slave-raiding grounds whet the appetites of European merchants. Majorcan expeditions, organized by private commercial consortiums, set out immediately for the Canary islands, with the objective of capturing natives to sell them as slaves in European markets.

Luis de la Cerda, then serving as a French ambassador to the papal court in Avignon, submitted a proposal to Pope Clement VI that offered the Catholic Church the more palatable vision of conquering the islands and converting the native Guanches to Christianity.

On 15 November 1344, Pope Clement VI issued the bull Tuae devotionis sinceritas granting the Canary islands in perpetuity Luis de la Cerda and his heirs, granting him the sovereign title of "Prince of Fortuna", with attendant rights to mint coinage and other royal privileges. In return, Cerda promised to convert the natives and render the papacy an annual tribute of 400 gold florins, due yearly on the feast of Saints Peter and Paul (29 June). Eleven islands were cited in the bull by the ancient (and fantastical) names given by Pliny: Canaria, Ningaria, Plumaria, Capraria, Junonia, Embronea, Atlantica, Hesperida, Cernae, Gorgona and Galeta. Upon receiving the crown and sceptre from the hands of the pope, a cavalcade was sent around the streets of Avignon, announcing Luis de la Cerda as the newly created king of the islands. Luis de la Cerda quickly acquired the popular appellation of Infante de la Fortuna.

Pope Clement VI followed this up with another bull, Prouenit ex tue in January 1345, giving the Cerda conquest the character of a crusade, granting indulgences to any who participated. Papal letters were dispatched to the rulers of Portugal, Castile, Aragon, France, Sicily, Vienne and Genoa, demanding recognition of Cerda's title and urging them to provide material assistance to Cerda's upcoming expedition (projected within three years). The Portuguese king Afonso IV immediately lodged a protest, claiming priority of discovery, but conceded to the authority of the pope. Alfonso XI of Castile also protested, using the ancient Visigothic dioceses and prior reconquista treaties to claim the islands fell within Castilian jurisdiction and 'sphere of conquest', but nonetheless recognized Cerda's title.

Despite their formal recognitions, preparations were stalled by the opposition of the Iberian monarchs. With the assistance of the Archbishop of Neopatria, Luis de la Cerda managed to secure a commitment from Peter IV of Aragon to put some galleys at his disposal, but the others were far less forthcoming, if not outright hostile. The renewed outbreak of the Hundred Years War in 1346 put the project on hold, as Luis de la Cerda resumed military service for the French crown. As a result, no expedition was mounted before Cerda's untimely death on 5 July 1348.

Tradition holds that the Aragonese galleys prepared for Luis de La Cerda, either tired of the delays (or immediately after his death), decided to set out on their own for the Canaries and attempted a landing on La Gomera, but were quickly repulsed by the natives. As there is no documentary evidence for this expedition, some historians have been eager to identify it with a known ill-fated Aragonese expedition of 1360, but it is improbable that Cerda's galleys would have remained available that late.

=== Death and resting place ===
Luis de la Cerda was buried in the Abbey of Saint-Gilles in Languedoc, France. His titles of Talmont and Prince of Fortuna were inherited by his eldest living son Luis de la Cerda y Guzmán. But after the male lines died without issue, the titles passed through Luis de la Cerda's daughter Isabel de la Cerda Pérez de Guzmán into the house of the Counts (and later Dukes) of Medinacelli. Although it is reported that the papal-conferred title of Prince of Fortuna automatically expired after five years with no expedition, the De la Cerda-Medinacelli family continued to press their claim for the lordship of the islands.

== Descendants ==
In 1306, Luis de la Cerda married Leonor de Guzmán, daughter of Alonso Pérez de Guzmán and María Alfonso Coronel. Offspring from this marriage:

- Alfonso, Maria, Blanca, Fernando and a second Maria de la Cerda, all of whom died in childhood.
- Luis de la Cerda y Guzmán (c. 1325 - 1383), second titular Prince of Fortuna and second Count of Talmont.
- Juan de la Cerda y Guzmán (1327–1357), Lord of Puerto de Santa María and Gibraleón, briefly alguacil mayor of Seville (f. 1355).
- Isabel de la Cerda y Guzmán (c. 1329 - 1382), Lady of Puerto de Santa María, married 1. Rodrigo Pérez Ponce de León and 2. Bernal de Foix, 1st Count of Medinaceli.

After his first wife's death, Luis de la Cerda married Guiote D'Uzès, daughter of Robert I, Viscount of Uzès. There was no issue from this marriage.

Outside of marriage, Luis de la Cerda also had a bastard son Juan de España, born in France in 1347, and recognized in his father's will.

== Sources ==
- Monumenta Henricina, (1960–1967), Manuel Lopes de Almeida, Idalino Ferreira da Costa Brochado and Antonio Joaquim Dias Dinis, editors, Coimbra. vol. 1 (1143–1411)
- Fernández-Armesto, F. (2007) Before Columbus: exploration and colonisation from the Mediterranean to the Atlantic 1229-1492. Philadelphia: University of Pennsylvania Press.
- Meliá, Juan Tous (2000) Guía histórica del Museo Militar Regional de Canarias Tenerife. online
- Jiménez de la Romera, W. (1868). Crónica de las Islas Canarias (PDF). Madrid: Rubio, Grily y Vitturi.
- Viera y Clavijo, José de (1772). Noticias de la Historia General de las Islas Canarias. Madrid: Blas Román. 4 volumes. Vol. 1
