= Luis de la Cerda, 1st Marquis of Cogolludo =

Spanish nobleman

Luis de la Cerda, 1st Marquis of Cogolludo (in full, Spanish: Don Luis de la Cerda y Portugal, primer marqués de Cogolludo) (c. 1506–1536) was a Spanish nobleman.

He was the eldest son of Don Juan de la Cerda, 2nd Duke of Medinaceli, by his first wife Mencía Manuel de Portugal. He married Ana de Mendoza, Lady of the Nueve Lugares de la Cuadrilla de Sierra-Alta del Ducado de Medinaceli, without issue.

== Sources ==
- Hobbs, Nicolas (2007). "Grandes de España" (in Spanish).
- Instituto de Salazar y Castro. Elenco de Grandezas y Titulos Nobiliarios Españoles (in Spanish). periodic publication.

Spanish nobility
New title	Marquis of Cogolludo; 1535–1536	Succeeded by Gastón de la Cerda
