= Church of Santa María =

Church of Santa María may refer to:

- Church of Santa María (Arcos de la Frontera), Spain
- Church of Santa María (Ateca), Spain
- Church of Santa Maria (Busturia), Spain
- Church of Santa María (Cogolludo), Spain
- Church of Santa María (Fuenmayor), Spain
- Church of Santa María (Lebeña), Spain
- Church of Santa María (Salvatierra), Spain
