= Gastón de la Cerda, 3rd Duke of Medinaceli =

Spanish nobleman

Gastón de la Cerda, 3rd Duke of Medinaceli, Grandee of Spain, (in full, Spanish: Don Gastón de la Cerda y Portugal, tercer duque de Medinaceli, segundo marqués de Cogolludo, segundo conde del Puerto de Santa María, Grande de España, señor de las villas de Deza, Enciso, Imón y Barahona, antes monje de la Orden de San Jerónimo, después caballero y comendador de la Orden de San Juan de Jerusalén, con honores de Gran Prior en la misma), (c. 1507 – 1552) was a Spanish nobleman.

He was the second son of Don Juan de la Cerda, 2nd Duke of Medinaceli, by his first wife Mencía Manuel de Portugal. As a young man he became a monk in the Order of St. Jerome. In 1536, after the death of his elder brother Luis without issue, he became the heir to the family titles, so he sought a Papal dispensation in order to marry and fulfill his family obligations. On 4 March 1540 he married María Sarmiento de la Cerda, a marriage that was eventually annulled on 30 August 1544, having produced no issue.

== Sources ==
- Hobbs, Nicolas (2007). "Grandes de España" (in Spanish).
- Instituto de Salazar y Castro. Elenco de Grandezas y Titulos Nobiliarios Españoles (in Spanish). periodic publication.

Spanish nobility
Preceded by Juan de la Cerda	Duke of Medinaceli; 1544–1552	Succeeded by Juan de la Cerda
Preceded by Luis de la Cerda	Marquis of Cogolludo; 1536–1552	Succeeded by Juan de la Cerda
