= Banū Sālim =

The Banū Sālim was a Masmuda Berber lineage prominent in the Middle March of Al-Andalus between the 8th and 10th centuries. They are generally regarded as clients of the Umayyads, acting as tax collectors (amilun) and sometimes as military governors (qā'idūn). They are often identified with the Banū al-Faray with whom they shared a common nasab. They controlled an area in the eastern part of the Middle March that included places such as Medinaceli, Madrid, Atienza, Alcalá, and Guadalajara (which was their main stronghold). They lost territorial power when they were routed from Guadalajara in 920 under Emir Abd al-Rahman III of Córdoba.

== Bibliography ==
- Bueno, Marisa (2011). "La importancia de los linajes bereberes en la contrucción social de la marca media. Los Banu Salim como ejemplo". Revista del Instituto Egipcio de Estudios Islámicos (39): 167–190. ISSN 1132-3485.
- Bueno Sánchez, Marisa (2012). "¿Frontera en el Duero oriental? Construcción y mutación de funciones en el Taġr Banū Sālim (siglos VIII-XI)»" (PDF). In Martos Quesada, Juan; Bueno Sánchez, Marisa (eds.). Fronteras en discusión. La Península Ibérica en el siglo XII (2012). Madrid: A.C. Almudayna. ISBN 978-84-87090-76-9.
- Fierro, Maribel (2009). "Abd al-Rahman III frente al califato fatimí y el Reino astur-leonés: campañas militares y procesos de legitimación político-religiosa" (PDF). Rudesindus: San Rosendo. Su tiempo y su legado. ISBN 978-84-453-4592-4.
