= Antonio de la Cerda, 7th Duke of Medinaceli =

Spanish nobleman

Antonio de la Cerda, 7th Duke of Medinaceli, Grandee of Spain, (in full, Spanish: Don Antonio Juan de la Cerda y Toledo, séptimo duque de Medinaceli, sexto marqués de Cogolludo, segundo marqués de la Laguna de Camero Viejo, sexto conde del Puerto de Santa María, Grande de España, señor de las villas de Deza y Enciso, Virrey. Lugarteniente de SM y capitán general del Reino de Valencia (1641), capitán general de Mar Océano y de las Costas y Ejércitos de Andalucía, comendador de Moraleja, caballero de la Orden de Álcantara, gentilhombre de cámara de Felipe IV y Carlos II y de sus Consejo de Estado y Guerra), (25 October 1607 – 7 March 1671) was a Spanish nobleman.

He was the son of Don Juan de la Cerda, 6th Duke of Medinaceli, by second wife Doña Antonia de Toledo y Dávila. On 28 November 1625, in Dos Hermanas, province of Sevilla, at the age of 17 he married the 13-year-old Ana Portocarrero, 5th Duchess of Alcalá, with whom he had four children. In 1641, he was appointed viceroy of Valencia, position he held for one year. He died in Madrid.

== Sources ==
- Hobbs, Nicolas (2007). "Grandes de España" (in Spanish). Archived from the original on 25 October 2008.
- Instituto de Salazar y Castro. Elenco de Grandezas y Titulos Nobiliarios Españoles (in Spanish). periodic publication.

Government offices
Preceded by The Prince of Butera	Viceroy of Valencia; 1641–1642	Succeeded by The Duke of Gandia
Spanish nobility
Preceded by Juan de la Cerda	Duke of Medinaceli; 1607–1671	Succeeded by Juan de la Cerda
Preceded by Sancho de la Cerda	Marquis of Laguna de Camero Viejo; 1626–1671	Succeeded by Tomás de la Cerda
