= Prince of Fortuna =

Arms of Luis de la Cerda, the first Prince of Fortuna.

Prince of Fortuna was a royal title created for Luis de la Cerda in November 1344 by Pope Pope Clement VI. Fortuna is the ancient name for the Canary Islands.
