= Sancho de la Cerda, 1st Marquis of la Laguna =

Spanish nobleman and diplomat

Sancho de la Cerda, 1st Marquis of la Laguna, (in full, Spanish: Don Sancho de la Cerda y Portugal, primer marqués de la Laguna de Camero Viejo, caballero de la orden de Álcantara, comendador de la Moraleja y Ceclavín, embajador extraordinario en Flandes para dar el pésame del archiduque Alberto y a la infanta archiduquesa Isabel Clara Eugenia, Gentilhombre de Cámara de S.M., del Consejo de Estado y Guerra de Felipe III, Mayordomo Mayor de la Reina Margarita), (c. 1550 – 14 November 1626) was a Spanish nobleman and diplomat.

Sancho was the third son of Don Juan de la Cerda, 4th Duke of Medinaceli and of his wife Doña Joana Manuel de Portugal. He joined the royal household, and rose to become Spanish Ambassador to Flanders, member of the council of state and of the council of war under King Philip III and later head of the household of his wife, Queen Margaret of Austria. He was rewarded with the title of Marquis of la Laguna de Camero Viejo on 16 February 1599.

== Descendants ==
On 14 March 1578, in Madrid, Sancho de la Cerda married Inés de Zúñiga, Lady of Villoria, Parraces, Huélamo, Toya and Silamos, daughter of Don Diego de Zúñiga, Marquis of Huelamo with whom he had no issue. After the death of his wife, he married for a second time, with María de Villena y de Mello, Lady-in-waiting to Queen Margaret of Austria, with whom he had one daughter.

By María de Villena:

- Juana de la Cerda, who married Alfonso de Alvarado, 2nd Count of Villamor

== Sources ==
- Hobbs, Nicolas (2007). "Grandes de España" (in Spanish).
- Instituto de Salazar y Castro. Elenco de Grandezas y Titulos Nobiliarios Españoles (in Spanish). periodic publication.

Spanish nobility
New title	Marquis of Laguna de Camero Viejo; 1599–1626	Succeeded by Antonio de la Cerda
