= Luis de la Cerda y de la Vega =

Spanish aristocrat

Luis de la Cerda y de la Vega, 5th Count of Medinaceli (c. 1442 – Écija, 25 November 1501) was a Spanish aristocrat who was created 1st Duke of Medinaceli in 1479. He was also a patron of Christopher Columbus.

== Biography ==
He was born into the family of a wealthy Andalusian landowner, Gaston de la Cerda y Sarmiento, 4th Count of Medinaceli (1414-1454), and Leonora de la Vega y Mendoza, Señora of Cogolludo and daughter of Íñigo López de Mendoza, 1st Marquis of Santillana. He was therefore a member of the powerful House of Mendoza.

=== 1st Duke of Medinaceli ===
On 10 June 1454, after the death of his father, Luis de la Cerda inherited the title of 5th Count of Medinaceli. In 1479, Queen Isabella the Catholic of Castile granted him the title of 1st Duke of Medinaceli. He took part in the wars against Portugal and the Emirate of Granada.

=== Personal life ===
The Duke of Medinaceli spent his life away from the royal court, on his estates. In the capital of his domains, Cogolludo, he built the Palace of the Dukes of Medinaceli, one of the first Renaissance palazzos in Spain. While residing in his new palace, he appointed the nobleman Diego López de Medrano (†1482) of the powerful House of Medrano in Soria as alcaide (governor) of his former residence, the Castle of Medinaceli.

=== Patron of Christopher Columbus ===
He was in regular correspondence with his uncle, Cardinal Mendoza, and with Queen Isabella of Castile. In one of his letters to Mendoza, he writes:

Sir, I do not know if Your Eminence knows that I kept in my house for a long time Cristóbal Colomo, who had arrived from Portugal and was going to France with the intention of finding funds and patrons to search for the Indies… He lived in my house for two years.

The Duke of Medinaceli became interested in the project of Columbus, who lived in poverty at the time, and provided him with financial support. Since his own fleet was not sufficient for a large-scale expedition, the Duke brought the navigator together with Cardinal Mendoza and Queen Isabella, thus making his contribution to the discovery of America.

Luis de la Cerda was also one of the first persons that Columbus contacted when he had returned from his first voyage to the Americas.

=== Marriage and children ===
In 1460, Count Medinaceli entered into his first marriage with Catalina Lasso de Mendoza, Señora Valfermoso de Tajuña. The marriage was childless and was dissolved on 14 December 1472.

==== Anna de Navarra ====
In 1471, Luis de la Cerda married Anna de Navarra (1451-1477), the only (albeit illegitimate) daughter of the late Charles, Prince of Viana. Upon entering into marriage, Count Medinaceli renounced all rights to inherit Navarre, claimed by the Prince of Viana. From his second marriage was born:

- Leonor de la Cerda of Aragon and Navarre (1472-1497), who married in 1493 Rodrigo Díaz de Vivar y Mendoza, 1st Marquis of Cenete, no issue.

==== Catalina de Orejón ====
Since 1485 he lived with his mistress Catalina de Orejón from El Puerto de Santa María. From their relationship he had one son:

- Juan de la Cerda Vique de Orejón (1485-1544)

A few months before his death, the Duke of Medinaceli married his mistress Catalina de Orejón, which allowed him to legitimize his only son, who had already become an adult, and transfer to him the titles and possessions of the de la Cerda family.

Spanish nobility
Preceded by New creation	Duke of Medinaceli; 1479–1501	Succeeded by Juan de la Cerda Vique de Orejón
