= Luis Francisco de la Cerda, 9th Duke of Medinaceli =

Spanish noble and politician

The Most Excellent The Duke of Medinaceli GE
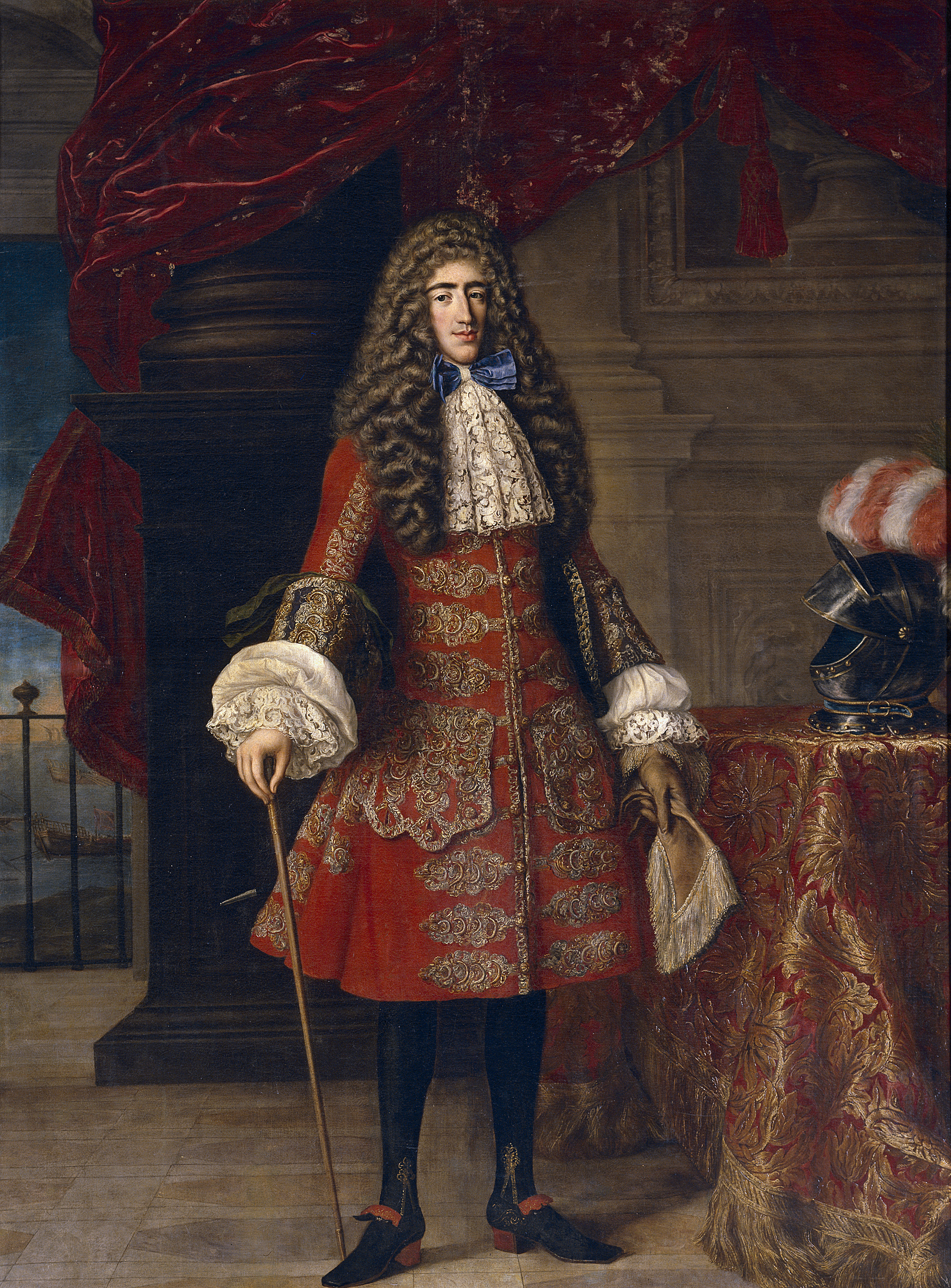
- Don Luis by Jacob Ferdinand Voet
- Born: 2 August 1660
- Died: 26 January 1711 (aged 50)
- Title: 9th Duke of Medinaceli
- Parent(s): Don Juan Francisco de la Cerda and Doña Catalina de Aragón Folc de Cardona y Córdoba

Luis Francisco de la Cerda y Aragón, 9th Duke of Medinaceli (2 August 1660, in El Puerto de Santa María – 26 January 1711, in Pamplona), 9th Duke of Medinaceli, was a Spanish noble and politician.

== Biography ==
Eldest son of Valido Don Juan Francisco de la Cerda and Doña Catalina de Aragón Folc de Cardona y Córdoba, he inherited the titles of his father: Duke of Medinaceli, Duke of Alcalá de los Gazules, Marquis of Cogolludo, Marquis of Tarifa and Marquis of Alcalá de la Alameda, and from his mother Duke of Segorbe, Duke of Cardona, Duke of Lerma, Count of Empúries, Marquis of Denia, Marquis of Comares, Marquis of Pallars, and twice Grandee of Spain, making him one of the most important Spanish aristocrats of his time.

During the reign of King Charles II of Spain he served in Italy, being ambassador to the Holy See of Pope Innocent XII, and Viceroy and Captain General of Naples. From 1699 he was a member of the Spanish Council of State.

When Charles II died, he was appointed prime minister at the beginning of the War of Spanish Succession by the new King Philip V of Spain. More and more opposed to the strong French influence at the Spanish Court, he leaked in 1710 a secret French plan to the English about efforts to conclude a separate peace with the Dutch Republic. For this, he was incarcerated in the Alcázar of Segovia and later transferred to the castle of Pamplona, where he died the next year.

He married María de las Nieves Girón y Sandoval, daughter of Gaspar Téllez-Girón, 5th Duke de Osuna, who survived him. There being no surviving children from the marriage, his titles went to his nephew Nicolás Fernández de Córdoba, son of his sister Feliche María de la Cerda y Aragón.

== Art collection ==
His collection included paintings now in the collection of the Prado:

- The Wine of Saint Martin's Day by Breugel
- Las Hilanderas by Velázquez

Government offices
Preceded by Francisco de Benavides	Viceroy of Naples; 1695–1702	Succeeded by Juan Manuel Fernández Pacheco, 8th Marquis of Villena
Spanish nobility
Preceded by Juan Francisco de la Cerda	Duke of Medinaceli; 1691–1711	Succeeded by Nicolás Fernández de Córdoba
