= Juan Francisco de la Cerda, 8th Duke of Medinaceli =

Spanish noble and politician

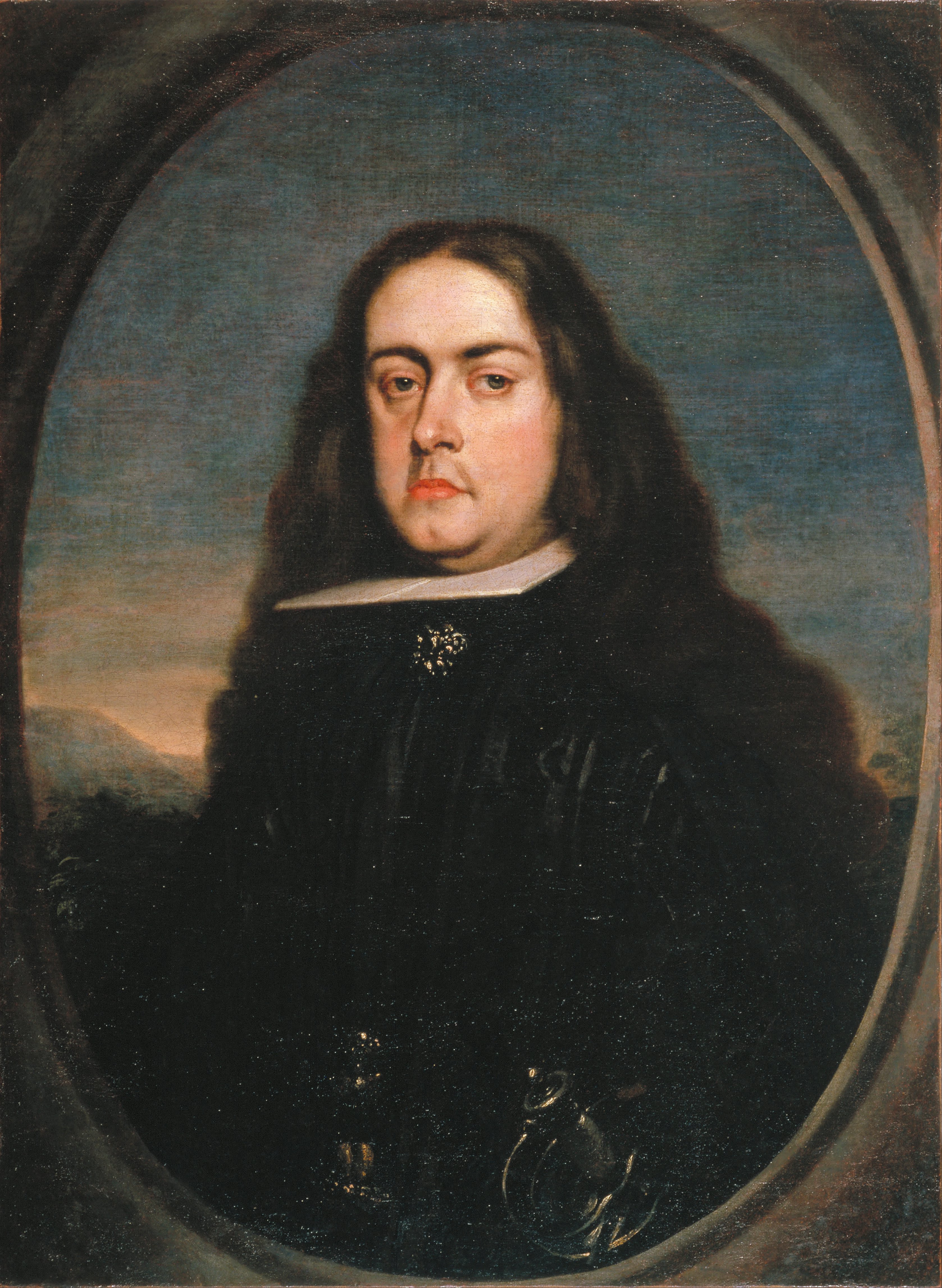
Portrait of Juan Francisco de la Cerda Enríquez de Ribera, 8th Duke of Medinaceli by Claudio Coello (Museu Nacional d'Art de Catalunya).

Juan Francisco de la Cerda Enríquez de Ribera (Medinaceli, 4 November 1637 – Madrid, 20 February 1691), 8th Duke of Medinaceli, 7th Marquis de Cogolludo, 4th Marquis of Alcalá de la Alameda, 6th Duke of Alcalá de los Gazules, 9th Count of Los Molares, 9th Marquis of Tarifa, 8th Count of El Puerto de Santa María, was a Spanish noble and politician, and chief minister of King Charles II of Spain.

During his tenure as chief minister of Spain (1680-1685), de la Cerda enforced a number of economic reforms aimed at reducing the galloping inflation, avoiding the permanent deficit, and filling the coffers of Spanish Monarchy. De la Cerda's policies achieved one of the largest deflations in history, which proved very beneficial to the King's subjects, increasing their incomes and purchasing powers. However, his measures failed to fill the royal coffers, led to food riots, and eventually caused his downfall in 1685. Most of his policies were nevertheless continued and expanded by his successor as chief minister, the Count of Oropesa, and are credited with fostering the economic recovery of Spain.

== Biography ==
Don Juan Francisco was the son of Antonio de la Cerda, 7th Duke of Medinaceli and Ana María Luisa Enríquez de Ribera Portocarrero y Cárdenas, 5th Duchess of Alcalá de los Gazules.
By his marriage to Catalina de Aragón, Don Juan Francisco added the titles of Duke of Segorbe, Cardona and Lerma to the House of Medinaceli.

In 1677, John of Austria the Younger, the illegitimate half-brother of King Charles II (who was young and inexperienced) had removed the Queen Mother Mariana from court, and established himself as prime minister. Great hopes were entertained for his administration, but it proved disappointing and short: Don John died on 17 September 1679.

As his predecessors, Don Juan Francisco was a loyal servant of the Spanish Crown, and after the death of John of Austria, he became the Valido of King Charles II.
Also Sumiller de Corps and Caballerizo mayor to the King, he drastically reformed the economy through the Junta de Comercio y Moneda, but his monetary devaluation led to collapse of the prices and speculation on grain, which led to several bankruptcies.

In several regions of Spain, food riots broke out, which led together with the humiliating Truce of Ratisbon with France, to the resignation of Don Juan Francisco. He retired from politics and died in 1691. All his titles went to his son Luis Francisco de la Cerda.

Spanish nobility
Preceded by Antonio de la Cerda	Duke of Medinaceli; 1671–1691	Succeeded by Luis Francisco de la Cerda
