= Juan de la Cerda, 5th Duke of Medinaceli =

Spanish nobleman

Juan de la Cerda, 5th Duke of Medinaceli (1544 – 29 May 1594), Grandee of Spain, (in full, Spanish: Don Juan Luis de la Cerda y Manuel de Portugal, quinto duque de Medinaceli, cuarto marqués de Cogolludo, cuarto conde del Puerto de Santa María, Grande de España, señor de las villas de Deza y Enciso, embajador extraordinario en Portugal, caballero de la Orden del Toisón de Oro, Order of the Golden Fleece, since 1585), was a Spanish nobleman and Ambassador in Portugal.

He was the son of Don Juan de la Cerda, 4th Duke of Medinaceli and of Joana Manuel, daughter of Sancho de Noronha, 2nd Count of Faro. In 1565 he married Donna Isabella d’Aragona, daughter of Don Antonio d'Aragona, 2nd Duke of Montalto with whom he had two children. In 1580, he married for a second time, with Juana de la Lama, 4th Marchioness of la Adrada, a widow since 1571 of Don Gabriel de la Cueva, 5th Duke of Alburquerque, deceased as a Governor of the Duchy of Milan, Italy, with whom he had two more children.

== Sources ==
- Hobbs, Nicolas (2007). "Grandes de España" (in Spanish).
- Instituto de Salazar y Castro. Elenco de Grandezas y Titulos Nobiliarios Españoles (in Spanish). periodic publication.

Spanish nobility
Preceded by Juan de la Cerda	Duke of Medinaceli; 1575–1594	Succeeded by Juan de la Cerda
