= Juan de la Cerda, 6th Duke of Medinaceli =

Spanish nobleman

Juan Luis de la Cerda, 6th Duke of Medinaceli, Grandee of Spain, (in full, Spanish: Don Juan Luis Francisco de la Cerda y Aragón, sexto duque de Medinaceli, quinto marqués de Cogolludo, quinto conde del Puerto de Santa María, Grande de España, señor de las villas de Deza y Enciso, caballero de la Orden del Toisón de Oro), (20 May 1569 – 24 November 1607) was a Spanish nobleman and Ambassador in Germanic countries.

He was born in Cogolludo, province of Guadalajara, the son of Don Juan de la Cerda, 5th Duke of Medinaceli, by first wife Donna Isabella d’Aragona, daughter of Don Antonio d'Aragona, 2nd Duke of Montalto. In 1580 he married Ana de la Cueva, daughter of Don Gabriel de la Cueva, 5th Duke of Alburquerque with whom he had one daughter. On 21 August 1606, he married for a second time, with Antonia de Toledo y Dávila, daughter of Don Gómez Dávila, 2nd Marquis of Velada and tutor of King Philip III of Spain, with whom he had one son. He died shortly afterwards.

== Sources ==
- Hobbs, Nicolas (2007). "Grandes de España" (in Spanish).
- Instituto de Salazar y Castro. Elenco de Grandezas y Titulos Nobiliarios Españoles (in Spanish). periodic publication.

Spanish nobility
| Preceded by Juan de la Cerda | Duke of Medinaceli; 1594–1607 | Succeeded by Antonio de la Cerda |
