= Juan de la Cerda y Silva, 4th Duke of Medinaceli =

Spanish nobleman

Juan de la Cerda y Silva, 4th Duke of Medinaceli (c. 1514 – 1575), Grandee of Spain, was a Spanish nobleman.

He was the son of Don Juan de la Cerda, 2nd Duke of Medinaceli, by second wife María de Silva. In 1552 Juan de la Cerda inherited the titles from his older half-brother Gastón de la Cerda y Portugal.

Both half-brothers, the 3rd, Gaston, and the 4th Duke, Juan II, are widely reported in many places and articles as being born "out of marriage" from different women and being "legitimated" males by the Crown as legal successors to their father, the second Duke Juan I, also, apparently, a legitimated bastard.

In 1557, King Philip II of Spain appointed him Viceroy of Sicily, a position he held until 1564. During that time he besieged with a fleet the North African harbor of Tripoli, now in Libya, dealing with Dragut, an Ottoman privateer and admiral. The force, including ships from Spain, Genoa, Tuscany, the Knights of Malta and the Papal States, was however nearly destroyed in the Battle of Djerba.

In 1567 he was appointed Viceroy of Navarre, supposedly staying there till 1572, but it seems that towards the end of 1570, he became head of the household of Queen Anna of Austria, a position he held until his death in 1575.

In the spring of 1572 Philip II sent Medinaceli to the Netherlands as governor. According to Henry Kamen, Medinaceli reported to the king that "Excessive rigour, the misconduct of some officers and soldiers, and the Tenth Penny, are the cause of all the ills, and not heresy or rebellion." [...] One of the governor's officers reported that in the Netherlands "the name of the house of Alba" was held in abhorrence. Medinaceli lobbied the King for the removal of the Duke of Alba as military commander. Deciding that the views of Medinaceli and Alba were not compatible, Philip II removed both and replaced them with Requesens.

== Descendants ==
On 7 April 1541, at Ocaña, Juan de la Cerda married Joana Manuel, daughter of Sancho de Noronha, 2nd Count of Faro, with whom he had seven children.

By Joana Manuel de Portugal:

- María de la Cerda (c. 1542 – c. 1575), who married Antonio d'Aragona, 4th Duke of Montalto
- Juan de la Cerda, 5th Duke of Medinaceli, (1544 - duke 1575–1594).
- Gastón de la Cerda y Silva (c. 1546 – c. 1562) who was captured and died as a prisoner in Constantinople
- Sancho de la Cerda y Portugal, 1st Marquis of la Laguna de Camero Viejo (c. 1550 – 1626)
- Angela de la Cerda, who married Pier Giulio de Luna, 2nd Duke of Bivona
- Blanca de la Cerda, 1st Marchioness of Rifes, who married Fernando de Silva, 6th Count of Cifuentes
- Catalina de la Cerda, who married Francisco Gómez de Sandoval, 1st Duke of Lerma; their granddaughter Luisa de Guzman became Queen of Portugal (ancestor of all subsequent monarchs of Portugal), and their great-granddaughter was Catherine of Braganza, an English queen consort.

== Sources ==
- Hobbs, Nicolas (2007). "Grandes de España" (in Spanish).
- Instituto de Salazar y Castro. Elenco de Grandezas y Titulos Nobiliarios Españoles (in Spanish). periodic publication.

Government offices
Preceded by Juan de Vega	Viceroy of Sicily; 1557–1564	Succeeded by The Marquis of Villafranca
Preceded by José de Guevara, Lord of Escalante	Viceroy of Navarre; 1567–1572	Succeeded by Vespasiano Gonzaga, Prince of Sabbioneta
Preceded by	Governor of the Netherlands; 1573–1574	Succeeded by
Spanish nobility
Preceded by Gastón de la Cerda	Duke of Medinaceli; 1552–1575	Succeeded by Juan de la Cerda
