= Juan de la Cerda y Bique de Orejón, 2nd Duke of Medinaceli =

Spanish nobleman

Juan de la Cerda, 2nd Duke of Medinaceli, Grandee of Spain, (in full, Spanish: Don Juan de la Cerda y Bique de Orejón, segundo duque de Medinaceli, segundo conde del Puerto de Santa María, señor de las villas de Cogolludo, Deza, Enciso, Luzón y Cigüela y de la Tierra de los Alabastros), (1485 – 20 January 1544) was a Spanish nobleman.

He was the son of Don Luis de la Cerda, 1st Duke of Medinaceli by his third wife Catalina Bique de Orejón. Since his parents only married In Articulo Mortis in 1501, he was considered a bastard for the first half of his life but was legitimated by the Catholic Monarchs as the eldest surviving male issue from the first Duke. He took part in the battles for the incorporation of the Kingdom of Navarre into the unified Kingdom of Spain on behalf of King Ferdinand II of Aragon. He also was a courtier under Queen Isabella I of Castile till 1504, of her daughter Queen Joanna of Castile The Mad, and later supported her son King Charles I from 1516. He was rewarded with a grandeeship in 1520.

== Descendants ==
Juan de la Cerda married Mencía Manuel de Portugal, daughter of Afonso de Braganza, 1st Count of Faro, with whom he had three children. In 1512, he married for a second time, with María de Silva (1494 – 16 August 1544), daughter of Don Juan de Silva, 3rd Count of Cifuentes, with whom he had four more children.

By Mencía Manuel de Portugal:

- Isabel Mencía Manuel de la Cerda (d. 1550), who married Pedro Zapata de Ayala.
- Luis de la Cerda y Portugal (c. 1506–1536), 1st Marquis of Cogolludo, no issue.
- Gastón de la Cerda y Portugal (c. 1507 – 1552), 3rd Duke of Medinaceli, no issue.

By María de Silva:

- Juan de la Cerda y Silva (c. 1514 – 1575), 4th Duke of Medinaceli, had issue.
- Fernando de la Cerda y Silva (1516–1579), who married Ana de Thieulloye
- Catalina de la Cerda, who married Lorenzo Suárez de Mendoza, 5th Count of Coruña, Viceroy of New Spain
- Luisa de la Cerda (died 1596), who married Arias Pardo de Saavedra

Illegitimate:

- Francisco de la Cerda (d. 1544)
- Diego de la Cerda

== Titles ==
- 2nd Duke of Medinaceli
- 2nd Count of Puerto de Santa María

== Sources ==
- Hobbs, Nicolas (2007). "Grandes de España" (in Spanish).
- Instituto de Salazar y Castro. Elenco de Grandezas y Titulos Nobiliarios Españoles (in Spanish). periodic publication.

Spanish nobility
Preceded by Luis de la Cerda	Duke of Medinaceli; 1501–1544	Succeeded by Gastón de la Cerda
