= Church of Santa María (Cogolludo) =

- Iglesia de Santa María (Spanish)
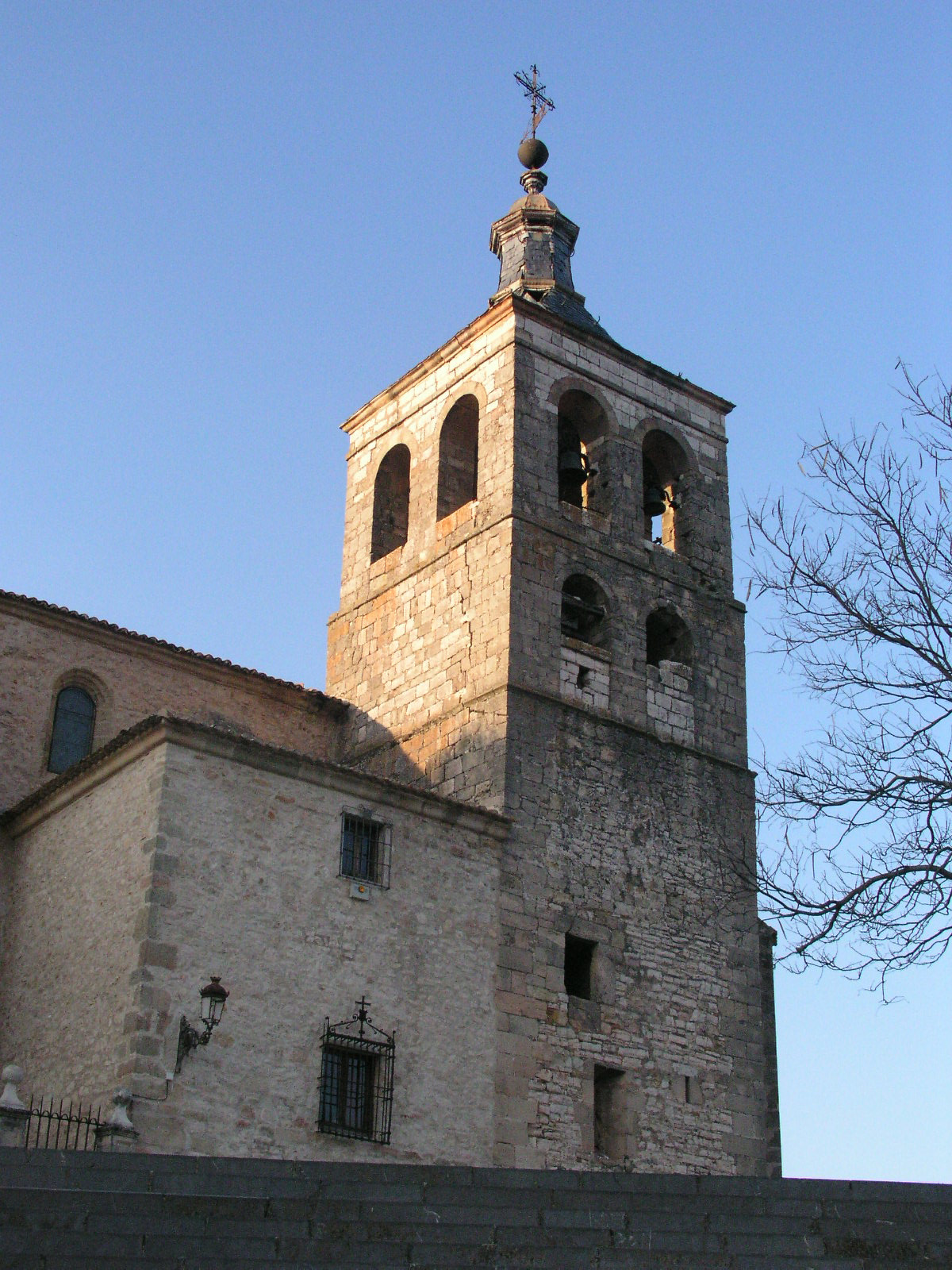

- Location within Spain
- 40.950278°N 3.0875°W
- Location: Cogolludo, Spain

Spanish Cultural Heritage
- Official name: Iglesia de Santa María
- Type: Non-movable
- Criteria: Monument
- Designated: 1996
- Reference no.: RI-51-0009106

The Church of Santa María (Spanish: Iglesia de Santa María) is a church located in Cogolludo, Spain. The church was constructed from 1545 to 1609.

It was declared Bien de Interés Cultural in 1996.
