= Isabel de la Cerda =

14th century Spanish noblewoman

Isabel de la Cerda also known as Isabel de la Cerda Pérez de Guzmán (Seville c.1329 - after 1383) was the only surviving daughter of Luis de la Cerda and his first wife Leonor de Guzmán; she was Lady of Puerto de Santa María and titular Princess of Fortuna. She was a member of the House de la Cerda.

== Life ==
Isabel was born in Seville around 1329, she was the youngest of three surviving children; her elder brothers were Luis and Juan de la Cerda y Guzmán, she had five other siblings who died in childhood. Her paternal grandfather was Alfonso de la Cerda, heir to the throne of Castile but disinherited in favor of his uncle, Sancho IV of Castile.

She first married in 1346 to Rodrigo Pérez Ponce de León; "Ruy Pérez Ponce de León" confirmed receipt of the dowry of "doña Isabel de la Cerda" by charter dated 11 March 1349. The couple were married up until before 26 May 1354, when Rodrigo died; they had no children.

A charter dated 30 December 1353 records the agreement between Isabel and her two brothers over their father's estate, who had died in 1348.

Isabelle remained unmarried for fourteen years, on September 15, 1370, in Bordeaux, she married Bernal de Foix, Count of Foix. At the age of forty, Isabelle gave birth to her son, Gaston III de Foix, an extremely late age for a first-time mother in the 14th century.

Eight years later, Bernal died, and Isabelle became the lady of the Château de Foix and its lands. She remained known for her extravagant and arrogant character. She raised the taxes on her subjects and turned her own son Gaston into her personal servant, renaming him Garçon, a name used for French peasants working in the fields, extremely lowly for the son of a count.

In a letter to the French King Charles V, Isabelle wrote that after becoming a widow at the age of twenty-four, it had not been her destiny to marry and have children, and that she had been forced by the late Bernal to do so and to have a son.

When Garçon turned seventeen, Isabelle refused to give him the rights to his father’s lands. The young count rose up against his mother, which ended with Garçon and Isabelle de la Cerda’s enraged subjects storming the Château de Foix. In order not to be captured by the crowd, the countess chose to take her own life and threw herself into the castle moat, where she died instantly on July 17, 1389, at the age of fifty-seven.

Gaston inherited his mother’s possessions and reclaimed his birth name. He later took part in the Hundred Years’ War.

Isabel and Bernal had two children:

- Gaston (c 1371–1404), succeeded his father as Count of Medinaceli
- Maria (died 1381), died in childhood

Isabel died after 1383 and was buried at the Monastery of Santa María de Huerta. Bernal died in 1391 and was succeeded by their son, Gaston. The county of Medinaceli was later turned into a Duchy by Isabella I of Castile.
