= Bernal de Foix, 1st Count of Medinaceli =

14th-century Spanish military officer

Bernal de Foix, 1st Count of Medinaceli (Spanish: Mosén Bernardo de Bearne y Foix, primer conde de Medinaceli; d. 1381), also known as "the Bastard of Bearn", was a military officer in the Crown of Castile, a region that is now part of Spain.

== Life and career ==
Bernal de Foix was an illegitimate son of Gaston III de Foix, the 11th Count of Foix. He was invested as the first Count of Medinaceli in 1368, and he married Doña Isabel de la Cerda in 1370. Isabel, the widow of Ruy Pérez Ponce de León, was the granddaughter of Alfonso de la Cerda, a grandson of King Alfonso X of Castile. She was granted large estates on the condition that she relinquish all claims to the Crown of Castile for herself and her heirs.

He took the side of royal bastard Henry of Trastámara against Henry's legitimate half-brother, King Peter of Castile, during the Castilian Civil War. He commanded a troop of Castilians under Henry. He chose to stay in Castile when Henry killed King Peter at the Castle of Montiel in March 1369.

The Count of Medinaceli donated property to his wife on 15 October 1370. The family later had extensive estates in the Spanish provinces of Soria and Guadalajara.

== Issue ==
He and his wife had two children:

- Gastón (1371–1404), succeeded his father as 2nd Count of Medinaceli
- María (d. 1381), died in childhood

Spanish nobility
New title	Count of Medinaceli; 1368–1381	Succeeded by Gastón de Béarn
