= Cogolludo =

Cogolludo, Spain
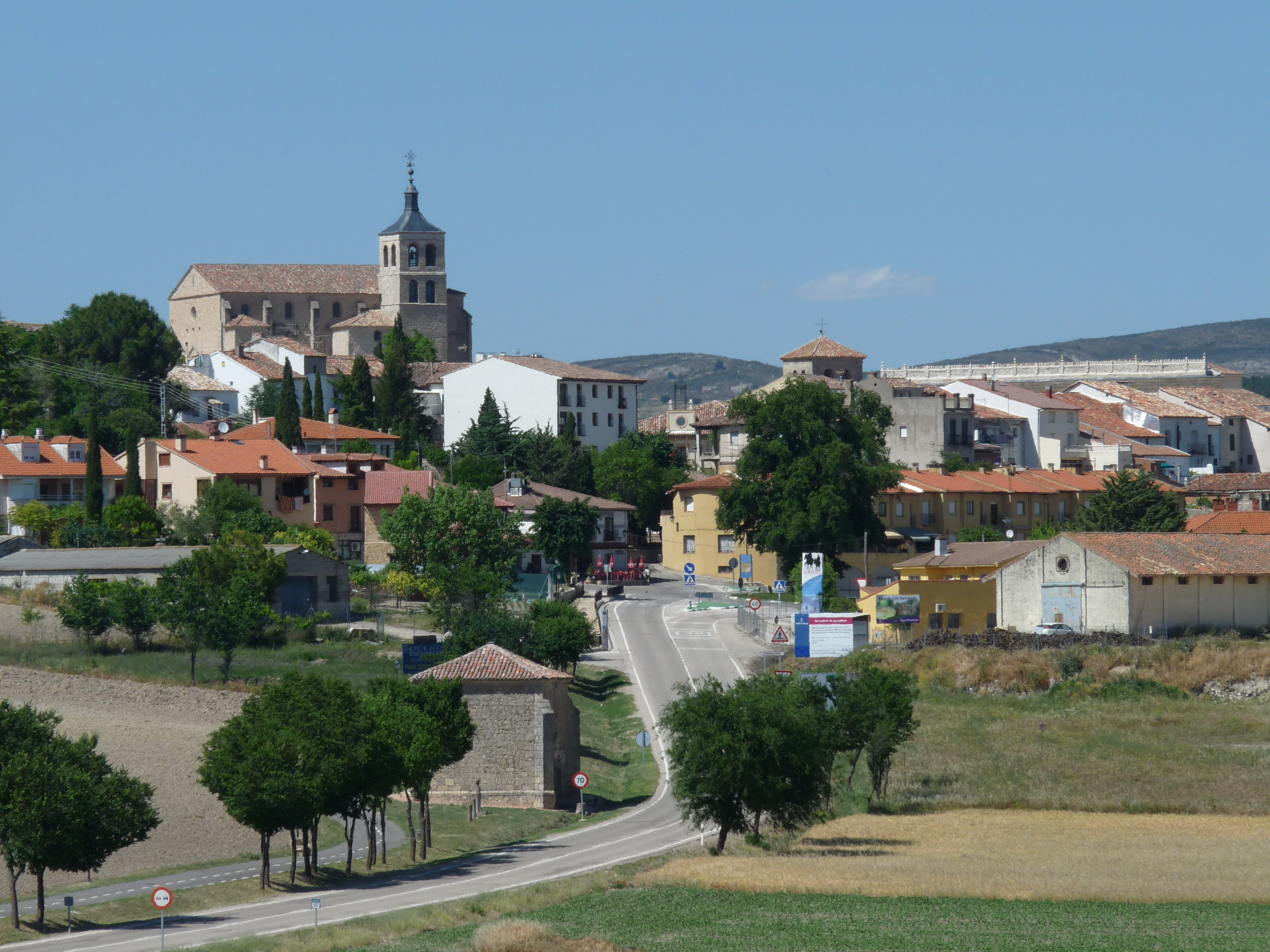
- General view of Cogolludo

- Flag Coat of arms

- Location in Spain Cogolludo, Spain (Castilla-La Mancha) Cogolludo, Spain (Province of Guadalajara)
- Coordinates: 40°56′54″N 3°05′15″W
- Country: Spain
- Autonomous community: Castile-La Mancha
- Province: Guadalajara
- Municipality: Cogolludo

Area
  - Total: 96 km^{2} (37 sq mi)

Population (2025-01-01)
  - Total: 574
  - Density: 6.0/km^{2} (15/sq mi)
- Time zone: UTC+1 (CET)
  - Summer (DST): UTC+2 (CEST)

Cogolludo is a municipality located in the province of Guadalajara, Castile-La Mancha, Spain. It forms part of the comarca of La Serranía and was the manorial home of the Dukes of Medinaceli. In 2015, it had a population of 600 inhabitants. The historic Church of Santa María stands in the town.

== Name and symbols ==
Its original name was Cugullent, from the Latin cucullus, which means "cap." This alludes to its location on a hill and to the crowding of its houses that mimics the appearance of a pineapple or bud. "Bud" would come to mean, according to other authors, "mound with a steep slope."

The municipal coat of arms - approved by decree on December 20, 1985 - is the following:

Cut: 1st and 4th part, made of gules, golden tower masoned with sable and clarified with gules; silver match the rampant lion of gules; 2nd and 3rd, of azure, three golden lyses, 2-1. At the top, royal crown closed.
 -Official Gazette of Castilla-La Mancha No. 52 of December 31, 1985

The municipal flag is a cloth of 2:3 proportions of crimson red color with the municipal coat of arms in the center.

== Notable people ==
- Luis de la Cerda y de la Vega, 1st Duke of Medinaceli
- Tomás de la Cerda, 3rd Marquis of la Laguna, Grandee of Spain
