= Medinaceli =

- Municipality
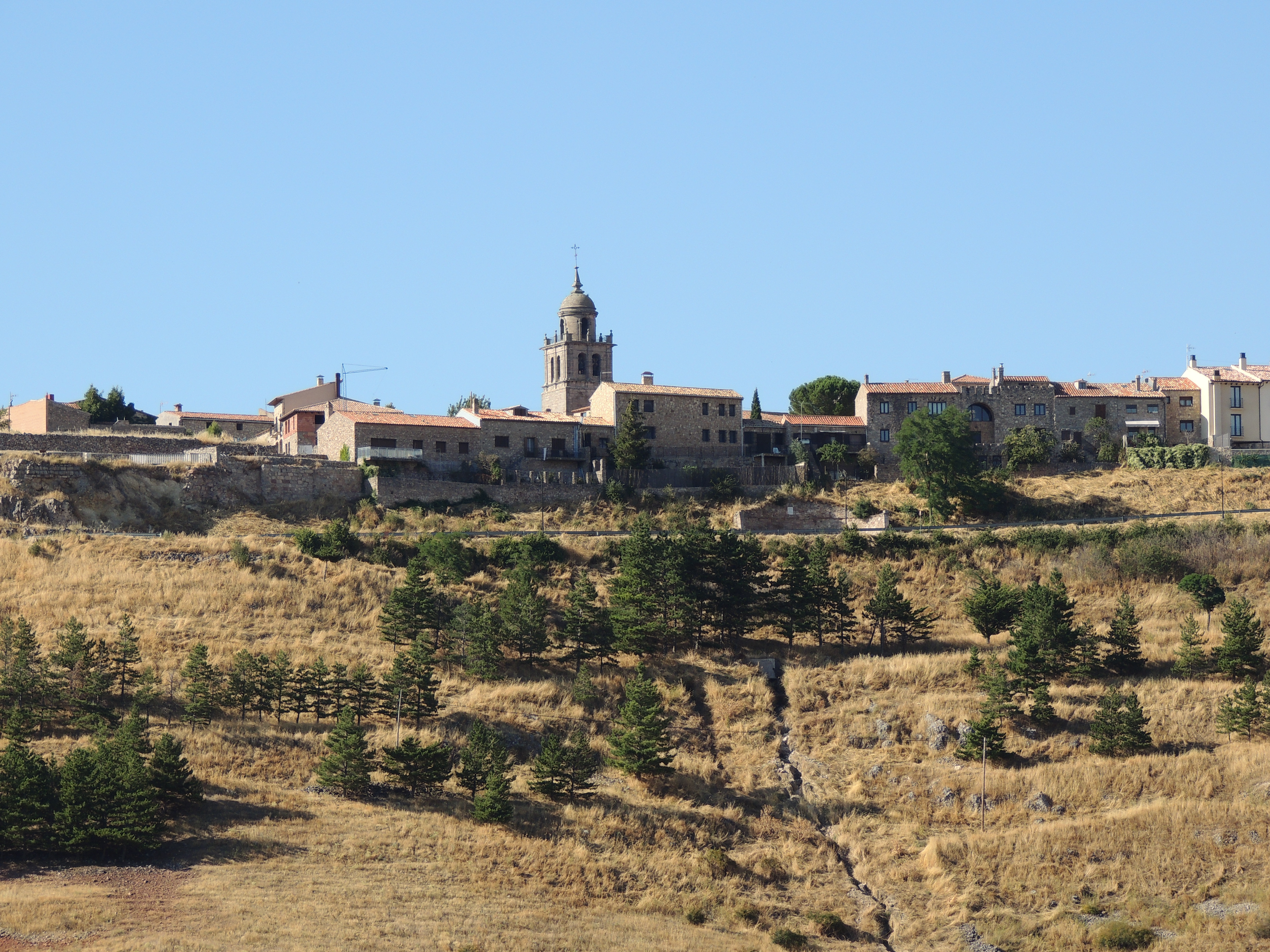
- View of Medinaceli

- Flag Coat of arms

- Municipality of Medinaceli

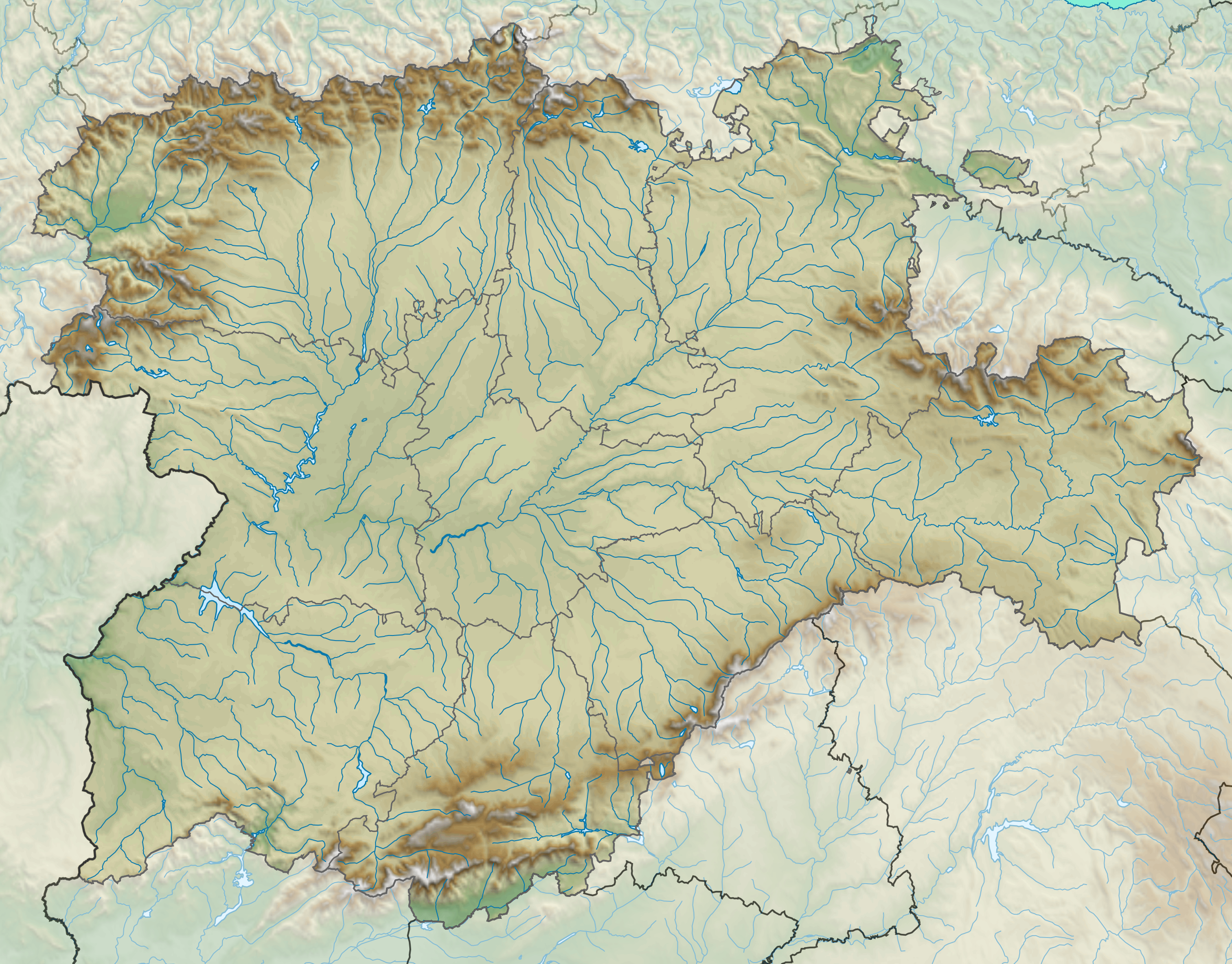
- Location within Castile and León Location within Spain
- Coordinates: 41°10′18″N 2°26′5″W
- Country: Spain
- Autonomous community: Castile and León
- Province: Soria

Government
  - Mayor: Felipe Utrilla Dupre (PP)

Area
  - Total: 205.37 km^{2} (79.29 sq mi)
- Elevation: 1,092 m (3,583 ft)

Population (2025-01-01)
  - Total: 686
  - Density: 3.34/km^{2} (8.65/sq mi)
- Demonym: Ocelitanos
- Time zone: UTC+1 (CET)
  - Summer (DST): UTC+2 (CEST)
- Website: Official website

Medinaceli (pronounced [meðinaˈθeli]) is a municipality and town in the province of Soria, in Castile and León, Spain. Built on a hilltop at about 1210 metres above sea level, the town oversees the Jalón valley. The municipality includes other villages like Torralba del Moral. The A-15 and A-2 motorways link up in the municipality.

== Etymology ==
Its name derives from the Arabic مدينة سليم madīnat salīm, which comes from the Masmuda berber lineage of the Banū Sālim.

== History ==
Situated at the confluence of the rivers Jalón and Arbujuelo, Medinaceli was the site of the Celtiberian town known as Occilis or Okilis.

During the Islamic period it enjoyed the status of madina (city). In this period, the Berber Banū Sālim, a lineage of the Masmuda tribal group, installed in the area. Even after the Banū Sālim fell from grace and were routed in 920, Medinaceli retained its strategic importance for Cordobese authorities, serving as a powerbase for military operations in the north, including the campaign against Christian settlements in the upper Duero and the curbing of the Banu Tujib revolt. Medinaceli became the head of the Middle March in 946.

== Main sights ==
Built between the 1st and 3rd centuries CE, Medinaceli is home to the only three-gated Roman arch in Spain. The arch is used as Spain Historic site symbol throughout the country.

The castle of Medinaceli served as the residence of the Dukes of Medinaceli until the Ducal Palace (Palacio Ducal) was used for this purpose.

Other buildings include the Colegiata de Nuestra Señora de la Asunción, whose abbots fought with the bishops of Sigüenza to maintain the city's rights. The Convent of Saint Elizabeth (16th century) (Convento de Santa Isabel), which lies next to the church of San Martín, also stands in good condition. The beaterio (house inhabited by lay sisters) of San Román (Saint Romanus) is in ruins; it may have previously been a synagogue.

Moorish-era remains include a stone gate, one of the few remains of the ancient city walls.

The town is also listed as a Camping Aire, suitable for motorhomes, in Vicarious Media "All the Aires in Spain". The aire is on a plateau next to a small water tower and affords magnificent panoramic views. The town is a very short walk from the aire.

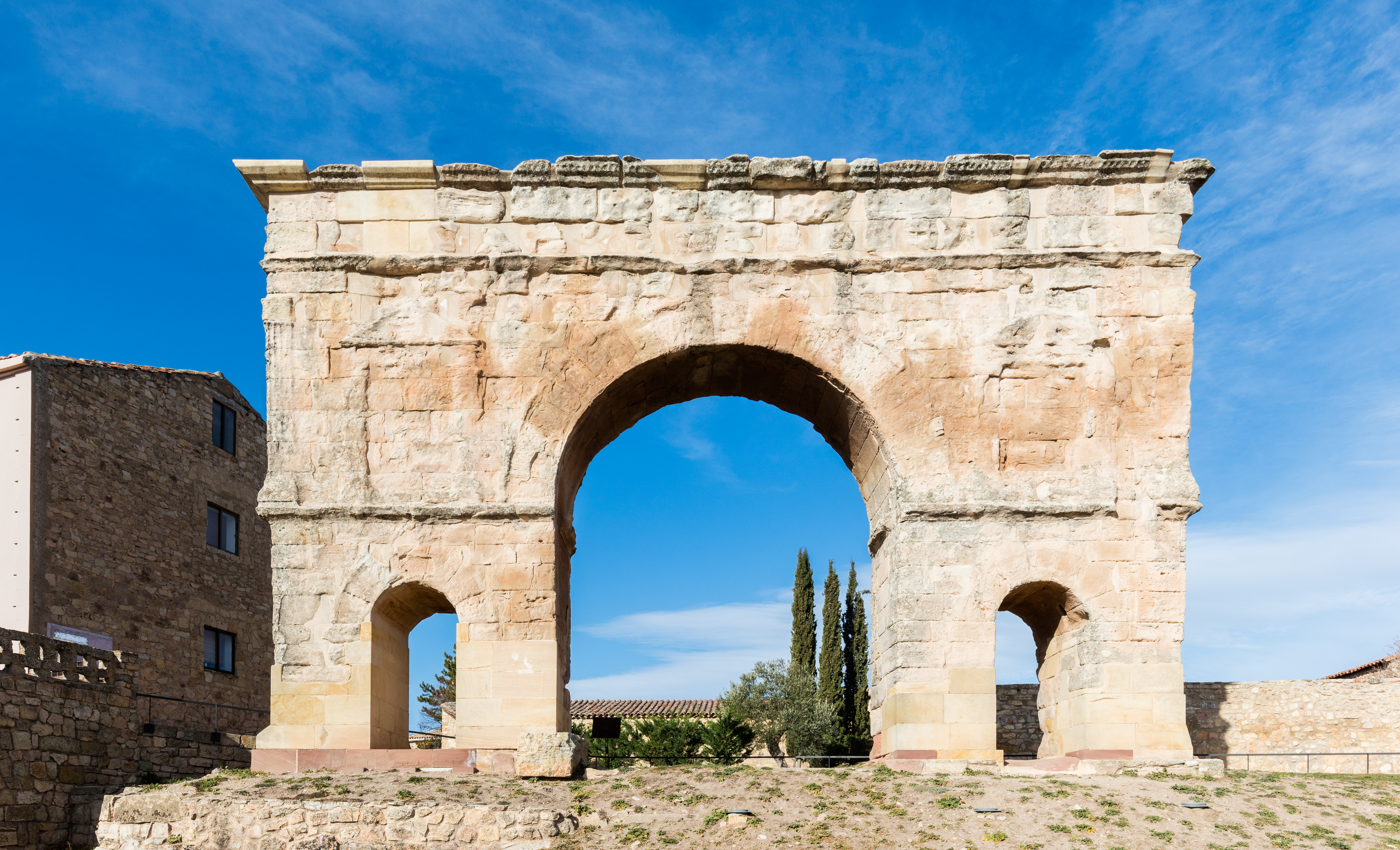
Roman arch (1st century AD)

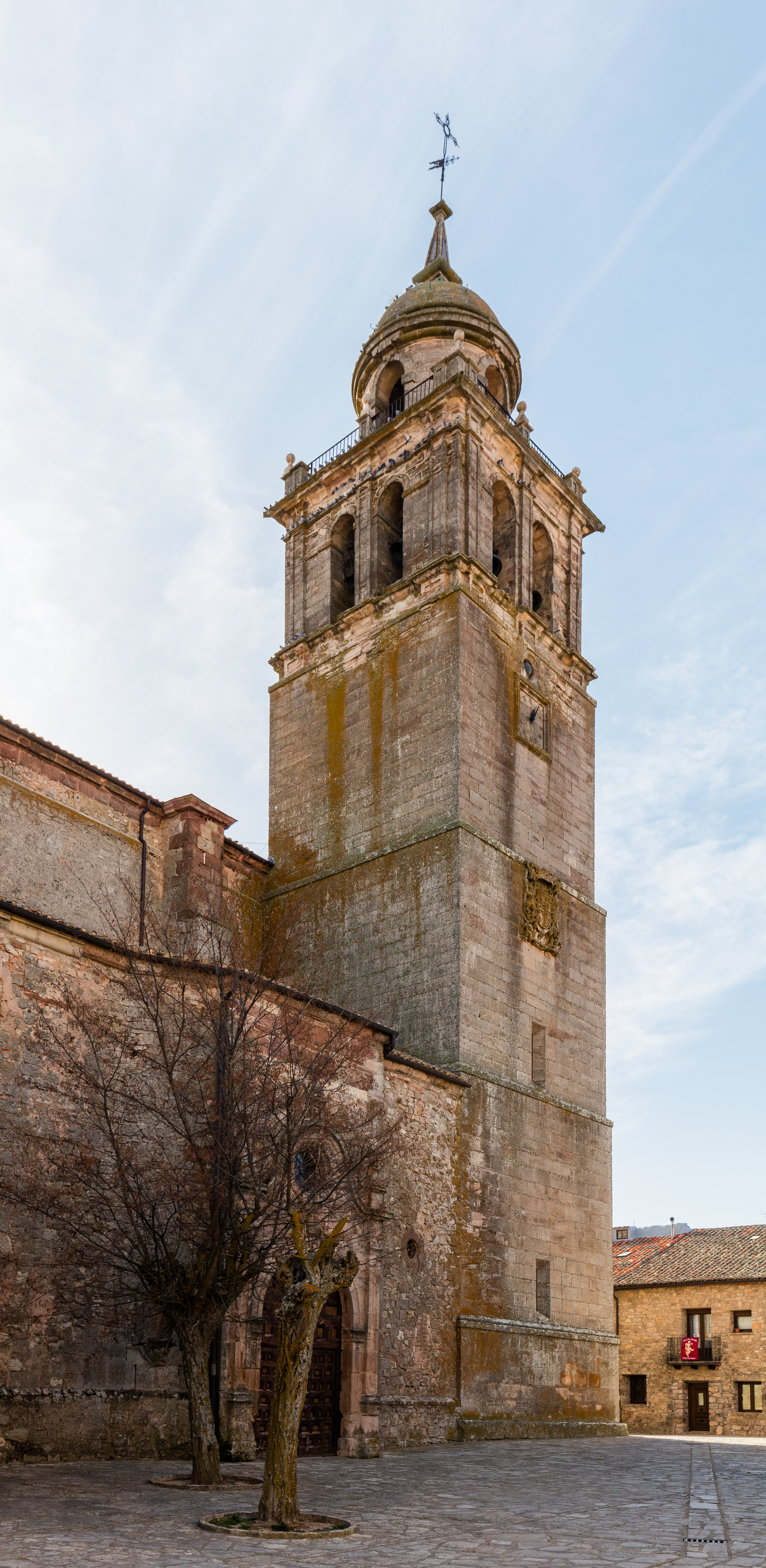
Colegiata

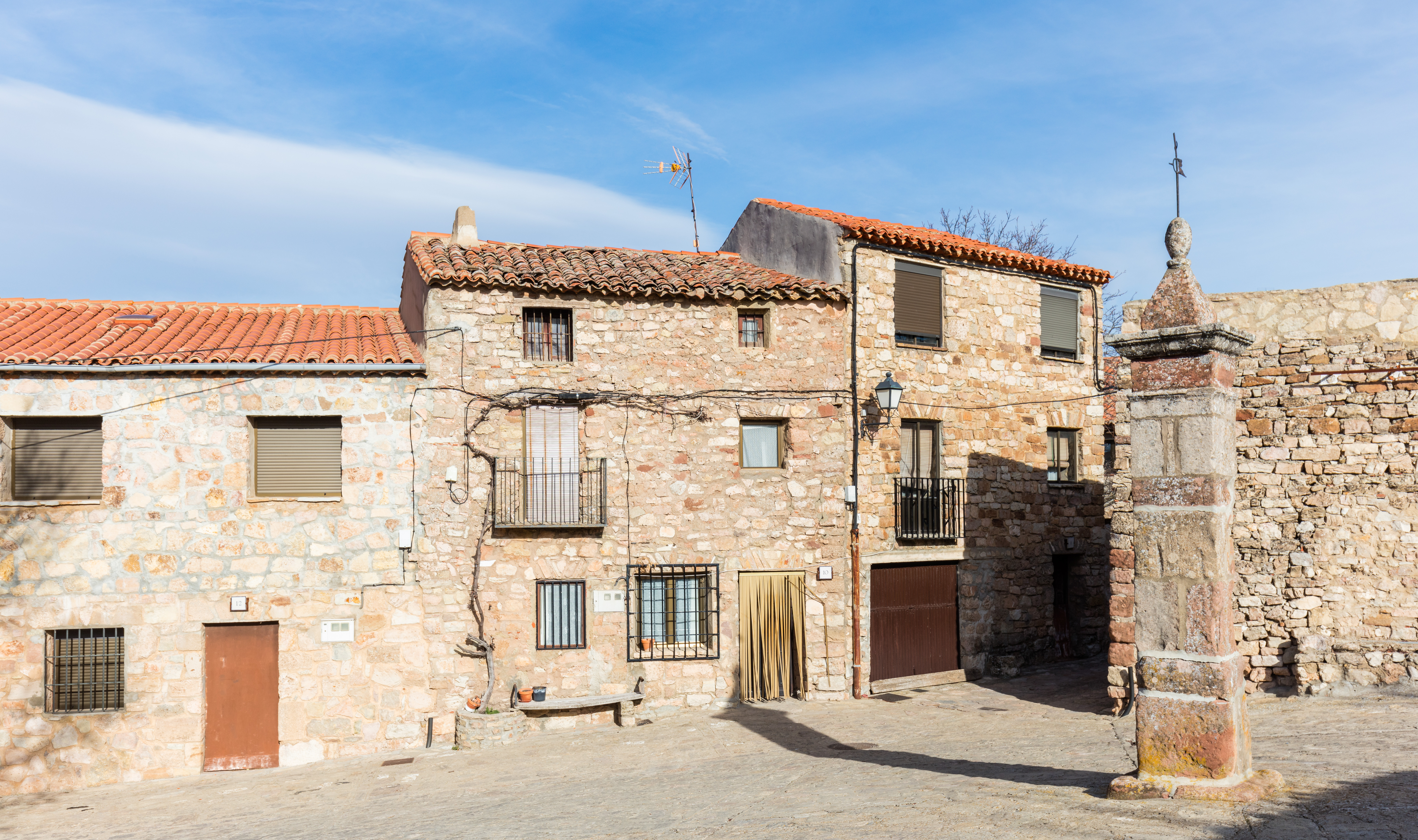
Cross in a square

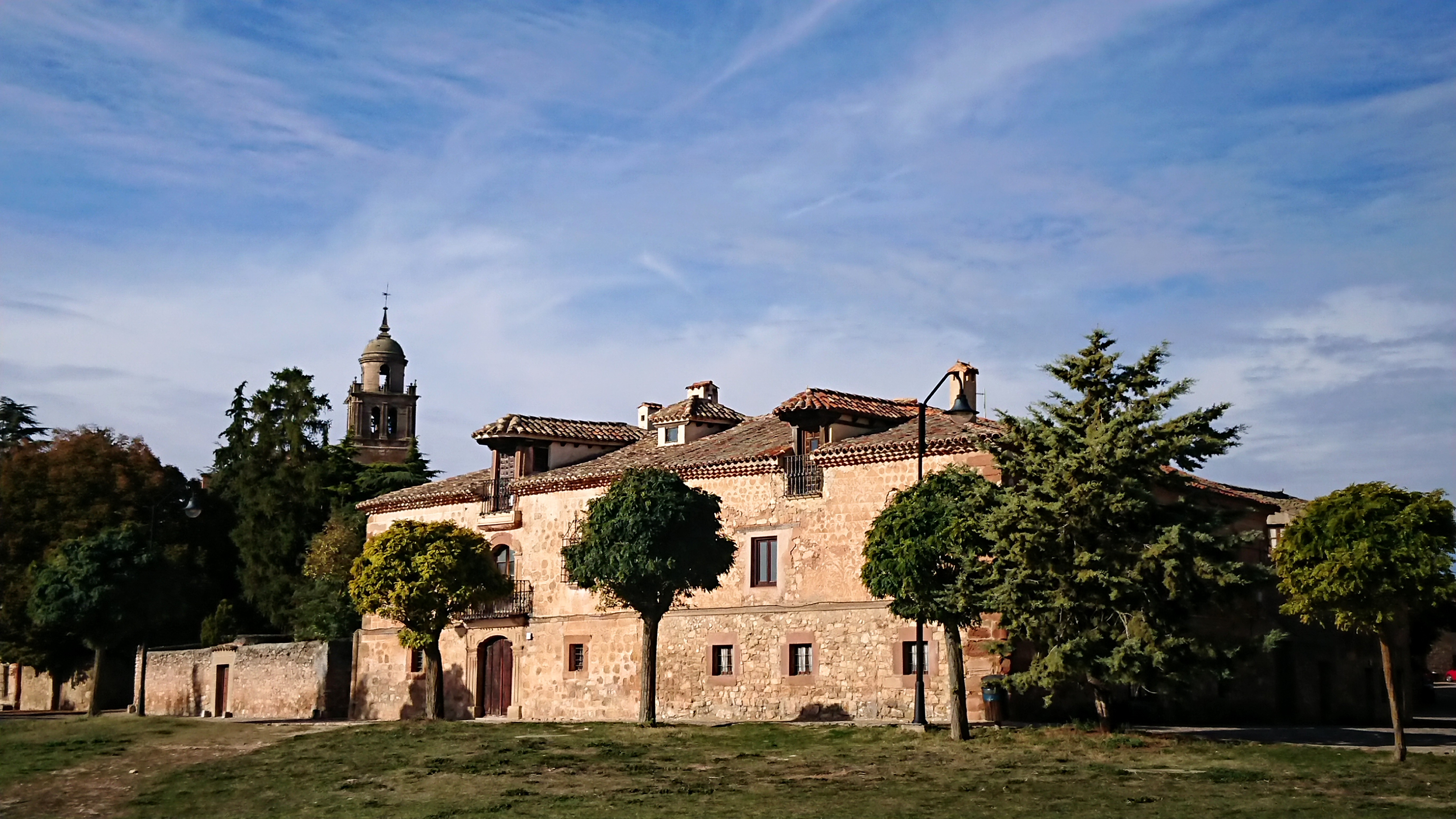
Convent of Santa Isabel

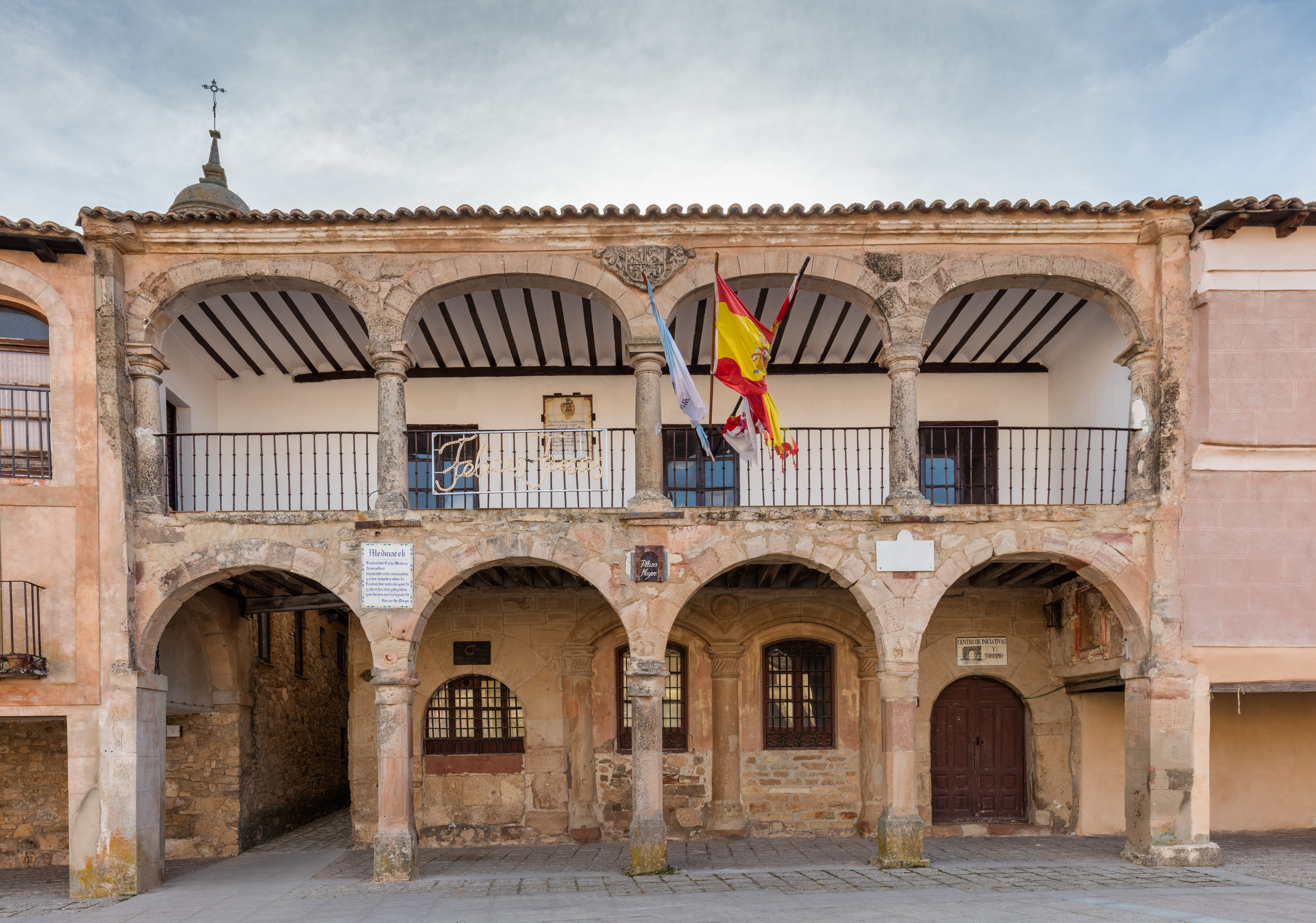
Old town hall (today tourism office)

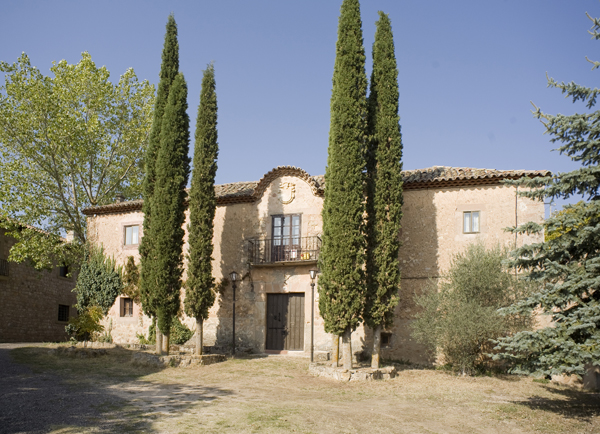
Beaterio de San Ramón

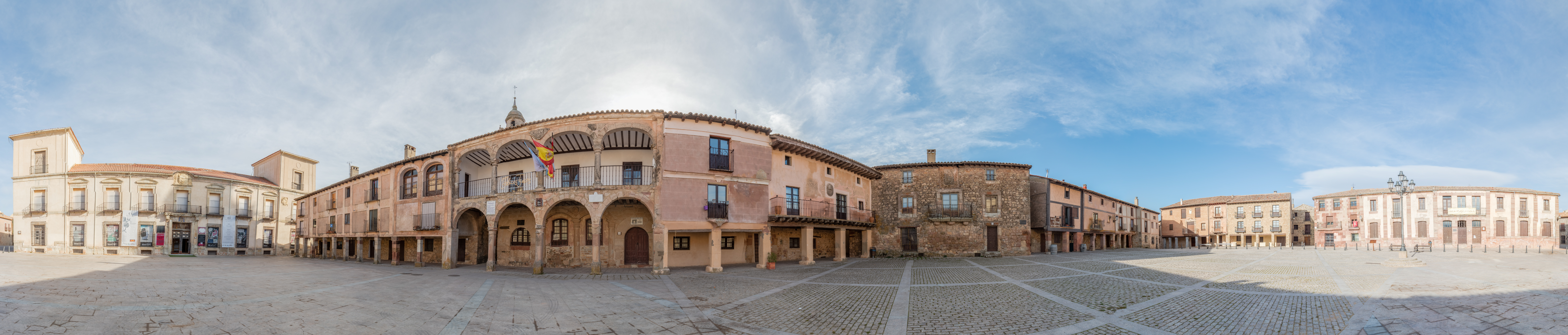
360° view of Plaza Mayor (Main square)

== "Fire Bull" festival ==
The "Toro Jubilo" or "Toro de Fuego" is a festival that takes place in Medinaceli. The festival is a symbolic ritual celebrating a victory against the Carthaginians in the city of Elche. During this festival, a bull is tied to a post. Balls of tar are then placed on each horn of the bull and lit. The bull is then released in the square, which has five lit bonfires symbolizing five martyrs.

Animal rights group PACMA has described the fiesta as "a clear example of animal mistreatment" and PETA has called it "a sadistic festival". This is because the fire balls burn for hours, causing a great amount of agony to the animal.

== Bibliography ==
- Bueno Sánchez, Marisa (2015). "Madinat Salim, de la madina a la villa. Transformación del tejido urbano en un área de frontera" (PDF). In Ríos Saloma, Martín F. (ed.). El mundo de los conquistadores. UNAM. pp. 159–196. ISBN 978-607-02-7530-2.
