= Duke of Medinaceli =

Spanish nobility title

Dukedom of Medinaceli
- Creation date: 1479
- Created by: Ferdinand II and Isabella I
- Peerage: Peerage of Spain
- First holder: Luis de la Cerda y de la Vega, 5th Count of Medinaceli
- Present holder: Princess Victoria of Hohenlohe-Langenburg, 20th Duchess of Medinaceli

Duke of Medinaceli (pronounced [meðinaˈθeli]) is a hereditary title in the peerage of Spain, accompanied by the dignity of Grandee. The Catholic Monarchs, Ferdinand II of Aragon and Isabella I of Castile, created the title and awarded it on 31 October 1479 to Luis de la Cerda y de la Vega. He also held the title of 5th Count of Medinaceli, which was first awarded in 1368 to his ancestor, Bernal de Foix.

== History ==
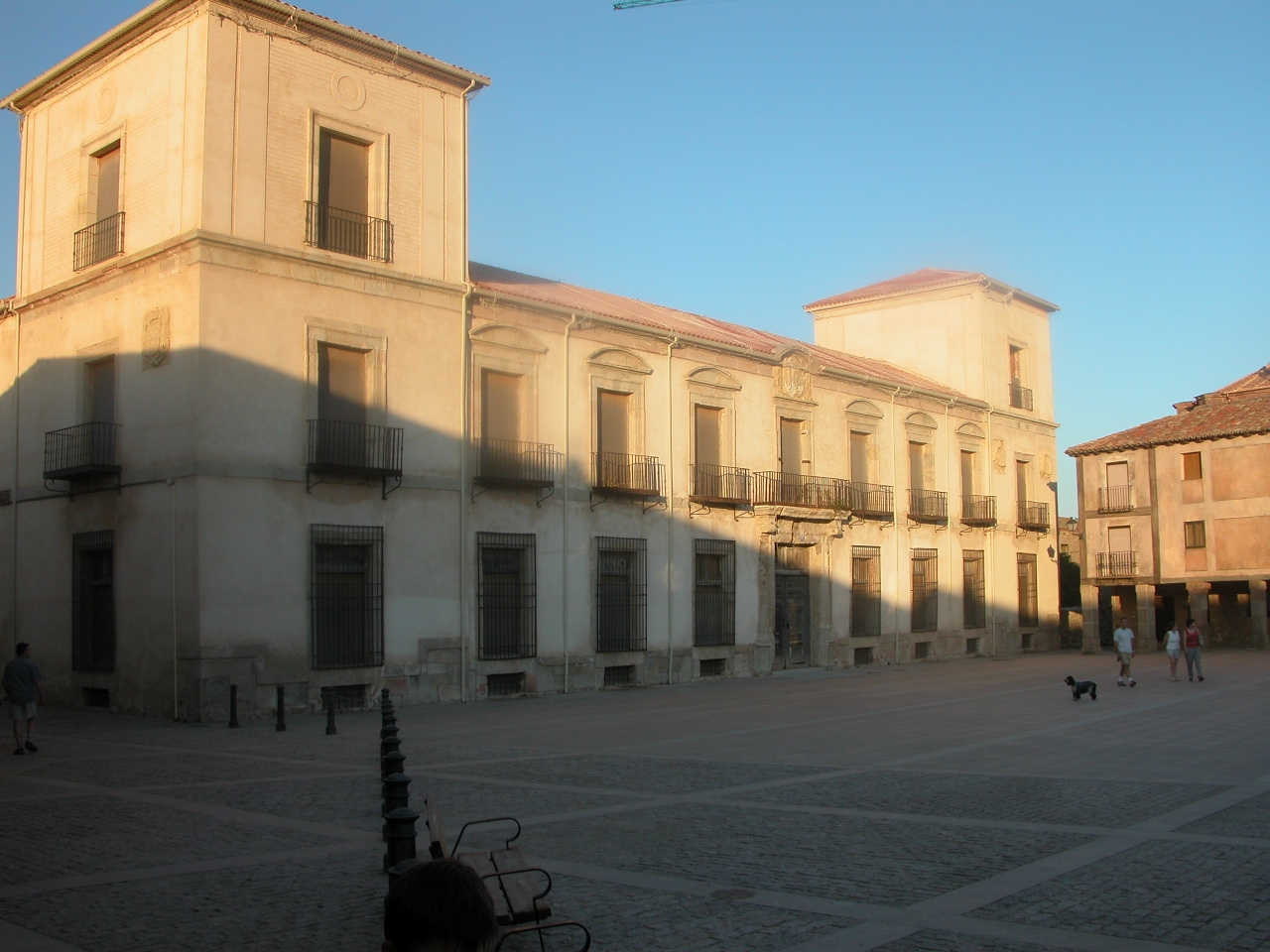
The Ducal Palace (Palacio Ducal) at Medinaceli

In 1368, the King of the Crown of Castile bestowed the title of Count of Medinaceli on Bernal de Foix, the second husband of Isabel de la Cerda. Their grandson Luis, 3rd Count of Medinaceli, eventually inherited the title and changed his family name to "de la Cerda". Later on, Queen Isabella I of Castile raised the title from Count to Duke in 1479 for Luis de la Cerda y de la Vega, 5th Count of Medinaceli.

== Counts of Medinaceli ==
- Bernal de Foix, 1st Count of Medinaceli (d. 1381). He took the side of the royal bastard Henry of Trastámara in 1368 against Henry's legitimate half-brother, King Peter of Castile. A bastard of Gaston III, Count of Foix, Bernal de Foix chose to stay in Castile when Henry had King Peter executed in March 1369 at the Castle of Montiel. He was the second husband of the wealthy Isabel de la Cerda, who was of legitimate royal descent from King Alfonso X of Castile through her grandfather.
- Gastón de Béarn y de la Cerda, 2nd Count of Medinaceli (c. 1371–1404). He was a courtier under King John I of Castile and Henry III of Castile.
- Luis de la Cerda y Mendoza, 3rd Count of Medinaceli (bef. 1404 – after 1447). He was a courtier under King John II of Castile.
- Gastón I de la Cerda, 4th Count of Medinaceli (1414–1454). He was a courtier of King John II of Castile.
- Luis de la Cerda y de la Vega, 5th Count of Medinaceli (c. 1442–1501). On 31 October 1479, he became the 1st Duke of Medinaceli.

== Dukes of Medinaceli ==
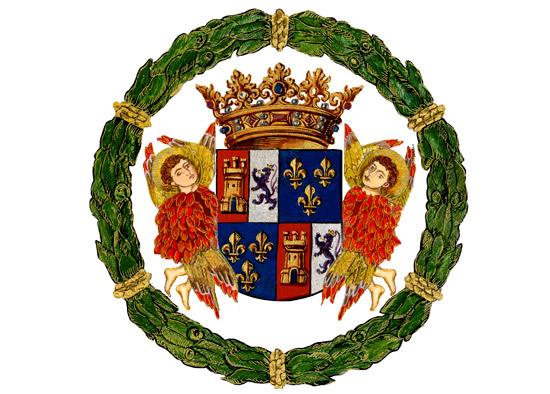
The heraldic achievement of the Ducal House of Medinaceli

Standard of the Ducal House of Medinaceli

| | Title holder | Period |
Created by Ferdinand II and Isabella I
| 1st Duke | Luis de la Cerda y de la Vega | 1479–1501 |
| 2nd Duke | Juan de la Cerda y Bique de Orejón | 1501–1544 |
| 3rd Duke | Gastón de la Cerda y Portugal | 1544–1552 |
| 4th Duke | Juan de la Cerda y Silva | 1552–1575 |
| 5th Duke | Juan de la Cerda y Portugal | 1575–1594 |
| 6th Duke | Juan de la Cerda y Aragón | 1594–1607 |
| 7th Duke | Antonio de la Cerda y Dávila | 1607–1671 |
| 8th Duke | Juan Francisco de la Cerda y Enríquez de Ribera | 1671–1691 |
| 9th Duke | Luis Francisco de la Cerda y Aragón | 1691–1711 |
| 10th Duke | Nicolás Fernández de Córdoba y de la Cerda | 1711–1739 |
| 11th Duke | Luis Fernández de Córdoba y Spínola | 1739–1768 |
| 12th Duke | Pedro de Alcántara Fernández de Córdoba y Montcada | 1768–1789 |
| 13th Duke | Luis Fernández de Córdoba y Gonzaga | 1789–1806 |
| 14th Duke | Luis Fernández de Córdoba y Benavides | 1806–1840 |
| 15th Duke | Luis Fernández de Córdoba y Ponce de León | 1840–1873 |
| 16th Duke | Luis Fernández de Córdoba y Pérez de Barradas | 1873–1879 |
| 17th Duke | Luis Fernández de Córdoba y Salabert | 1880–1956 |
| 18th Duchess | Victoria Eugenia Fernández de Córdoba | 1956–2013 |
| 19th Duke | Prince Marco of Hohenlohe-Langenburg | 2013–2016 |
| 20th Duchess | Princess Victoria of Hohenlohe-Langenburg | 2017–present |

== Biographies ==
=== 1st Duke of Medinaceli ===
Luis de la Cerda y de la Vega, 1st Duke of Medinaceli (c. 1442–1501), Count in 1454 and Duke in 1479, was the first person awarded the title of "Duke of Medinaceli". He fought in battles against Portugal and the Moorish Kingdom of Granada.

=== 2nd Duke of Medinaceli ===
Duke Juan I de la Cerda y Vique, the 2nd Duke of Medinaceli, was a bastard who was legitimated with Grandee by the Spanish Crown in 1520. He was a courtier under Queen Isabella I of Castile, her daughter Queen Joanna of Castile, and her son King Charles I of Spain. He took part in the battles for the "incorporation" of the Kingdom of Navarre on behalf of Ferdinand II of Aragon, the grandfather of King Charles I of Spain.

=== 3rd Duke of Medinaceli ===
Duke Gastón de la Cerda y Portugal, died without issue. He married María Gómez Sarmiento, daughter of the 3rd Count of Salinas and Count of Ribadeo.

=== 4th Duke of Medinaceli ===
Juan de la Cerda, 4th Duke of Medinaceli, was Viceroy of Sicily (1556–1564), and Captain General of Sicily. He was later Viceroy of Navarra (1567–1572). He married Juana Manuel de Portugal (ca. 1520–1568), daughter of Sancho I de Noronha Portugal, 2nd Count of Faro on 7 April 1541, at Ocaña.

=== 5th Duke of Medinaceli ===
Duke Juan III Luis de la Cerda y Manuel de Portugal, 5th Duke of Medinaceli, was an Ambassador in Portugal and a Knight of the Order of the Golden Fleece. He was married four times. His first wife, Isabella d'Aragona (bef. 1543 - August 1578) was the daughter of Antonio d'Aragona, (1506–1543). His second wife was Duca di Montalto and after 1578, he married Juana de la Lama. His 4th wife was Marquesa de la Adrada, daughter of Gonzalo Fernández de la Lama.

=== 6th Duke of Medinaceli ===
Duke Juan Luis de la Cerda y Aragón, 6th Duke of Medinaceli (20 May 1569 - 24 November 1607) was a Knight of the Order of the Golden Fleece. He was an Ambassador to Germanic countries. He married twice, the first time in 1564, to Ana de la Cueva, daughter of the 5th Duke of Alburquerque, Gabriel de la Cueva, Governor of the Duchy of Milano (Italy). He got married for a second time in 1606, to Antonia Dávila y Colonna (d. 29 October 1625), daughter of Gómez Dávila y de Toledo, the 2nd Marqués de Velada (d. 30 January 1599), tutor of King Philip III of Spain.

=== 7th Duke of Medinaceli ===
Duke Antonio Juan de la Cerda y Toledo (25 October 1607 – 7 March 1671), 7th Duke of Medinaceli, Grandee of Spain, and Captain General of Valencia in 1641. He was married at the age of seventeen to Ana Francisca Luisa Enriquez de Ribera y Portocarrero, who was thirteen years of age. The marriage took place on November 28, 1625, in Dos Hermanas, province of Sevilla. Ana Francisca Luisa Enríquez de Ribera y Portocarrero (bef. 19 September 1613 - 21 May 1645) was later granted the title of hereditary 5th Duchess of Alcalá de los Gazules, as daughter of Pedro Enríquez Girón de Ribera, a Knight of the Military Order of Santiago.

=== 8th Duke of Medinaceli ===
Juan Francisco de la Cerda y Portocarrero, 8th Duke of Medinaceli, (4 November 1637– 20 February 1691) was a Knight of the Order of the Golden Fleece. He was the Prime Minister of King Charles II of Spain. Medinaceli's strategies "produced fierce antipathy" between Marie-Louise of Orleans, the new Queen of Spain. He firmly believed in the rivalry between France and Spain and considered France the enemy. Therefore, he tried to isolate the young Queen from any French influence. In 1681, Medinaceli managed to have the Marquis of Villars, the French ambassador, removed from the Spanish court.

In 1685 he fell from power and was replaced by Manual Joaquín Álvarez de Toledo, 8th Count of Oropesa.

He was married at the age of sixteen to eighteen-year-old Catalina Antonia de Aragón y Folch de Cardona, 9th Duchess of Cardona, 5th Duchess of Lerma, 8th Duchess of Segorbe, on 1 May 1653 in Lucena, Province of Córdoba.

=== 9th Duke of Medinaceli ===
Duke Luis Francisco Tomás de la Cerda y de Aragón - Folch de Cardona, (1654 - in prison, in Pamplona fortress, 1711), was the 9th Duke of Medinaceli, 10th Duke of Cardona, 6th Duke of Lerma, 7th Duke of Alcalá de los Gazules, and 9th Duke of Segorbe.
