= Idiáquez =

Idiáquez may refer to:

- Alonso de Idiáquez y Yurramendi (died 1547), Spanish nobleman and politician
- Juan de Idiáquez y Olazábal (1540–1614), Spanish statesman and diplomat
- Alonso de Idiáquez Butrón y Múgica (1565–1618), Spanish soldier and councillor
- Antonio Idiáquez Manrique (1579–1615), bishop of Segovia and Ciudad Rodrigo
- Martín de Idiáquez y Camarena (born 1594), Flemish–Spanish military leader and mercenary
- Juan Alonso Idiáquez, 2nd Duke of Ciudad Real (1597–1653), Spanish naval commander
- Xavier María de Munibe e Idiáquez (1729–1785), Count of Peñaflorida, Spanish writer and intellectual
- Jorge Arturo Reina Idiáquez (born 1935), Honduran politician and diplomat

== See also ==
- Tercio of Idiáquez
