= Alonso de Idiáquez =

Alonso de Idiáquez may refer to:

- Alonso de Idiáquez y Yurramendi (c. 1497–1547)
- Alonso de Idiáquez Butrón y Múgica (1565–1618), grandson of prev.
