= Donostia (disambiguation) =

Donostia is the Basque name for Spanish city San Sebastián. It might also refer to:

- Donostia CF, previous name of football club Real Sociedad
- Donostia Award, acting honour
- Donostia-Donostia Klasikoa, cycling race
- Donostia Arena, basketball arena
- Donostia-San Sebastián International Peace Conference, 2011 conference
- Donostia/San Sebastián 2016, 2016 cultural programme
