= Munich-Montserrat Book of Hours =

1535 illuminated manuscript

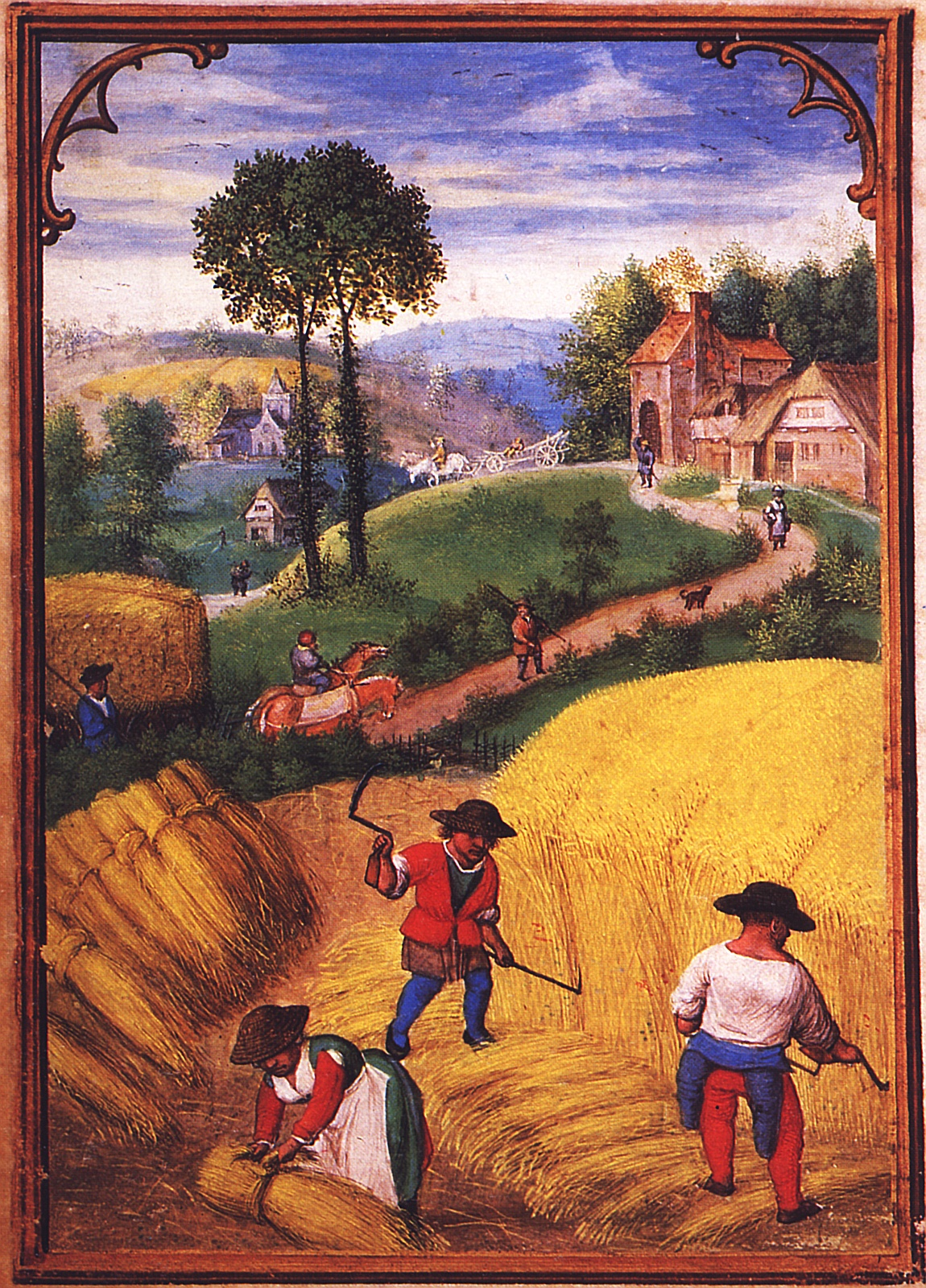
- 'August' (State Library of Bavaria)
- Artist: Simon Bening and workshop
- Year: c.1535-1540
- Medium: illuminations on vellum
- Dimensions: 14 cm × 10.3 cm (5.5 in × 4.1 in)

The Munich-Montserrat Book of Hours is a 1535 illuminated manuscript book of hours. It measured 10 by 14 cm in its original form. It was produced by Simon Bening and his workshop, possibly for Alonso de Idiaquez (died 1547), royal secretary to Charles V, Holy Roman Emperor. Its miniatures are stylistically similar to other books of hours by Bening and his workshop, such as the Da Costa Book of Hours, the Hennessy Book of Hours and the Hours of Isabella of Portugal, all produced for Spanish nobles.

202 of its sheets are now in Montserrat Abbey, forming most of the text except for those on the reverse of dispersed full-page miniatures. Those sheets include 20 small miniatures as high as 6 or 7 lines of text, 5 historiated initials at a height of 5 lines, 8 historiated page borders, and several letters and borders with floral ornament. A total of 35 leaves are now in the Bavarian State Library in Munich, the J. Paul Getty Museum (Los Angeles) and a private collection. The leaves in Munich include 12 full page miniatures illustrating the months of the year, each with a historiated border, as well as two other full-page miniatures. Five other full-page miniatures are held individually by private owners.

== History ==
=== Commissioning ===
The part held in Montserrat Abbey includes a 1578 inscription by the Spanish Inquisition guaranteeing that the work was not heretical. At that time it was in the Dominican monastery of San Telmo in San Sebastián in northern Spain and may have belonged to that monastery's founder Alonso de Idiaquez. Its images of the sufferings of the saints includes those of saint Sebastian, a favourite saint of the Habsburg rulers and their court, which may confirm that Idiaquez commissioned the work. Whilst based in Spain, he went on regular trips to the Low Countries between around 1535 and 1540 and might have commissioned the work whilst there, as did several other Spanish nobles of the period.

=== Later fate ===
Most of the book has been in Montserrat Abbey since 1858. Long before then, it had lost all its full-page miniatures and the calendar, totalling between 29 and 32 miniatures removed and dispersed. The calendar pages and two other miniatures were rediscovered in Ferdinand Maria's collection in the 17th century, possibly acquired by him around 1660 from the painter Joseph Werner. Ferdinand Maria's collections formed the original core of the State Library of Bavaria.

Other sheets were rediscovered over the course of the 20th century, with two miniatures from an English private collection bought in 1984 by the J. Paul Getty Museum in Los Angeles. Another miniature titled Christ's Arrest is known to be in the former collection of Bernard H. Breslauer and two other miniatures were recently identified at two Christie's auctions, Penitent King David (sold on 11 July 2002 as lot 13) and Pentecost (sold on 16 November 2005 as lot 6).

== Original composition ==
This was reconstructed by the US art historian Thomas Kren.

Composition of the Book of Hours
| Chapter | Folios | Number of full-page miniatures (and lost miniatures) | Miniatures (and collection, if not Montserrat Abbey) | Example of miniatures |
|---|---|---|---|---|
| Calendar | 2v-14 (Munich) | 12 | January to December | January |
| Extracts from the Gospels | 403-404 | 1 lost | [Saint John on Patmos] | |
| Passion according to Saint John | 1-24 | 1 | Christ's Arrest (Breslauer collection) | |
| Hours of the Virgin Mary | 25-164 | 2 (and 6 lost) | Matins (The Creation of Eve), [Laudes, Prime, Tierce, Sexte], Nones (The Flood), [Vespers and Compline] | |
| Penitential psalms and litanies | 355-402 | 1 | David at prayer (private collection) | |
| Office of the Dead | 165-206 | (1 lost) | [Mass for the Dead] | |
| Hours of the Cross | 267-280 | (1 lost) | [Crucifixion] | |
| Hours of the Holy Spirit | 281-292 | 1 | Pentecost (private collection) | Pentecost |
| Various prayers | 293-315 | (4 lost) | [Saint Veronica], Mass of Saint Gregory (J. Paul Getty Museum), [Stabat Mater : Pietà], [Obsecro te : Madonna and Child] | Mass of Saint Gregory |
| Sufferings of the saints | ? | 1 | The Martyrdom of Saint Sebastian (J. Paul Getty Museum) | The Martyrdom of Saint Sebastian |

== Bibliography ==
- McKendrick, Scot; Kren, Thomas (2003). Illuminating the Renaissance : The Triumph of Flemish Manuscript Painting in Europe. Los Angeles: Getty Publications. pp. 474-476 (notice 154). ISBN 978-0-89236-704-7.
- Kren, Thomas (1998). "Landscape as Leitmotif, a Reintegrated Book of Hours Illuminated by Simon Bening". In Michelle Brown; Scot McKendrick (eds.). Illuminating the Book, Makers and Interpreters: Essays in Honour of Janet Backhouse. London: British Library. pp. 209–232.
- Thomas Kren and Johannes Rathofer, Simon Bening's Flemish calendar: complete facsimile of Munich Bayerische Staatsbibliothek Clm. 23638, Luzern, 1988
- Thomas Kren, « Two miniatures by Simon Bening from the Munich/ Montserrat Hours », in Caroline Zoehl and Mara Hofmann (dir.), Von Kunst und Temperament : Festschrift fűr Eberhard Koenig zum 60. Geburtstag, Turnhout, Brepols, 2007, vol. 13 in series « Ars Nova: Studies in Late Medieval and Renaissance Northern Painting and Illumination », 334 p., ISBN 978-2-503-52609-6, pp. 143–48
