= Juan Alonso Idiáquez, 2nd Duke of Ciudad Real =

Spanish noble & naval commander (1597-1653)

Juan Alonso Idiáquez, 2nd Duke of Ciudad Real (1597 in Milan – 25 November 1653), was a Spanish noble and naval commander.

== Biography ==
He was the son of Alonso de Idiáquez de Butrón y Muxica, an important army commander, who created the Tercio of Idiaquez, and fought many battles in Flanders, Italy and France. For this, he was created Duke of Ciudad Real, Marquis of San Damián, Count of Aramayona and Biandrina. Juan Alonso inherited all these titles from his father.

In 1637, he became head of the Cavalry in Catalonia and participed in the Battle of Leucate.
Juan Alonso then became Governor of Cádiz, and it was in this function that he fought two important naval battles.

In 1641, he won the Battle of Cape St. Vincent against a Dutch fleet. Because of this, he was chosen the next year to lead a large Spanish fleet, destined to break the Siege of Perpignan by the French. But he lost the Battle of Barcelona against a French fleet under Jean Armand de Maillé-Brézé.

He became Trece of the Order of Santiago, Governor and Captain General of Galicia and the Basque Country.
He was also Ballestero Mayor, war counsellor and Gentleman of the Bedchamber of King Philip IV of Spain.

== Marriage and Children ==
He married in 1613 with Ana María de Álava y Guevara, 2nd Countess of Tribiana. They had 3 children:

- Mariana, 3rd Countess of Triviana (?–1670), married Alfonso de Silva Cerda y Guzmán, no issue.
- Isabel, 4th Countess of Triviana (?–?), married Pedro de Villela y Zorrilla, had issue
- Francisco Alfonso (1620–1687), his successor, married Francisca de Borja y Aragón, had issue.

== Sources ==
- Real Academia de la Historia

Government offices
Preceded by The Marquess of Cerralbo	Governor of Galicia; 1624–1625	Succeeded by The Count of Gondomar
Spanish nobility
Preceded by Alonso de Idiáquez Butrón y Múgica	Duke of Ciudad Real; 1618–1653	Succeeded by Francisco Alonso de Idiázquez y Álava
