= San Telmo Museoa =

Museum in Basque Country, Spain

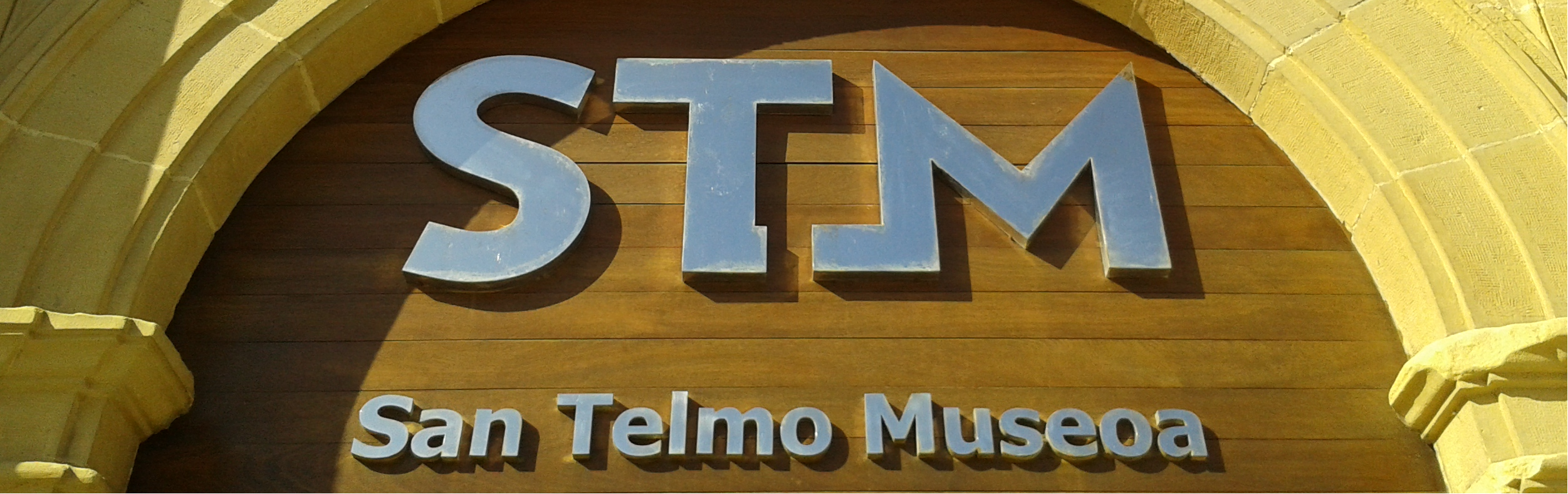
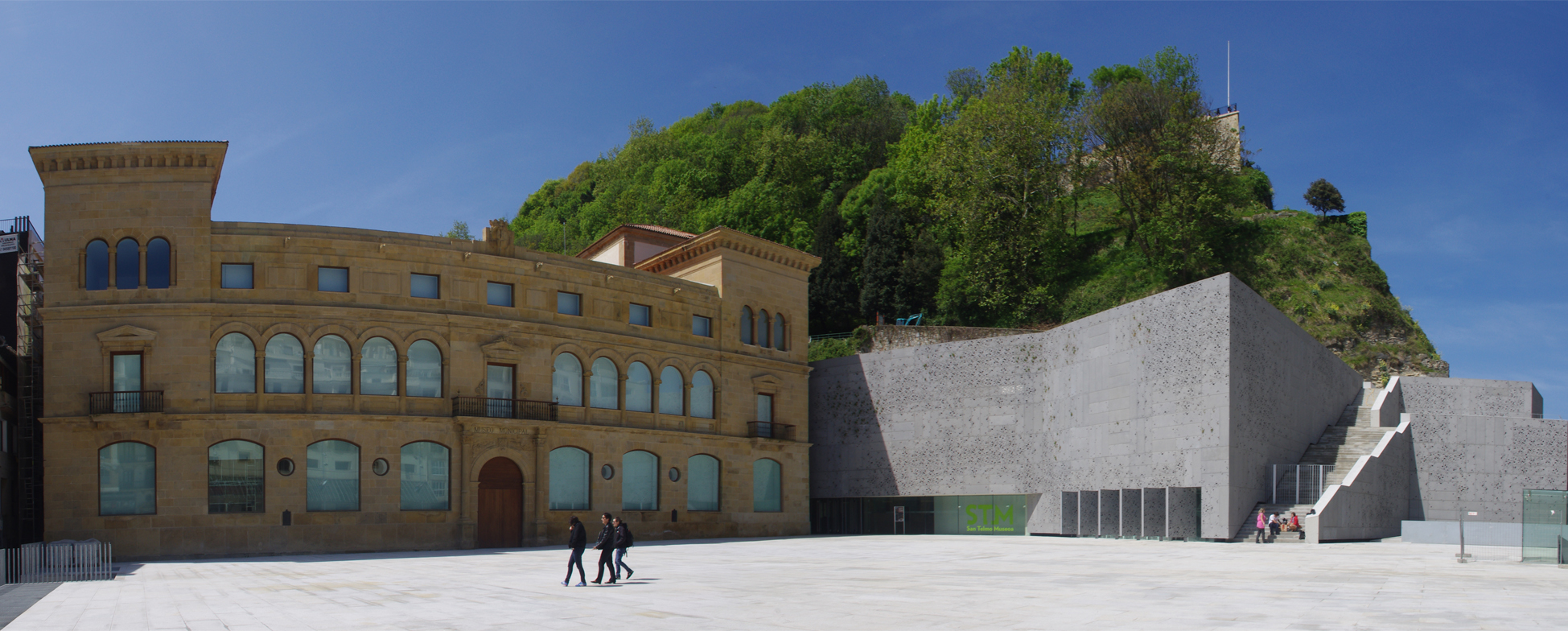
- Setting of San Telmo Museoa at the foot of the hill Urgull by the ocean

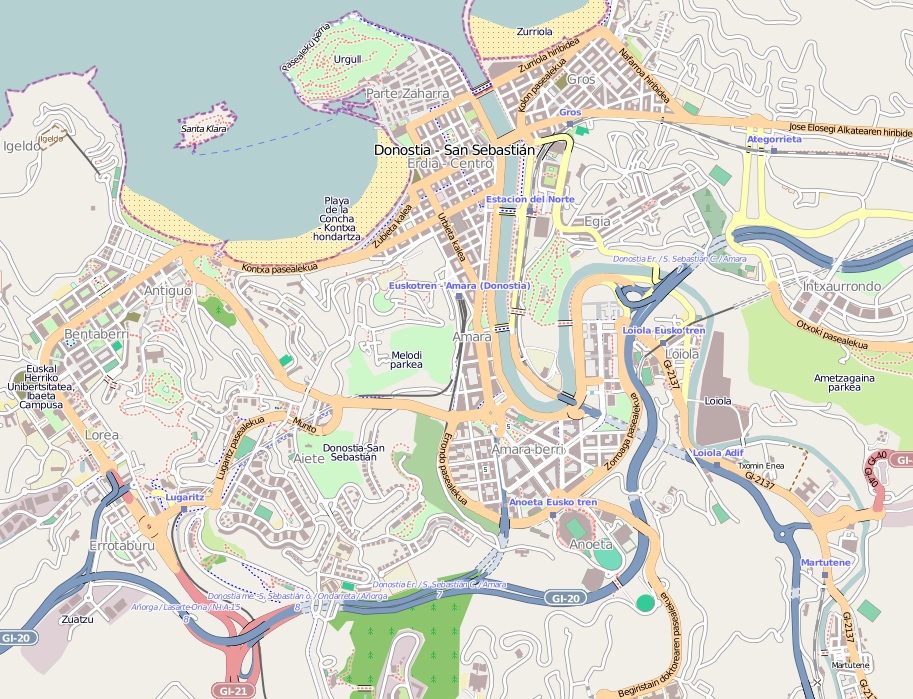
- Location within the city of Donostia-San Sebastián
- Established: 5 October 1902
- Location: Zuloaga plaza, 1; 20003 San Sebastián; Basque Country, Spain
- Coordinates: 43°19′30″N 1°59′06″W
- Type: Art museum History museum Ethnography; Photography; Archeology
- Collection size: 26,000
- Visitors: 261.880 (2015)
- Director: Susana Soto
- Owner: City of Donostia-San Sebastián
- Website: San Telmo Museoa

San Telmo Museoa (English: San Telmo Museum, or STM) is a museum of the Basque society located in Donostia-San Sebastián, addressing old and contemporary Basque culture, arts and history in a European, global context. It moved to its current location in 1932, Zuloaga plaza in the old town, at the foot of the hill Urgull. It occupies a former Dominican monastery complemented by a 21st-century extension.

San Telmo is presented as a museum and, at the same time, as a place to disseminate knowledge and create thought; it is an instrument to understand the present and build the future from encounters with the past and with our roots. In 2011, a major makeover of its facilities took place by adding an extension to the convent and reshaping its facilities along the lines of its new conceptual approach as a museum of the Basque society and citizenship. The museum received a Special Mention in the 2013 best European museum contest organized annually by the Museum Forum.

== History ==
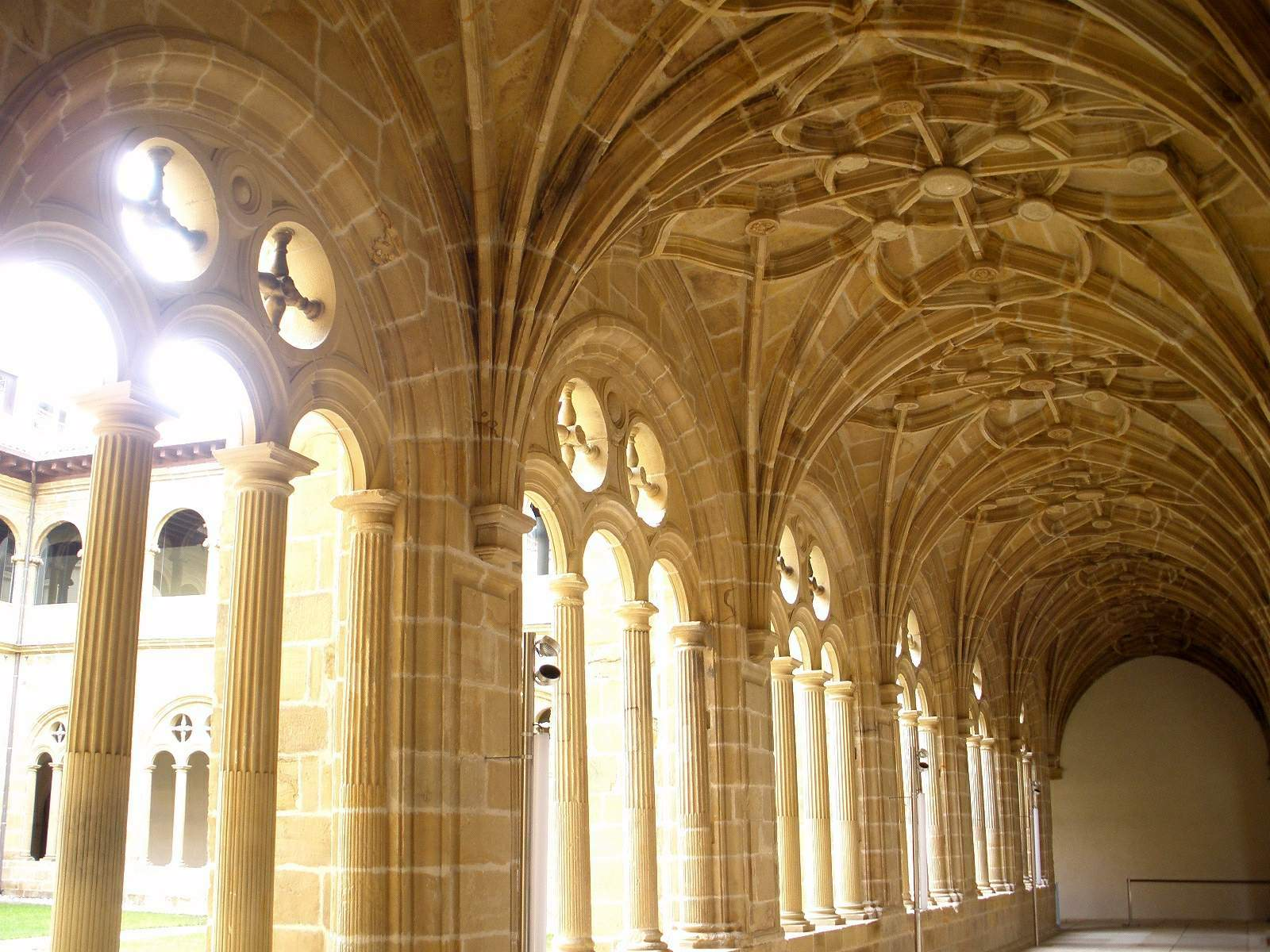
16th-century cloister arcade

The Basque Society of Friends of the Country showed an interest in opening a museum for the city following the success received by the exhibitions arranged in the city during the late 19th century, so the society addressed a formal request to the Municipal Council to found a Municipal Museum. At the moment of its establishment in 1902, the San Telmo Museoa was located on the corner between calle Andia and Garibai, but it soon became too small to hold its collection, so in 1905 a new location was chosen in a new building, shared with the Municipal Library and the School of Arts and Professions.

In 1932, it further moved to its present-day location at the San Telmo monastery, purchased and fitted out by the City. The new museum featured for the inauguration event in its new location a concert conducted by Manuel de Falla in a church decorated with the accomplished canvases designed by the Catalan Josep Maria Sert, whose murals also embellish the walls of the Council Chamber at the Palace of Nations in Geneva.

After serving for decades as an ethnographic museum, in 2009 the museum was revamped and updated with new works under way. Two years of reforms led to the museum's reopening in 2011 with new modern facilities as museum of Basque society and citizenship. This oldest museum in the Basque Country brings its rich intellectual and patrimonial legacy right into the 21st century, as well as acting as the parental centre for the network of local museums spreading over Gipuzkoa. The museum received a Special Mention in the 2013 museum contest organized by the Museum Forum.

== Construction ==
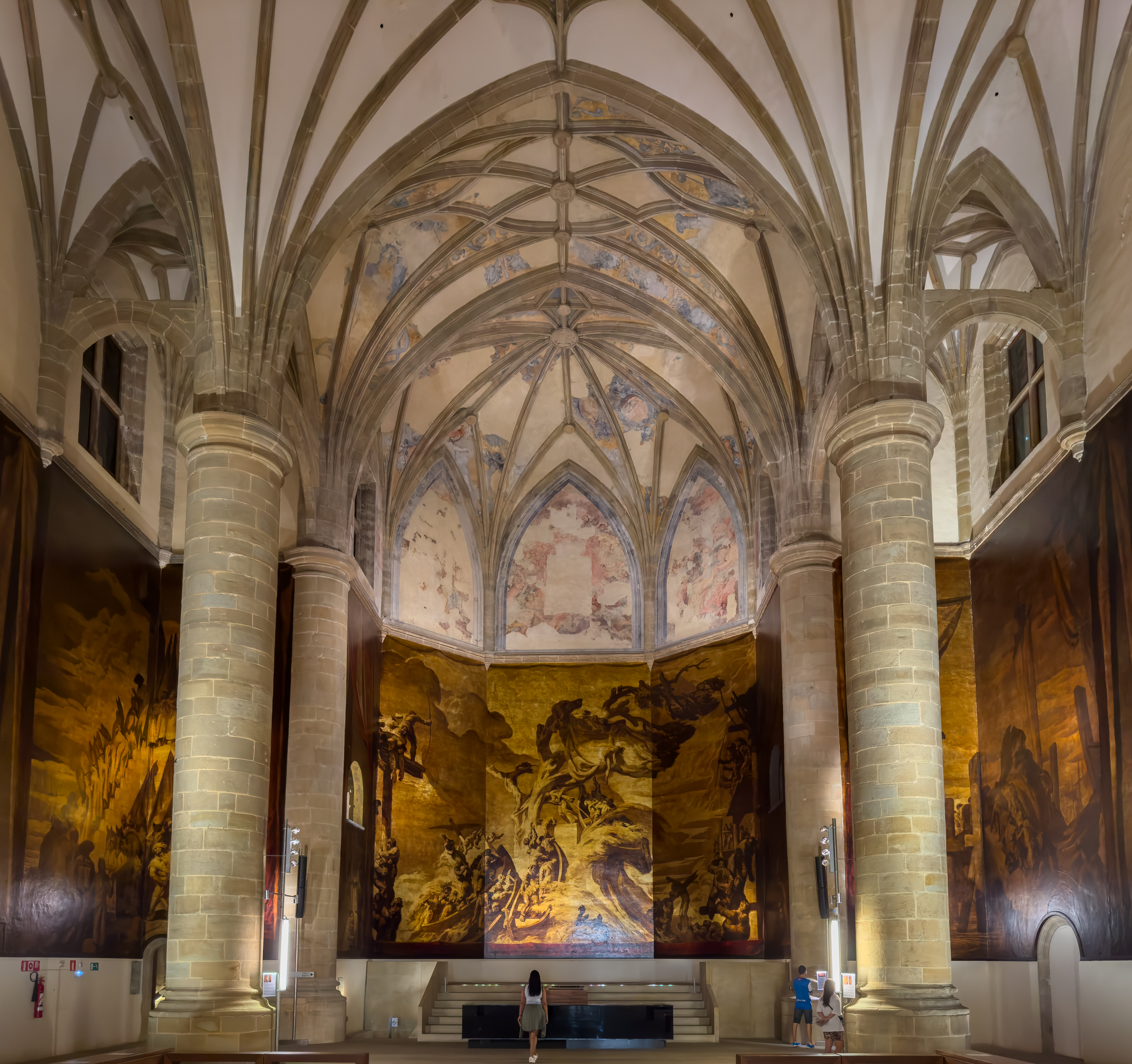
Interior of the San Telmo church and Sert's canvases on the altar walls

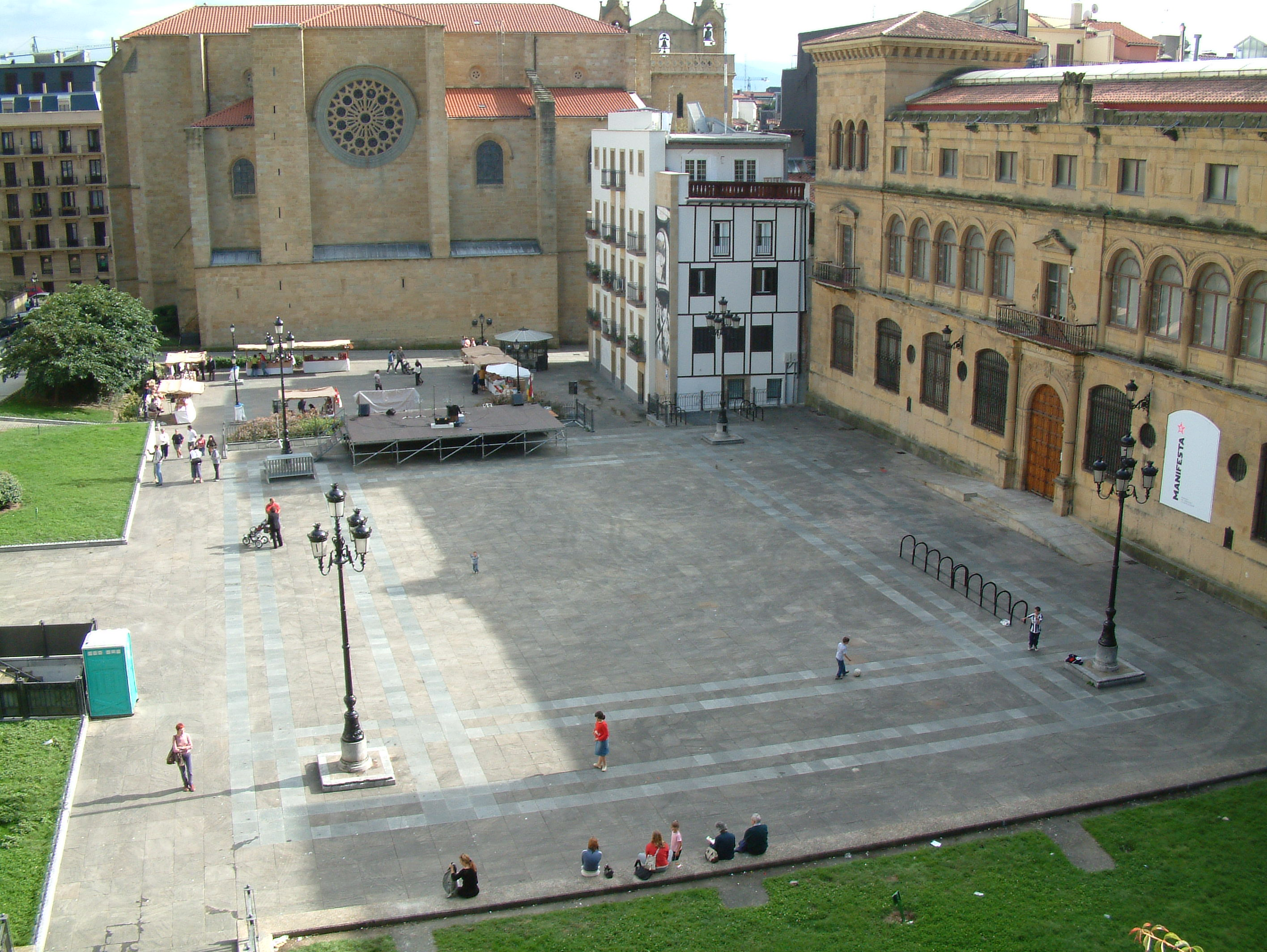
Zuloaga plaza, San Telmo Museoa and the Church of San Vicente

=== Mutating original site ===
The original building complex dates from the 16th century, erected to accommodate a Dominican convent. It includes a church, a cloister and the tower. The monastery's patrons belonged to wealthy families from the area: Alonso de Idiaquez, hailing from Tolosa and secretary of the emperor Charles V, and his wife Gracia de Olazabal, from a wealthy family in Donostia. Major construction work commenced in 1544 and was completed in 1562.

The building was shaped in a transitional style between Gothic and Renaissance style, coming to be known as "Elizabethan" style. While based on a Gothic structure, its upper extension shows Renaissance elements. The cloister, modeled after the layout for Dominican temples implemented in Salamanca's Convent of San Esteban, shows some signature features, the main one being its unusual location right at the beginning of the church nave, due to the proximity of the hill.

In 1813, at the end of the Peninsular War, San Sebastián was besieged, ransacked and razed to the ground by the relieving British and Portuguese troops, and the convent suffered extensive damage. In 1836, the Spanish premier Juan Álvarez Mendizábal ordered major ecclesiastic confiscations resulting in the expulsion of the Dominican friars and the conversion of the convent into artillery barracks.

In 1913, the poor state of the monastery led to the classification of the tower as a National Monument. The city expressed interest in purchasing the whole complex, which it did in 1929. It reopened in 1932, now as the venue for the municipal ethnographic museum, with an attached Renaissance-style façade that remains in place to this day.

=== 2011 makeover ===
In 2007, the museum was closed to undertake major reforms that would feature "a new narrative". After four years, the museum reopened on 19 April 2011, with the institution reporting an investment of 28.5 million euros. The inauguration event was attended by the lehendakari Patxi Lopez, Maria Jose Aranburu, Culture Secretary of the regional council (diputación/aldundia), and Susana Soto, director of the museum.

The ambitious project of refurbishment and enlargement, designed by the architects Fuensanta Nieto and Enrique Sobejano, features a modern extension of the old site into the lower wedge of the hill Urgull, thus allowing for further space to accommodate new cultural and commercial uses, as well as easing access for both visitors and collections. The new two pavilions have replaced a former building added in the mid-20th century altering the original concept of the monument, so it was subject to demolition on the commencement of the work. The main entrance, besides providing direct access to the old buildings, constitutes a natural link with the new areas for cloakrooms, shop, events room, cafeteria, and all the necessary spaces needed in a museum of this kind.

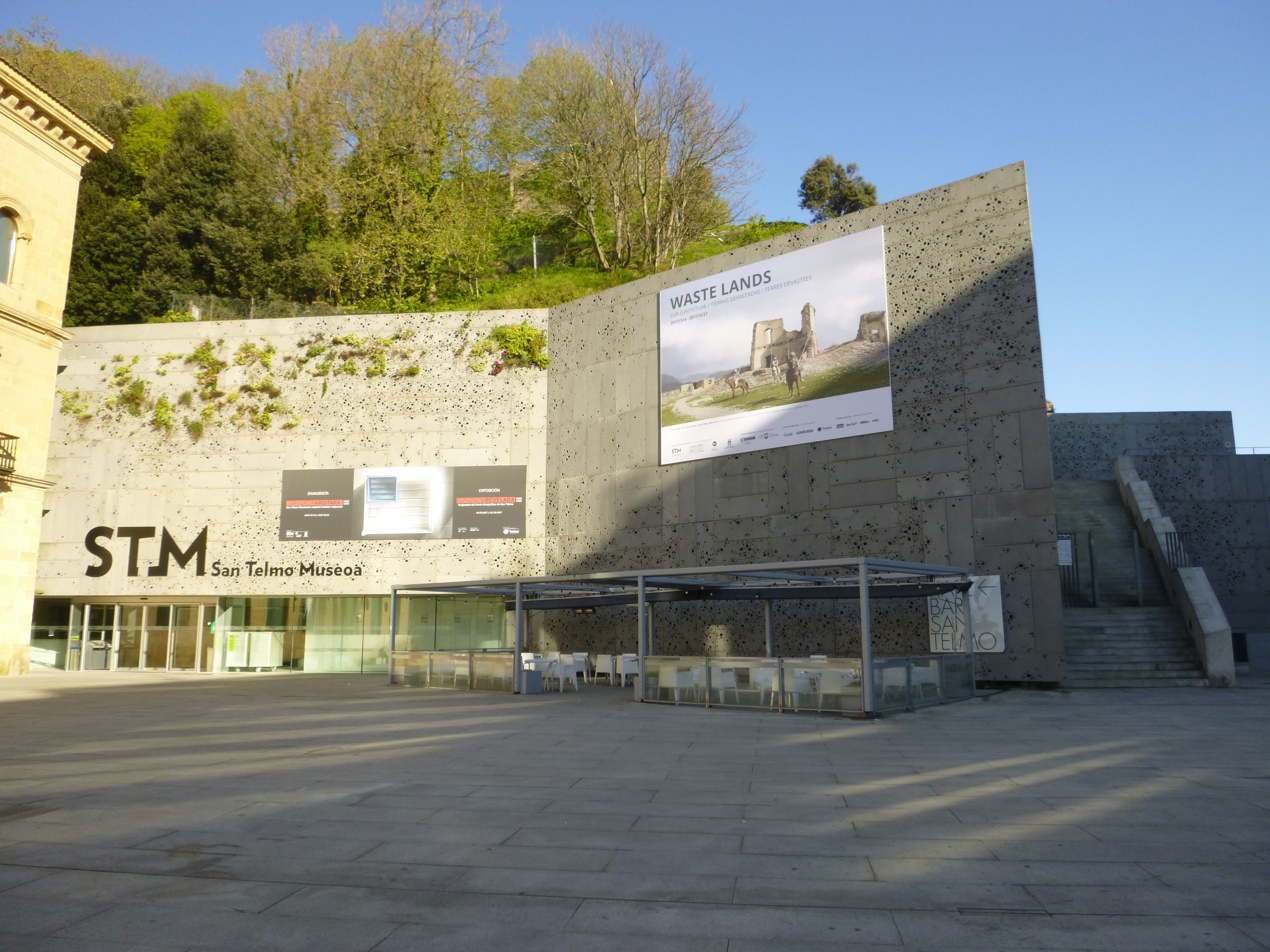
South front of the museum

With a view to minimizing the visual impact of the pavilions, the façade features holes pierced into 3,000 molten aluminum panels covering the fronts and mimicking erosion holes on the rock with vegetation overhanging out of them, creating a vegetation layer that changes with the seasons. Its transitional location between town and country provides the backdrop for its porous façade dotted with vegetation pouring out like a skin for the hill Urgull. In addition, the non-vegetated holes allow for natural lighting that illuminates the interior, letting light shafts and shadows into the rooms. Conversely, at night they allow for artificial lighting projected to the exterior. The masterminds behind this design are Leopoldo Ferran and Agustina Otero.

The museum's permanent exhibition remains for the most part in the church and the chambers of the refurbished original complex; however, the extension also accommodates sections of the permanent exhibition, totalling a surface of approximately 3,000 m^{2} including the church. The temporary exhibition area amounts to 1,000 m^{2}, distributed over the new building and the convent chapels. Extension pavilions also house the events room with a 300-person capacity, labs, workshops, and a shop. The ground floor features a restaurant with an experimental vocation.

The rehabilitation of the convent has revealed remains of Mannerist paintings in the church apse, researched by Pedro Echeverria from the Basque public university, UPV-EHU, linked to the most relevant painters of the period. These paintings make the church more attractive, alongside the renowned large-format canvases by Josep Maria Sert. On re-opening in 2011, the goal of the new museum was not just to remain a museum, but to become a cultural venue on a par with the likes of the Musée du Quai Branly in Paris, or the V&A Museum in London. At any rate, with regards to architecture, the building of San Telmo remains a spot specially suited to its city and citizens, as well as remaining a landmark on the international scene.

== Collections ==
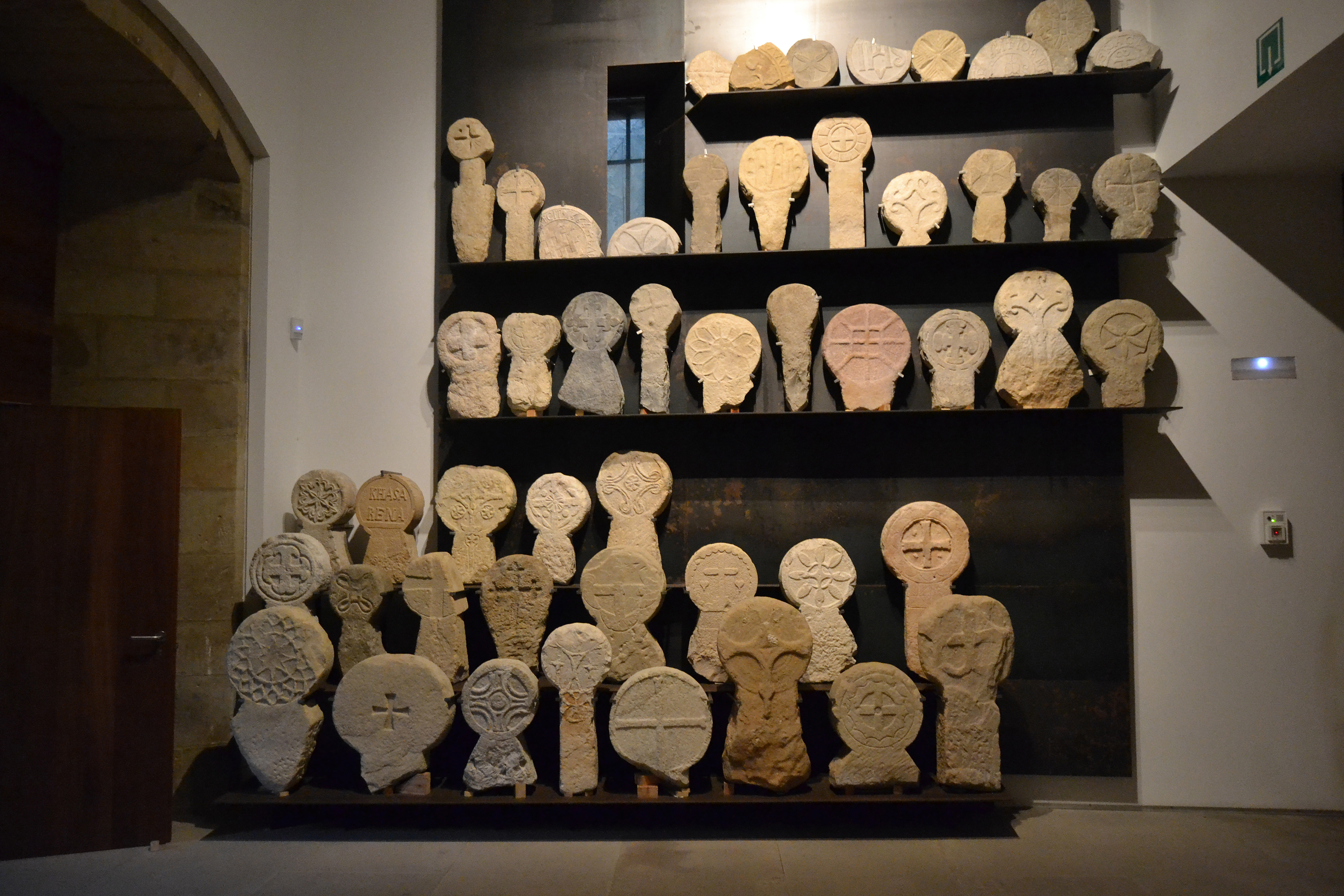
Part of the Basque stela collection displayed in San Telmo

The itinerary followed in the museum shows different thematic areas consolidating the concept of a museum of society with a civic vocation that provide the basis for the renovated museum. The items in display on the permanent exhibition range from a funerary stele collection included in the section "Signs of Spirituality", to later items like Muhammad XI of Granada, "Boabdil"s sword, or Ignatius of Loyola's spiritual exercises, to modern objects, such as bicycles, a Seat 600 car, or historic Real Sociedad and Athletic Club Bilbao football jerseys showcased in the "Awakening of Modernity" section.

The close links of the Basques to the ocean, whale hunting, iron extraction, and manufacturing holds also a prominent place in the museum, along with the domains of religion and art. The museum thus treasures important art funds made up of paintings and sculptures, with a 200 artworks selection on show. They include artworks by important authors like El Greco, Sorolla, or Ignacio Zuloaga, arranged in two different itineraries.

Inside the church, the "Challenges for Our Society" audiovisual is projected ushering the audience into an itinerary summarizing the key challenges for the Basque society in the near future, i.e. sustainability, interculturality, equality, Europe, and Human Rights.

== Temporary exhibitions ==
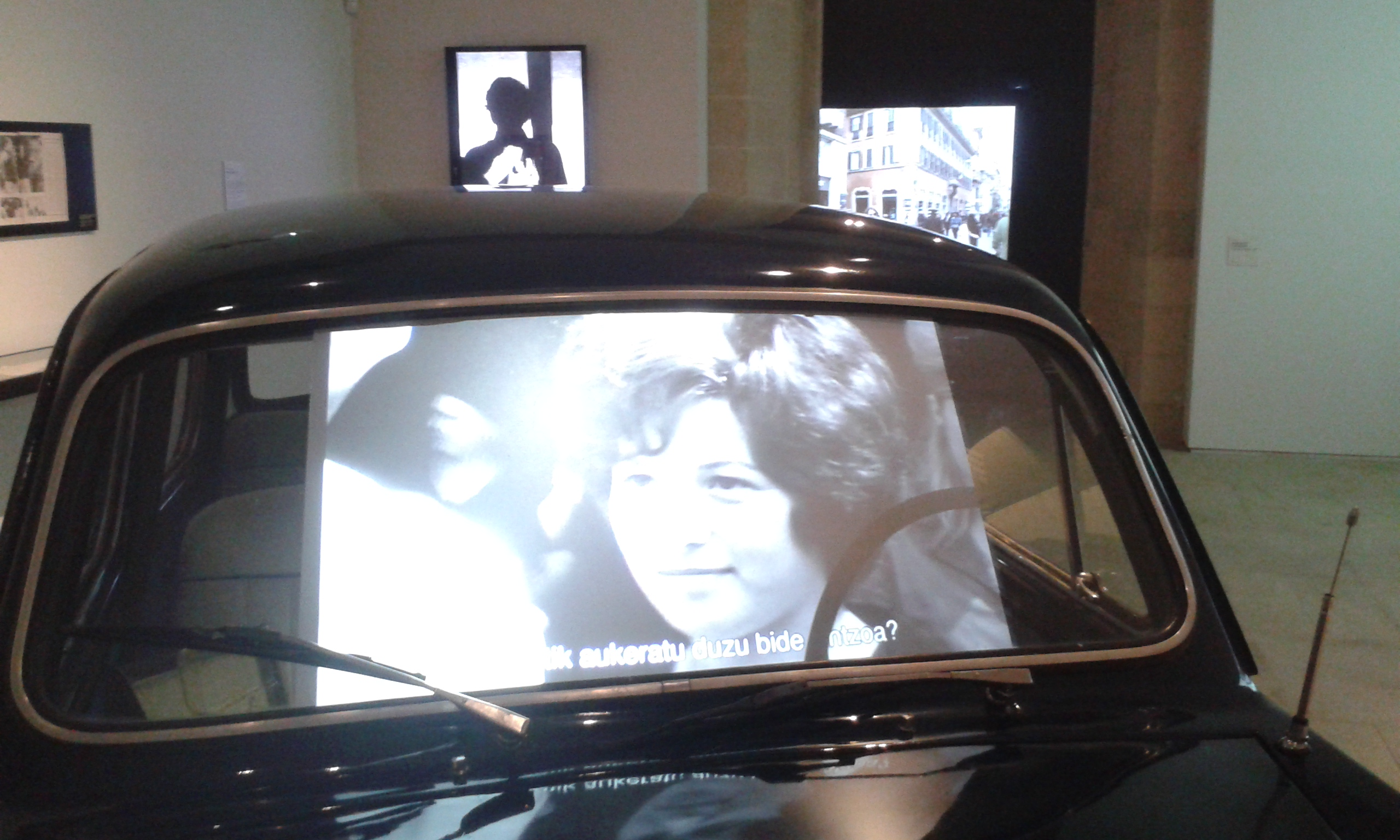
Period car in the exhibition Roma Pasolini (2015) displaying Comizi d'Amore sequences

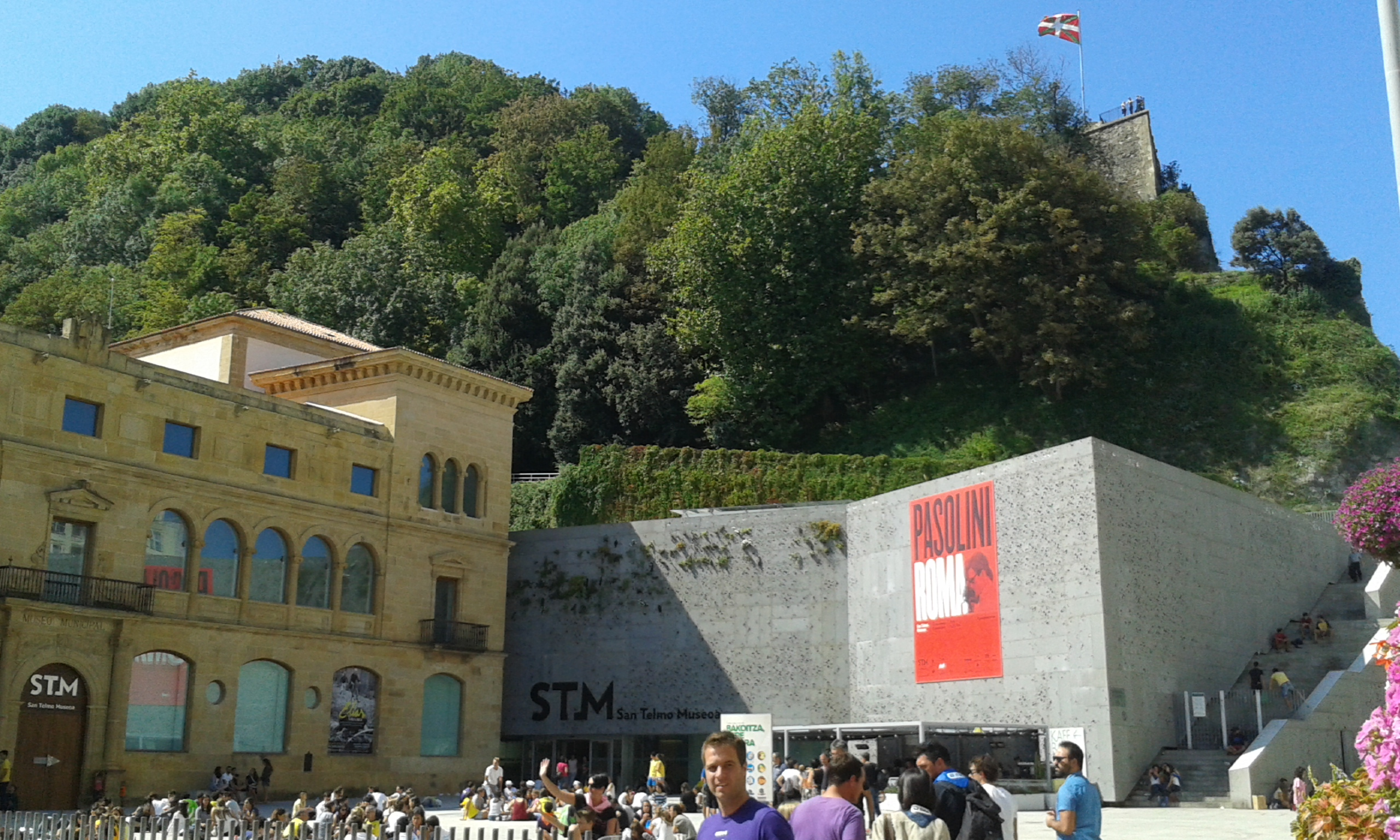
Old building and extension during the exhibition Roma Pasolini

Besides the permanent exhibition, housed for the most part in the old building complex, the museum hosts temporary exhibitions accommodated in the newly erected facilities. Starting in June 2016, the museum features the Peace Treaties in Art exhibition in step with the city's European capitality of culture. However, the museum deals with a variety of topics comprised within its scope as a museum of society and citizenship bridging past and future by addressing the challenges of the present.

Not long after the museum's re-opening, in autumn 2011, a temporary exhibition took place on Federico Fellini that put on display more than 400 items, including photographs, drawings, magazines, cartoons, interviews and film sequences, some of them unknown to date, revealing to the public this formidable director's universe.

Fast forward, from January to October 2015, the museum played host to the exhibition Pasolini Roma, featuring Pier Paolo Pasolini's literary and cinematographic work along with biographic details of the prolific and controversial Italian poet, film director and intellectual. The exhibition in San Telmo was one of the stops followed in this itinerant exhibition across Europe, also showing in Barcelona, Berlin, Paris and Rome. The exhibition was combined with related film screenings, a debate with film-makers, as well as a Pasolini soiree.

After the conclusion of Pasolini's exhibit, another one was inaugurated in January 2016, "Gaur konstelazioak", this time focusing on the influential Basque artistic group Gaur established in the mid-60s as an artistic reaction to Franco's dictatorship and in defense of the oppressed Basque identity. The exhibition displayed works of renowned artists that participated the group, such as Jorge Oteiza, Jose Luis Zumeta, or Eduardo Chillida, as well as José Antonio Sistiaga, or Nestor Basterretxea, to mention a few.

Fifty years have lapsed since that dissident artistic group clustered around the Galeria Barandiaran, so the occasion was seized to pay homage by means of this exhibition to the driving force behind the project Gaur, the local entrepreneur and philanthropist Dionisio Barandiaran. The exhibition was presented jointly with Kairos, a contemporary art section establishing a dialogue and bridging the gap with Gaur and other artists of today.

== Gallery ==
San Telmo views

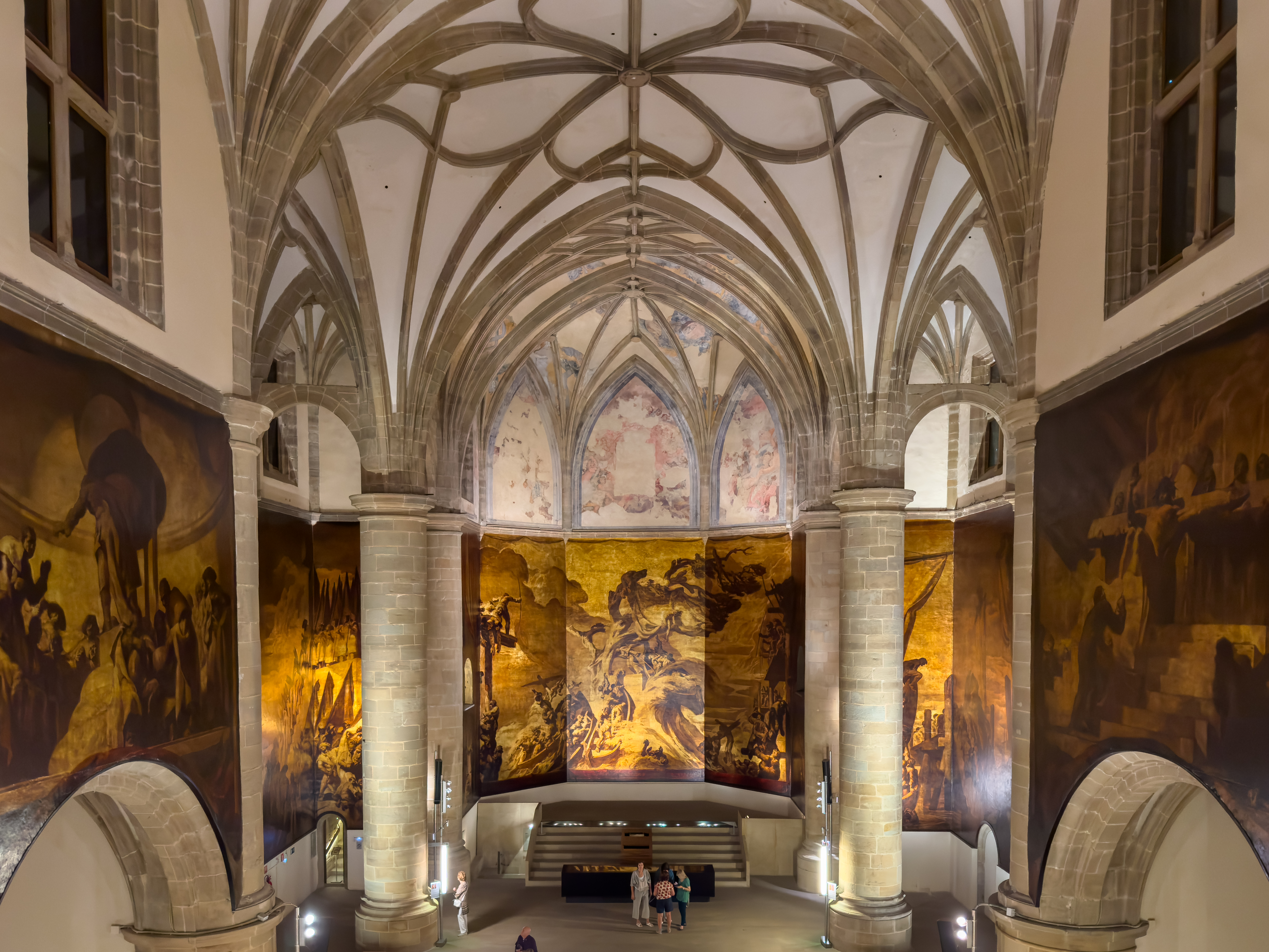

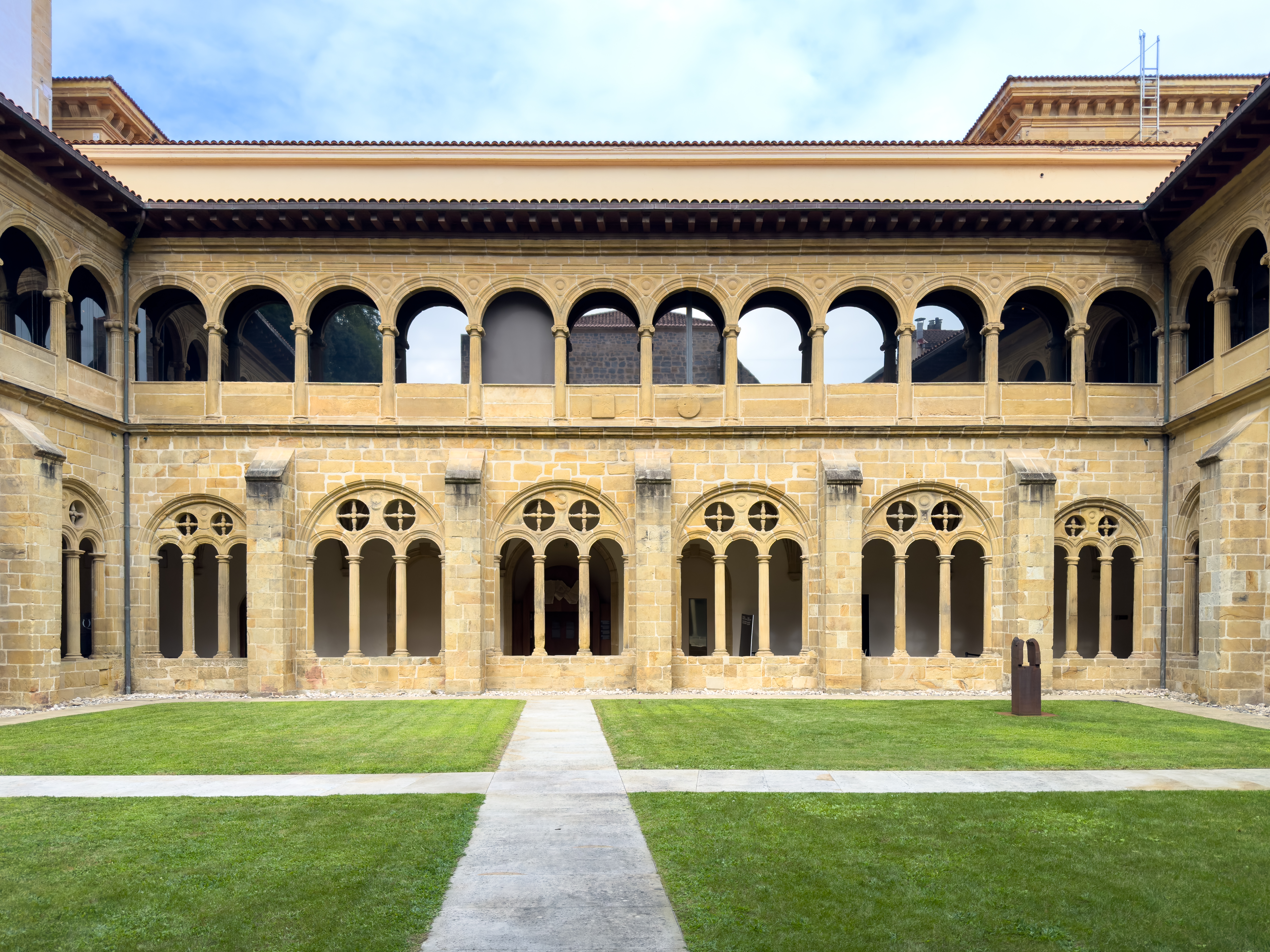
Cloister

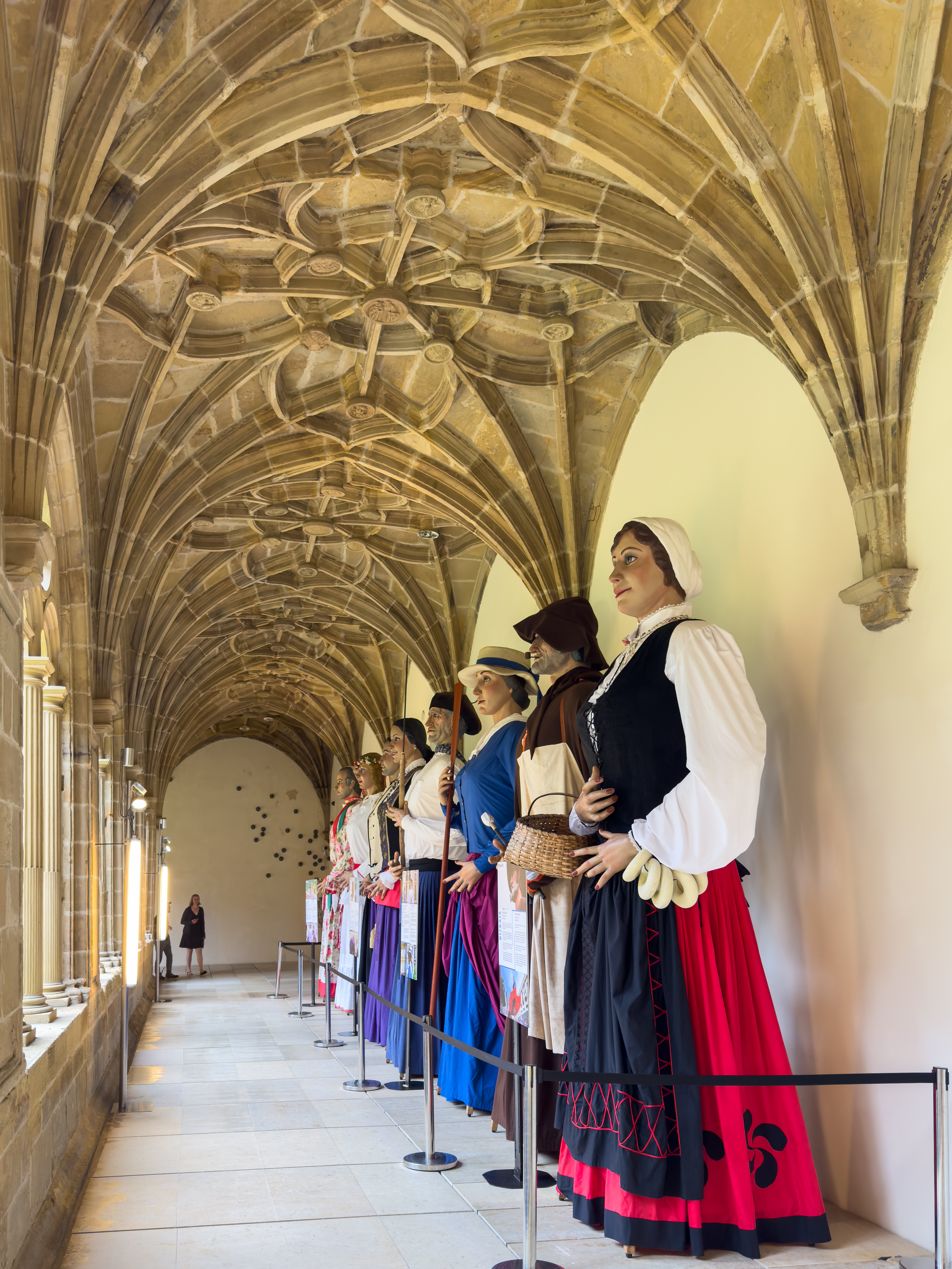

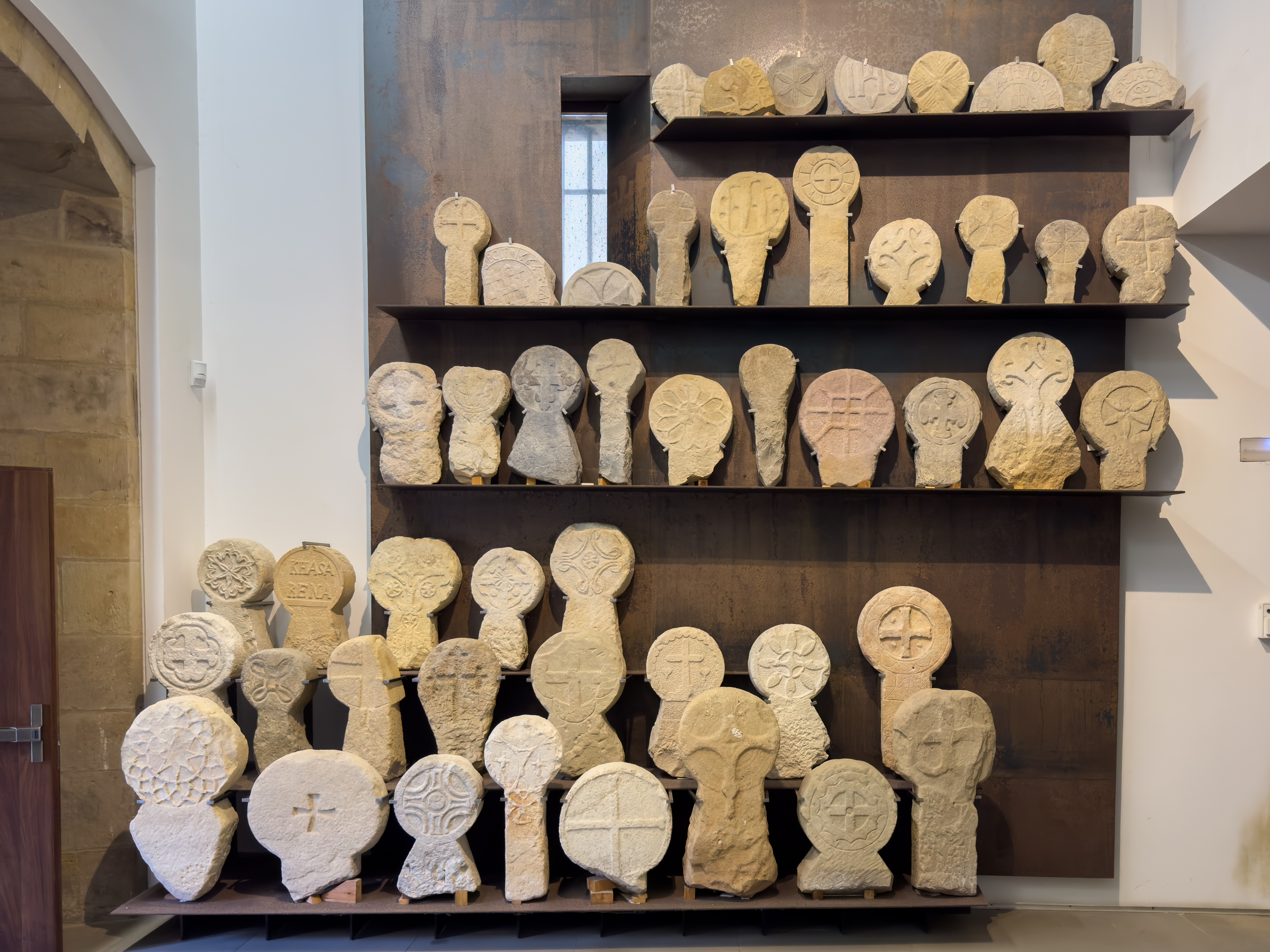

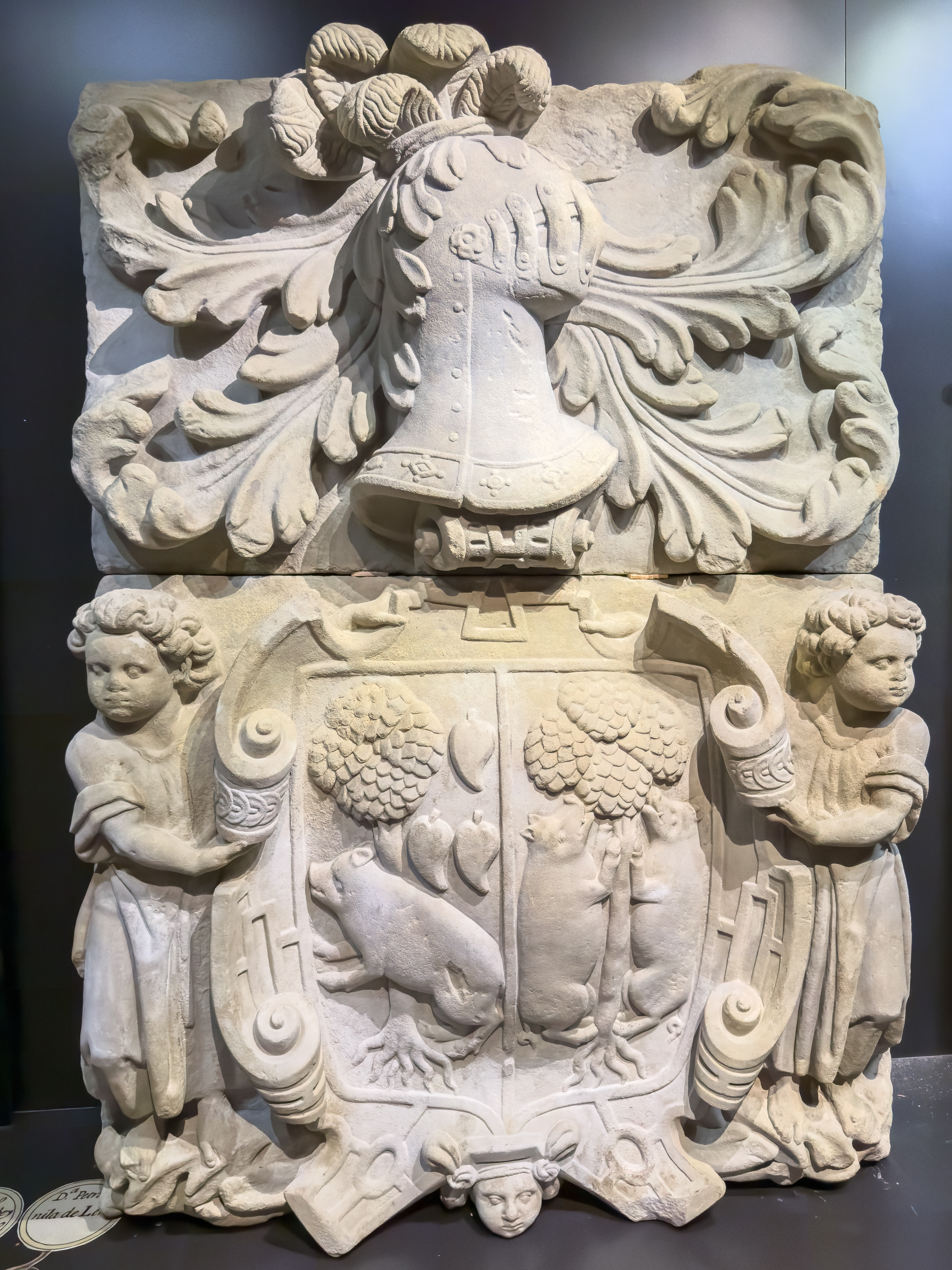

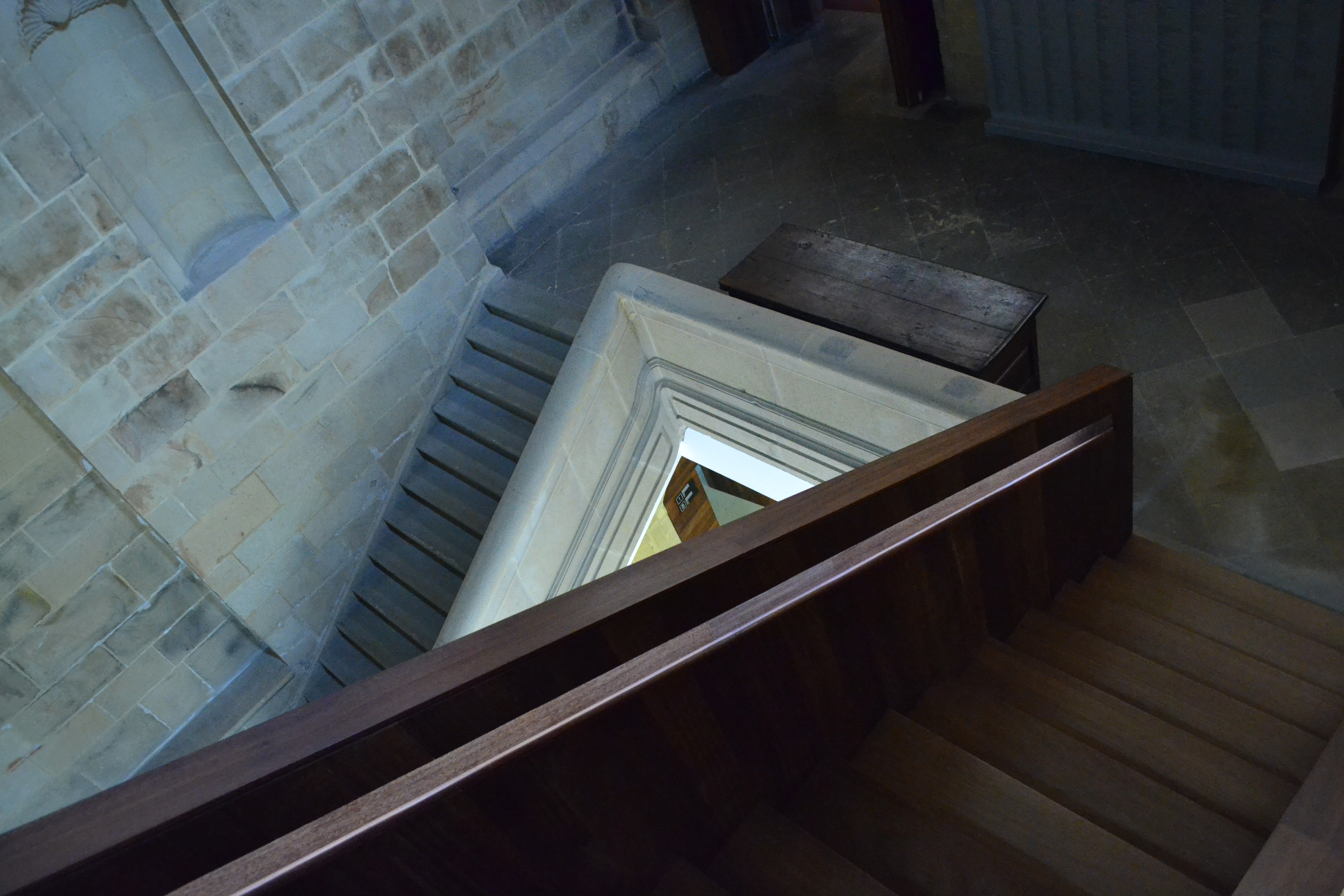
Stairs starting at the cloister

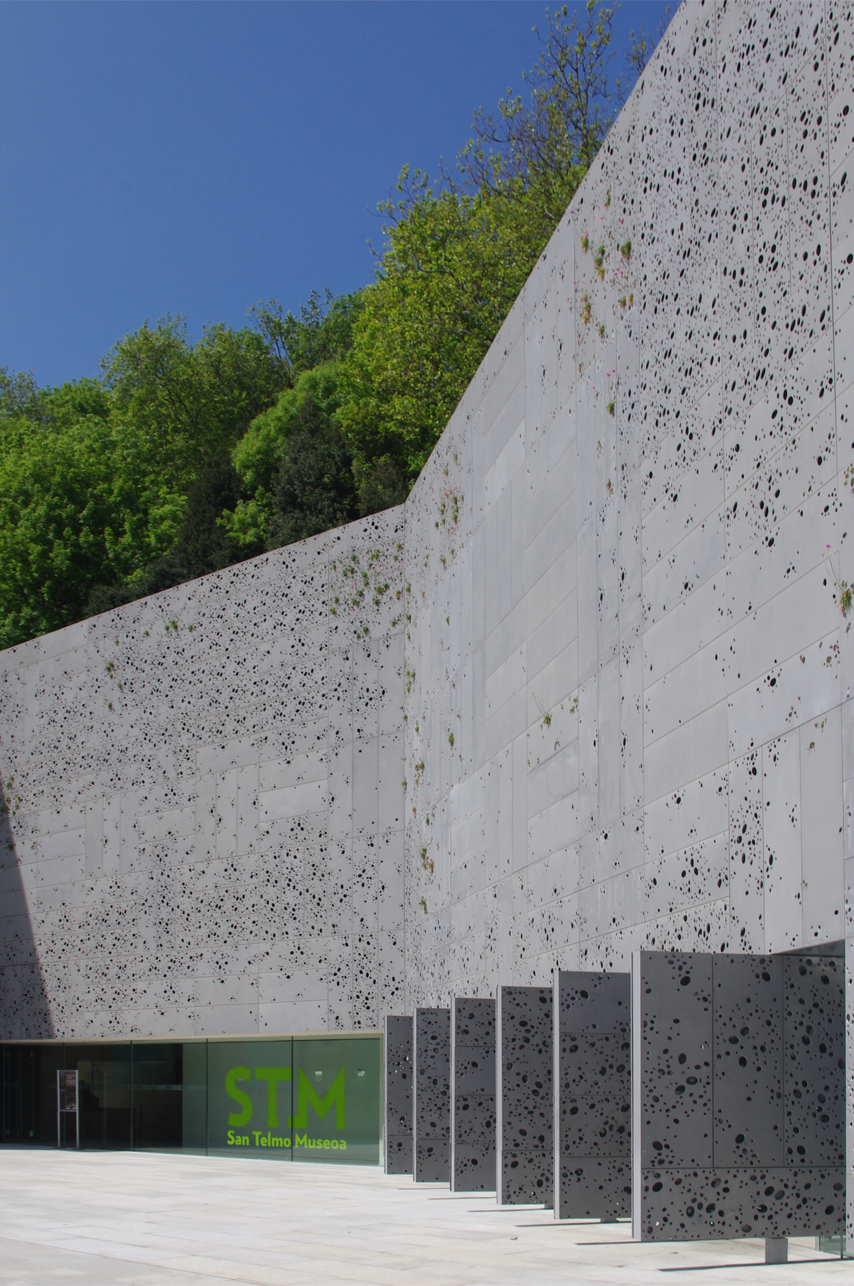
Partial view of the façade

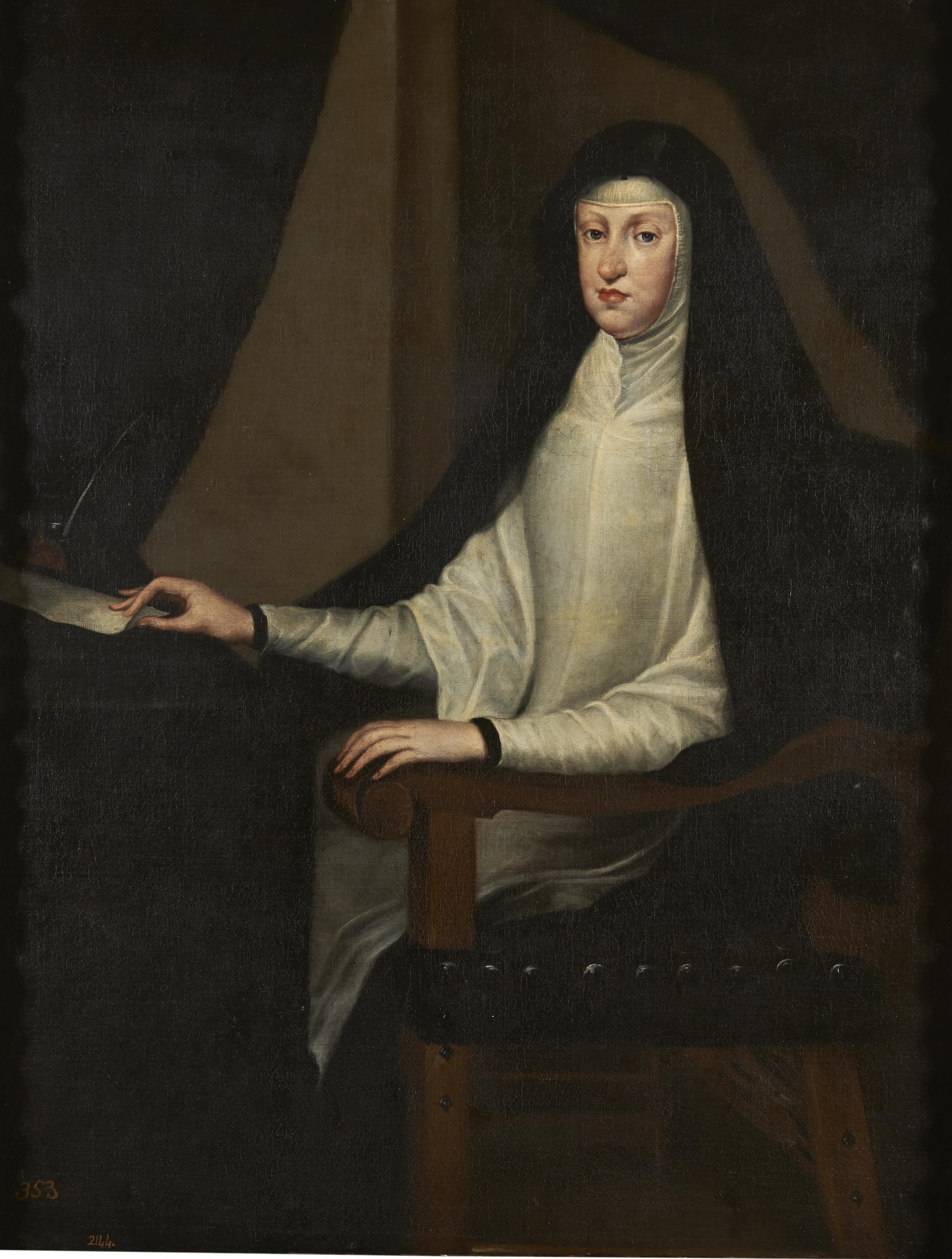
Portrait of Spanish consort queen Mariana de Austria

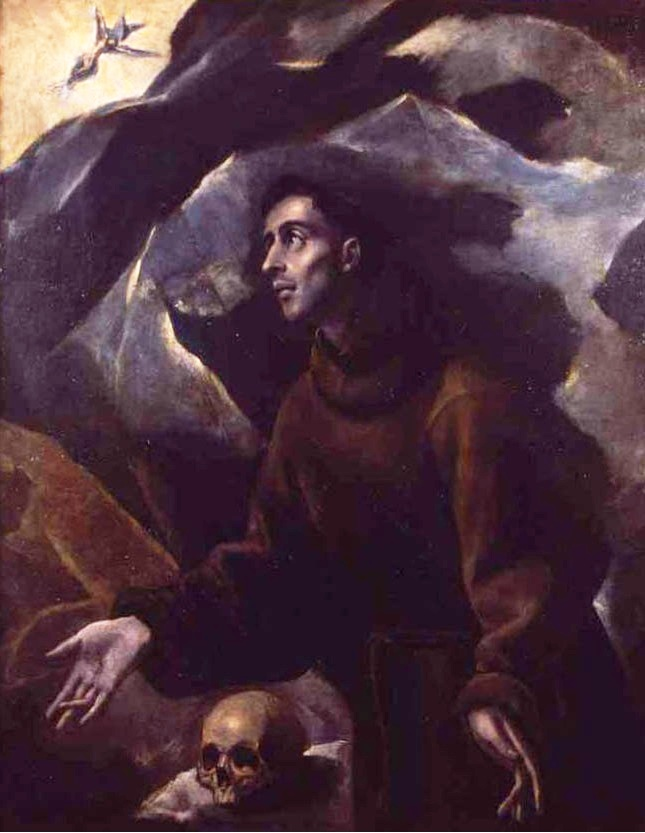
17th century canvas displayed in the museum's art gallery

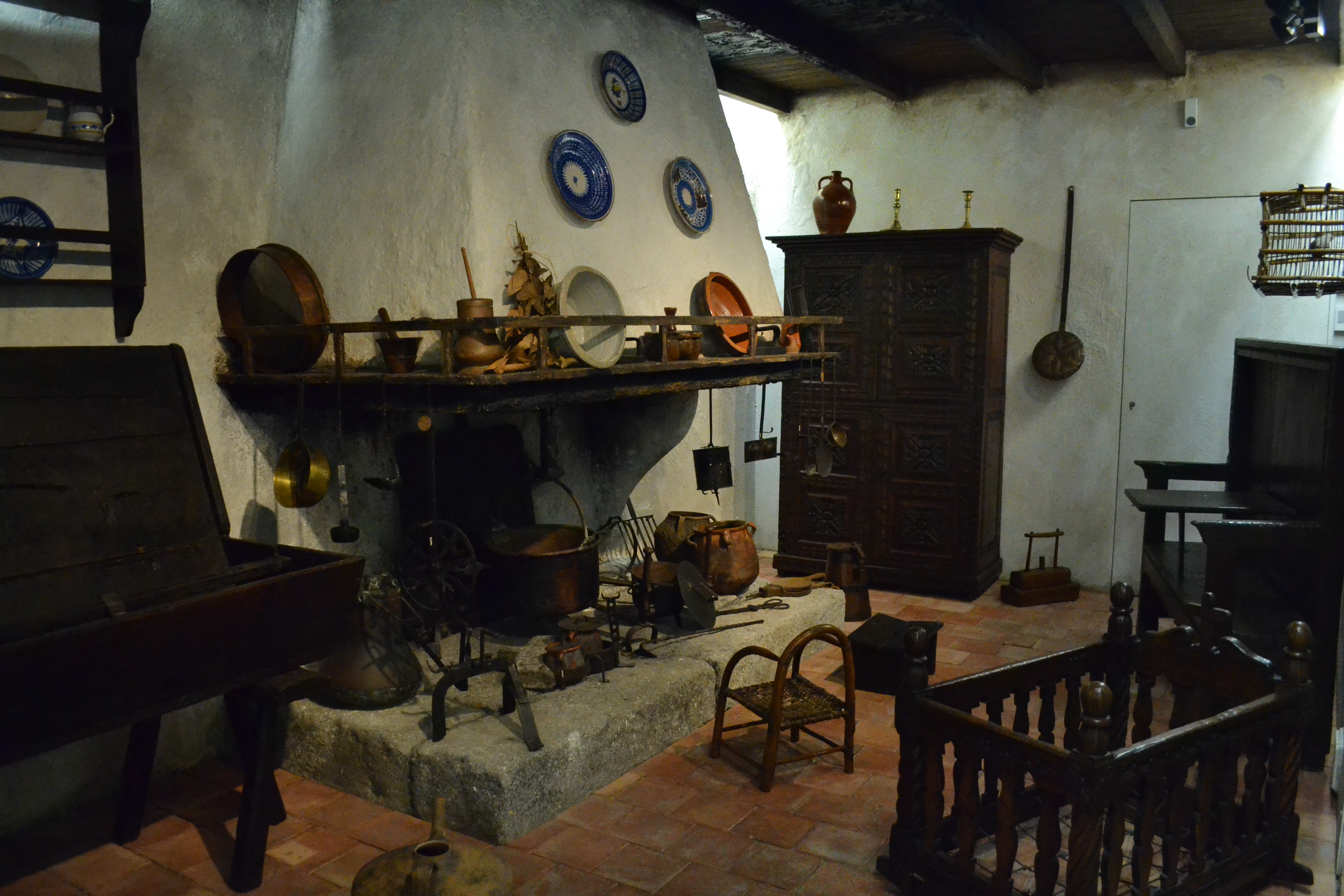
Old Basque kitchen recreation

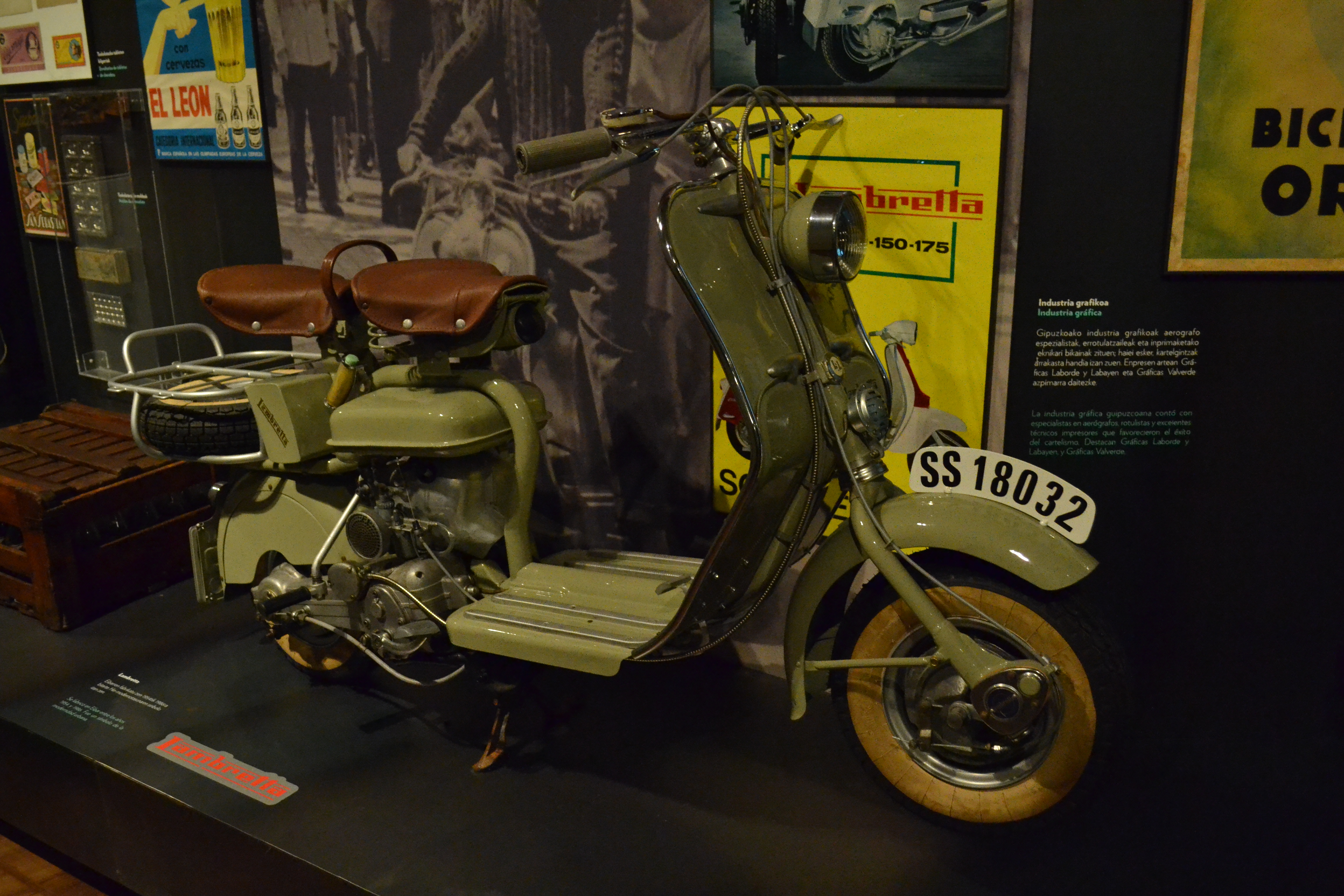
Motorcycle in the section Awakening to modernity

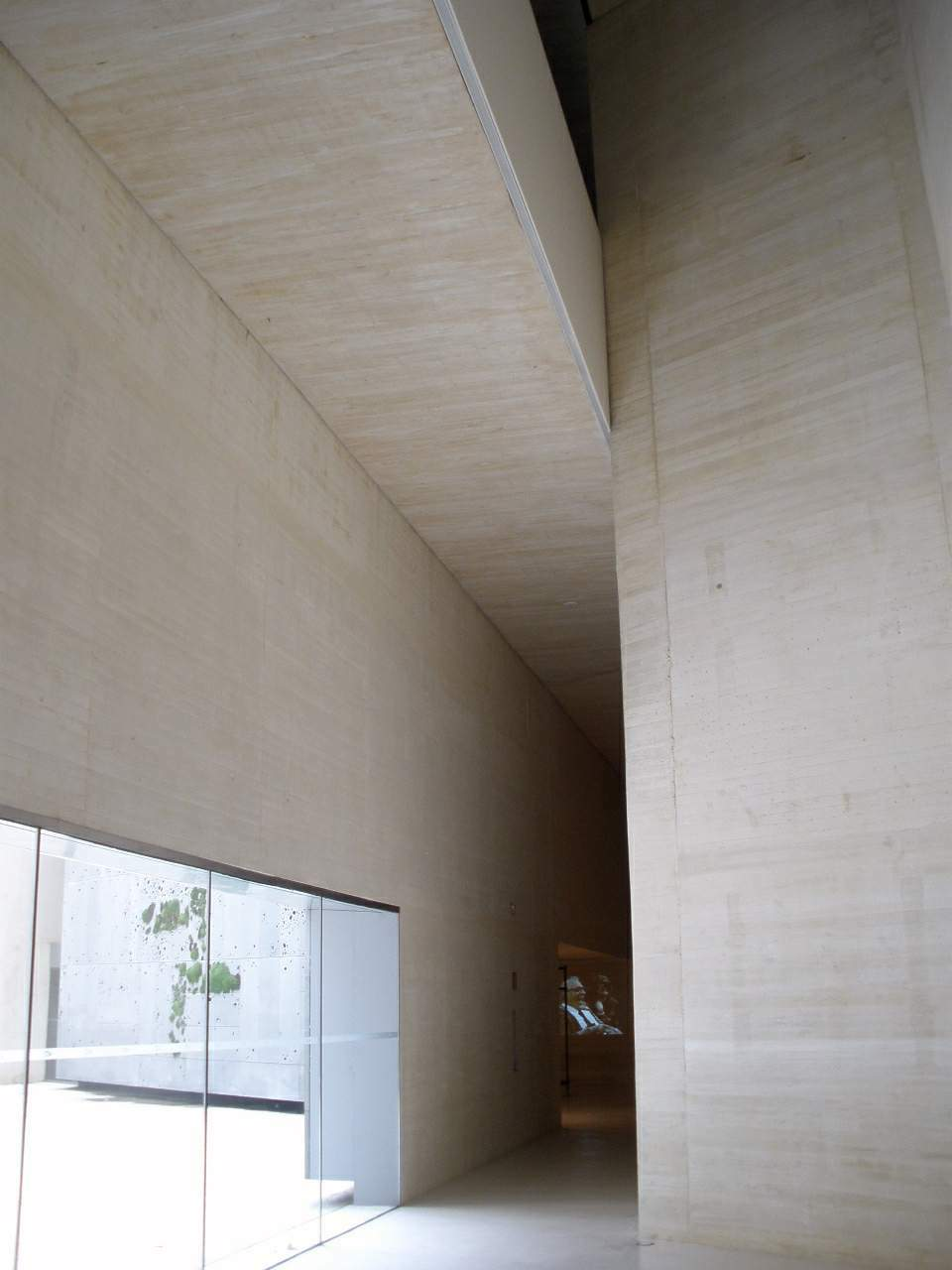
Hallway by the entrance with the extension's signature exposed cement walls

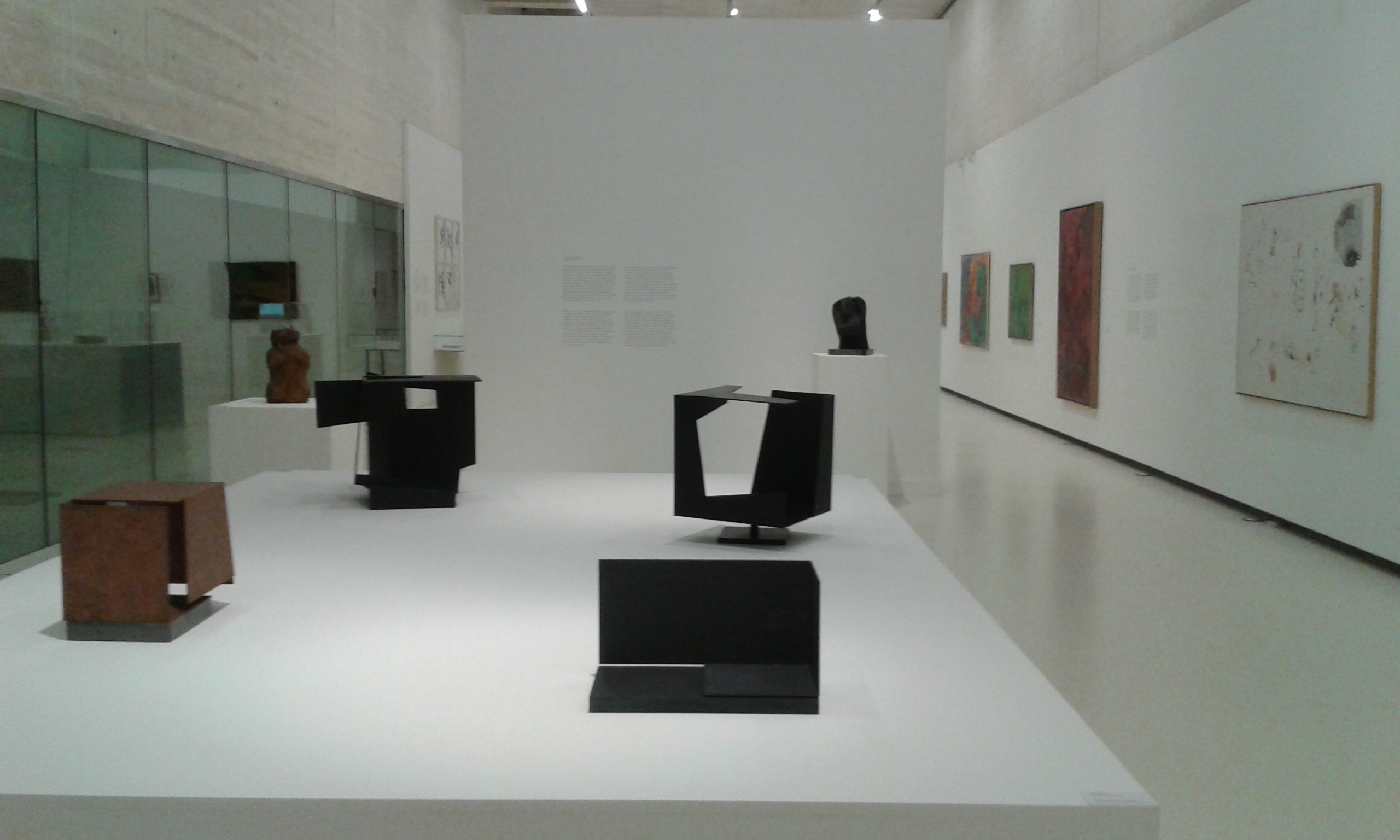
View of Gaur konstelazioak temporary exhibition held in 2015

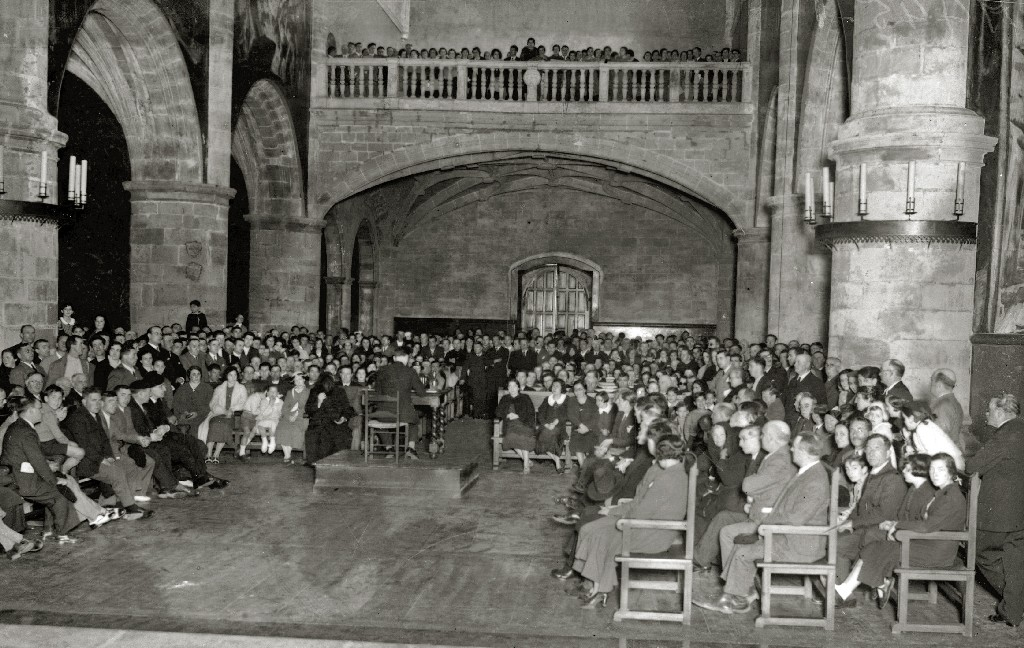
Antonio Mari Labaien's conference in the central nave of the church (1935)

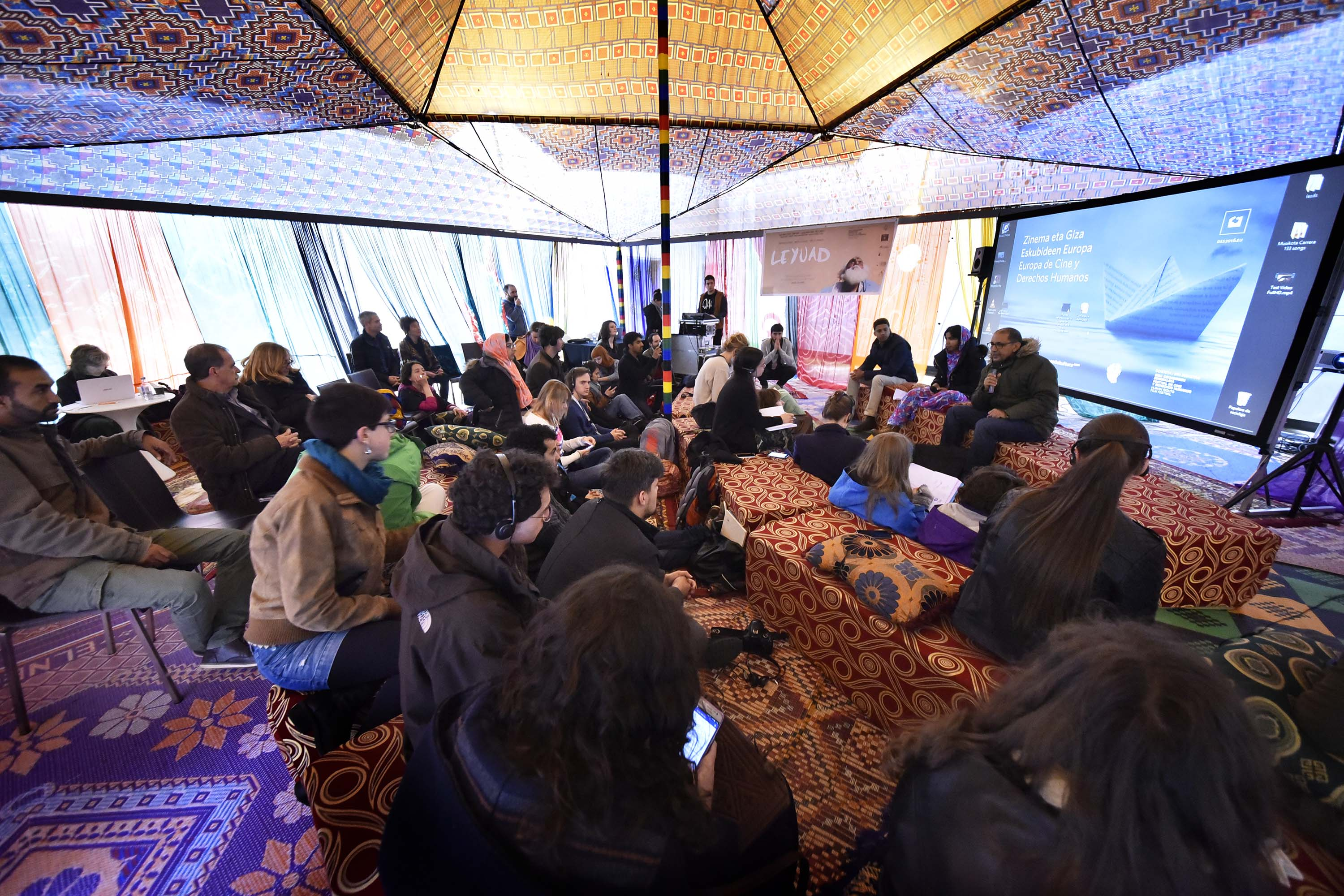
Side activity in the exhibition Entre arenas / Hondar artean
