= De conscribendis epistolis =

1534 book by Juan Luis Vives

On the Writing of Letters (Latin: De conscribendis epistolis) was a popular Early Modern guide to the art of letter writing by Spanish humanist Juan Luis Vives. First published in 1534 in conjunction with Desiderius Erasmus' treatise of the same name, Vives's work attempts to teach letter writers how to engage a variety of audiences.

== Background ==
In 1533, Vives wrote De conscribendis epistolis for Alonso Idiáquez, secretary to King Charles I of Spain. On the surface, Vives sought to help Idiáquez avoid what Vives saw as a popular misunderstanding of how successful letters should be written. Because this work was also published, it seems safe to assume Vives wanted to rectify the dictamen on a large scale. Since the early days of the Roman Empire, letter writers had attempted to apply the principles of oratory wholesale to epistolary composition. This approach remained popular well into the Renaissance. The result was a society of writers who did not observe practical decorum in their letters. Vives warns that it is easy for a writer to slip into "... impudence or arrogance or loquacity or ostentation or cunning or pedantic affectation or excessive and parasitical flattery or ignorance or imprudence."

The current authority on De conscribendis epistolis, Charles Fantazzi traces this epistolary renaissance to the rediscovery of Cicero’s letters to Atticus, Quintus Cicero, and Brutus. In 1345, these letters were found by Petrarch in the Chapter Library of Verona. Vives frequently cites Cicero as a prime example of a writer who tailored his letters according to the epistolary occasion.

== Synopsis ==
Vives begins by telling “Señor Idiáquez” to always consider the rhetorical situation for the letter, primarily evaluating the relationship of the writer to the recipient. The reason is that, as Saint Ambrose told Sabinus, "In a letter the image of the living presence emits its glow between persons distant from each other, and conversation committed to writing unites those who are separated from each other."

Thus, it is not a speech delivered by an orator in a crowded assembly. Rather, it is a conversation. Vives then gives a history lesson on the letter in an attempt to show that the best letter writers of antiquity understood this conversational aspect of the letter.

Vives states that the exordium of the letter is both the hardest to write and the most important part of the letter. It will color the reader's reaction throughout the body of the letter. It is important to tailor this section to the recipient:

To a prosperous, haughty person the letter must be more respectful, but without flattery; to one who is stern and disagreeable, use a more mild and reserved style, to one who is unsophisticated or dull-witted, a more lucid style is called for; to a clever person, the style must be more studied and ornate, if he takes pleasure in that and regards it as an expression of respect …

Vives also gives instructions on how to vary the letter's style according to genre. He covers letters of petition, instruction, congratulations, consolation, incentive, and shared interests. “We may write on every subject,” says Vives, but he focuses his attention on the most popular epistolary genres. Following the pattern Vives sets out in his discussion of the exordium, the bulk of De conscribendis epistolis covers the components of the letter and considerations for composition such as diction and addresses on superscriptions. Throughout this how-to section of the treatise, Vives offers examples and templates, which are “suitable for our use” in the 1530s, as he puts it.
