= Battle of Cape St. Vincent (1641) =

1641 naval battle of the Eighty Years' War

Coordinates: 37.0250°N 8.9944°W

- Part of the Eighty Years' War
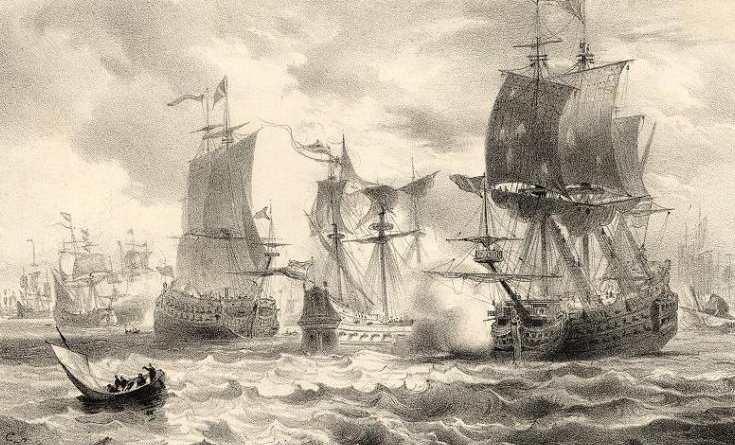
- Battle of Cape St. Vincent, by Carel Christiaan Antony Last
Date	4 November 1641
Location	Near Cape St. Vincent, Portugal
Result	Inconclusive

Belligerents
Dutch Republic	Spain

Commanders and leaders
(Dutch Republic) Artus Gijsels	(Spain) Juan Alonso Idiáquez

Strength
20 warships	Total: 24 warships 9 Galleons; 10 Dunkirk Men-of-war; 4 frigates 1 Caravel

Casualties and losses
100–200 killed or wounded, 2 ships sunk	1,100 killed or wounded, 2 ships sunk

The Battle of Cape St Vincent of 1641 took place on 4 November 1641 when a Spanish fleet commanded by Don Juan Alonso de Idiáquez y Robles intercepted a Dutch fleet led by Artus Gijsels during the Eighty Years' War. After a fierce battle two Dutch ships were lost but the Dutch claimed only a hundred of their men were killed; the Spanish fleet also lost two ships but over a thousand dead. The damaged Dutch fleet was forced to abandon its planned attack on the Spanish treasure fleet.

== Background ==
In 1641, after the outbreak of the Portuguese Restoration War, the Portuguese government, with Dutch and French help, prepared to start the offensive against Spain at sea. Dom António Telles da Silva, who had fought the Dutch in India, was designated commander of a squadron of 16 ships, which along with another 30 of the Dutch Republic under Artus Gijsels, was entrusted with the mission to capture and hold the Spanish towns of Cádiz and Sanlúcar. The attempts failed thanks to the fortuitous encounter that they had with 5 Dunkirkers under Judocus Peeters, who was chasing a flotilla of Algerian privateers, off Cape St. Vincent. Peeters managed to reach Cádiz without losing a single vessel and put on alert the Marquis of Ayamonte and Don Gaspar Alfonso Pérez de Guzmán, 9th Duke of Medina Sidonia.

Gijsels and Telles returned to Lisbon, where Telles was replaced by Tristão de Mendonça, former Ambassador to the Dutch Republic. The Portuguese fleet then sailed with the French fleet of the Marquis de Brézé, while the Dutch fleet set sail in order to intercept and capture the Spanish West Indies Fleet between the Azores and Cape St. Vincent. It was a hasty maneuver, since the Dutch ships had orders to return to their country if the West Indies Fleet didn't appear before November.

== Battle ==
The Spanish squadron of Galicia, under Don Andrés de Castro, the squadron of Naples, under Don Martín Carlos de Mencos, and the galleons of Don Pedro de Ursúa, were urgently gathered in Cádiz to intercept the Dutch fleet. The military governor of Cádiz, Don Juan Alonso de Idiáquez y Robles, Duke of Ciudad Real, was appointed commander of the fleet in substitution of the Captain General, the Duke of Maqueda, who was ill. He was a veteran soldier, having seen action in the Siege of Leucata against the French, but was inexperienced in sea battles.

Gijsels fleet was sighted off Cape St. Vincent on 4 November. The Duke of Ciudad Real immediately ordered to attack the major Dutch vessels. After suffering severe casualties he stopped the attack and the ships to fall back to Cádiz. This conduct dissatisfied King Philip IV, who severely reprimanded, among other officers, Don Martín Carlos de Mencos, Admiral Don Pedro de Ursúa, and Captains Pedro Girón, Gaspar de Campos, and Adrián Pulido.

Michiel de Ruyter was present at this battle as Rear Admiral of the Dutch fleet.

== Aftermath ==
Some of the Dutch ships under Artus Gijsels, abandoned by their Portuguese and French allies, had to sail back to England to make repairs.

== See also ==
- Battle of Cape St. Vincent (1606)

== Bibliography ==
- Cesáreo Fernández Duro: Armada española desde la unión de los reinos de Castilla y de León, Vol. IV. Est. tipográfico Sucesores de Rivadeneyra, Madrid, 1898.
- Antonio Espinosa: Semanario erudito: que comprehende varias obras ineditas de nuestros mejores autores antiguos y modernos. Don Antonio Espinosa, 1790.
- Agustín Ramón Rodríguez González: Victorias por mar de los Españoles, Biblioteca de Historia, Madrid 2006.
- R. Prud’homme van Reine, Rechterhand van Nederland. Biografie van Michiel Adriaenszoon de Ruyter, (Amsterdam 1996)
- Blok, P.J. (1928). Michiel de Ruyter (PDF) (in Dutch). Martinus Nijhof.
