= Andrés Avelino de Salabert y Arteaga =

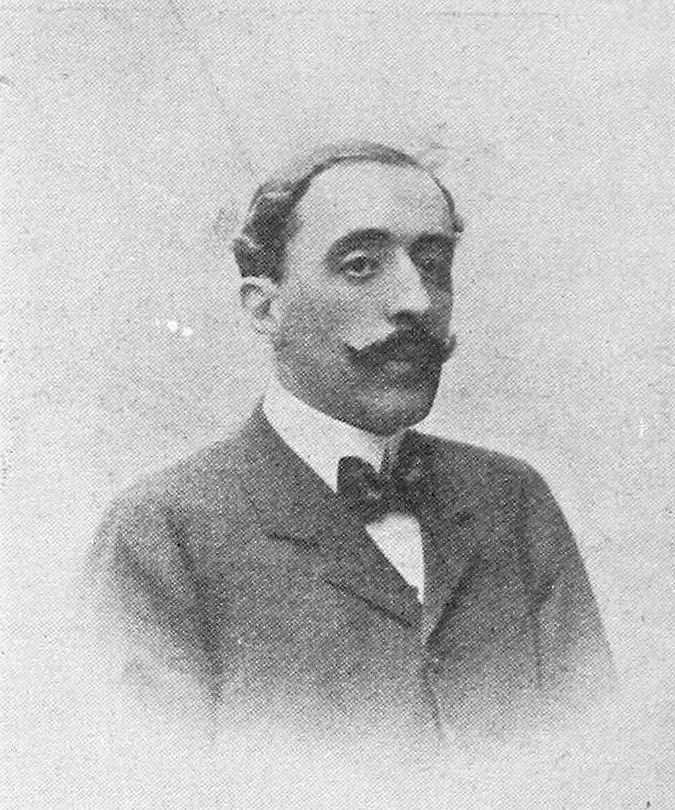
Picture of the Marqués de la Torrecilla, by Christian Franzen.

Andrés Avelino de Salabert y Arteaga (Madrid, 18 October 1864 – Madrid, 10 March 1925), 10th Duke of Ciudad Real, 8th Marquis of la Torrecilla, 11th Count of Aramayona, 9th Marquess of Navahermosa, 9th Viscount of Linares, was a Grandee of Spain, senator and Mayordomo mayor of the Palace of King Alfonso XIII of Spain.

== Biography ==
He was a son of Narciso de Salabert y Pinedo, Marquis of la Torrecilla, and Josefa de Arteaga y Silva, sister of the 16th Duke of Infantado, from a family of Aragonese and Basque origin. His father went into exile in Paris after the Revolution of 1868. Andrés received his early education there. His father died in 1885, and he succeeded him in all his titles, reinstating the Dukedom of Ciudad Real in his favor three years later. In 1901, he became a senator in his own right. Like his father, he represented Ávila in the Cortes for the Conservative Party

He restored Butrón Castle in the Basque Country, continuing his father's work.

In 1909, upon the death of the Duke of Sotomayor, Mayordomo mayor of the Palace, the 9th Duke of Sotomayor, Alfonso XIII elected him as his successor, a position he held for almost twenty years. He was also the King's Sumiller de Corps.

Among his closest relatives were other royal servants, such as the 1st Duke of Santo Mauro, his brother-in-law and Chief Steward to the Queen. He received the Order of the Golden Fleece in 1911.
He died single and without succession, his titles being inherited by his sister Casilda Remigia, the widow of the 16th Duke of Medinaceli.
