= Jorge Arturo Reina Idiáquez =

Honduran politician

Jorge Arturo Reina Idiáquez (born 21 March 1935) is a Honduran politician and diplomat. He is the brother of former President Carlos Roberto Reina.

Reina was born in Tegucigalpa and was educated at the University of El Salvador, the National Autonomous University of Mexico, and the National Autonomous University of Honduras. He was an academic and was the dean of the National Autonomous University of Honduras between 1973 and 1979.

In 1990, Reina was elected to the National Congress of Honduras. He became speaker of the Liberal Party in Congress and served four consecutive terms as a member of Parliament, leaving in 2006. He served as Interior Minister from 2006 to 2007.

In 2008, Reina became the Permanent Representative of Honduras to the United Nations in New York City.

In July 2009, after receiving notice from the government of interim Honduran President Roberto Micheletti that he was fired, Reina stated that he did not recognise the legitimacy of Micheletti's government, which was installed during the 2009 Honduran constitutional crisis.
