= Alonso de Idiáquez y Yurramendi =

Spanish nobleman and politician

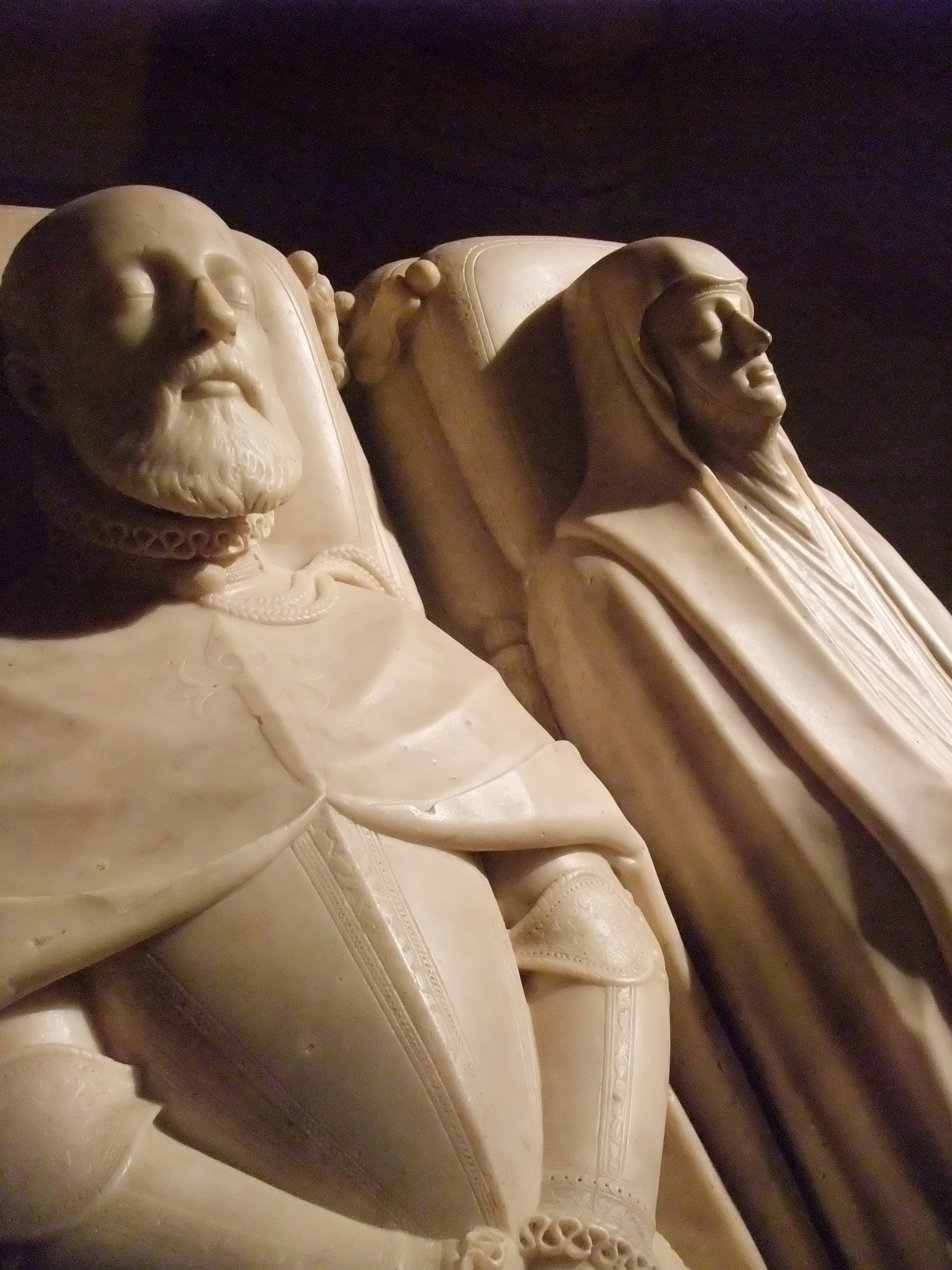
- Tomb effigies of Alonso and his wife Gracia in the San Telmo Museoa in San Sebastián, formerly a Dominican friary

Personal details
- Born: c. 1497; Tolosa, Gipuzkoa, Spain
- Died: 8 June 1547 (aged about 50); Torgau, Saxony, Germany

Alonso de Idiáquez y Yurramendi (Basque: Alfontso Idiakez; c. 1497 – 8 June 1547) was a Spanish nobleman and politician.

== Early life ==
He was born in Tolosa, in the Basque province of Gipuzkoa. His parents were Juan de Idiáquez and Catalina de Yurramendi.

== Career ==
Idiáquez began his career working for Francisco de los Cobos, and became royal secretary to Charles I of Spain. He was a knight of the orders of Alcántara, Calatrava and Santiago.

Idiáquez was the dedicatee of a book on letter-writing, De conscribendis epistolis published in the 1530s. He met the author, Juan Luis Vives, in the Habsburg Netherlands. Vives begins by telling “Señor Idiáquez” to always consider the rhetorical situation for the letter, primarily evaluating the relationship of the writer to the recipient.

He may have commissioned the illuminated manuscript known as the Munich-Montserrat Book of Hours, which was the work of the Flemish miniaturist Simon Bening. The manuscript is known to have been in the possession of a Dominican friary in San Sebastian associated with Idiaquez.

== Death and legacy ==
He met a violent death by the Elbe River in Torgau, Germany, at the hands of Protestants. His body was taken to San Sebastián for burial in the tomb that, along with his wife Gracia de Olazábal, he had built in the monastery of San Telmo, where they both currently lie.

His son Juan de Idiáquez y Olazábal also entered the service of the king. His grandson Alonso de Idiáquez Butrón y Múgica was the 1st Duke of Ciudad Real.
