= Juan de Idiáquez y Olazábal =

Spanish statesman (1540–1614)

Personal details
- Born: 12 March 1540 Madrid, Spain
- Died: 12 October 1614 (aged 73) Segovia, Spain
- Spouse: Mencía Manrique de Butrón
- Children: Alonso de Idiáquez Butrón y Múgica
- Parent(s): Alonso de Idiáquez y Yurramendi; Gracia de Olazábal

Juan de Idiáquez y Olazábal (12 March 1540 – 12 October 1614) was a Spanish statesman. He held many positions, including menin of Prince Carlos, ambassador to Genoa and Venice, royal secretary and adviser to Philip II and president of the Council of Orders with Philip III. He was also a member of the Order of Santiago.

== Family background ==
Born in Madrid, he was the only son of Alonso de Idiáquez y Yurramendi, who was secretary of Charles I of Spain, and Gracia de Olazábal. Due to his father's occupation, Juan de Idiáquez y Olazábal spent his early childhood in and around the Spanish court.

== Career ==
At a young age, Idiáquez was appointed commander of Villaescusa de Haro, of the Order of Santiago.

=== Menin ===
As a menin, he entered the service of Carlos, Prince of Asturias, the eldest son of King Philip II.

=== Ambassador to Genoa and Venice ===
Idiáquez lived in San Sebastián until 1573, when Philip II called him to Genoa to settle civil disputes. He was appointed ambassador on 26 August 1573. From 1575-76, Genoa was involved in civil war. The conflict was settled in 1576 with the implementation of 61 civil laws and 24 criminal laws ordered by Idiáquez, Cardinal Juan Morón and Duke of Gandía Carlos de Borja. He left the position in 1578, and in November that year was appointed ambassador to Venice. Whilst holding this position, he was awarded the "encomienda de Penausende (Zamora), de la Orden."

=== Relations with Ireland ===
In 1593, Idiáquez met with James O'Hely, the Irish Catholic Archbishop of Tuam. O'Hely had been sent to Spain to urgently obtain 8,000 to 10,000 Spanish soldiers, to supplement Irish forces in their conflict against the Tudors. The archbishop emphasised to Idiáquez the persecution the Irish were suffering as fellow Catholics. Idiáquez wrote to King Philip II, and described his meeting with O'Hely:

"The Irish archbishop of Tuam says that it will be of great importance for the success of the confederacy of Irish Catholics, that Your Majesty should write very affectionately to the earl of Tyrone, whose name is O’Neill to induce him to enter into the confederacy openly. He already belongs to it secretly, and he should be assured that Your Majesty’s aid shall not fail them. The archbishop begs Your Majesty to order a letter to be written to the earl to that effect."

— Idiáquez, in a note to Philip II

Philip II thought these demands were heavy, but ultimately felt pity for the plight of Irish Catholics. Idiáquez was instructed to give the Irish "the very smallest aid that will be needed. If it be so small that we can give it, we will help them." Idiáquez arranged for a ship to take O'Hely and some Spaniards back to Ireland on a preliminary expedition, but in 1594, the ship was shipwrecked in a sandbar on the coast of Santander, and the crew died.

== Personal life ==
On 4 February 1563, Idiáquez married Mencía Manrique de Mújica in Bermeo, Biscay. The couple had only a son, Alonso, born February 1565 in San Sebastián. He became the 1st Duke of Ciudad Real and viceroy of Navarre.

In August 1565, Mencía died in childbirth, and in 1614 Juan de Idiáquez y Olazábal died in Segovia.

Preceded by Antonio Pérez; Gabriel de Zayas	Secretary of State; 1579 - 1587	Succeeded by Martín de Idiáquez e Isasi; Francisco de Idiáquez
Preceded by Martín de Córdoba y Velasco	President of the Council of Orders; 12 November 1599 - 12 October 1614	Succeeded by Luis Carrillo de Toledo
