= Martín de Idiáquez y Camarena =

17th-century Flemish-Spanish military leader

Martín de Idiáquez y Camarena (born 1594) was a Flemish-Spanish military leader and mercenary who fought with several tercios for Hapsburg Spain across multiple European territories. He was knighted in the Order of Santiago. Idiáquez' heroic leadership of his own tercio was credited by Cardinal-Infante Ferdinand for Spain's victory at the Battle of Nordlingen in 1634.

== Early life ==
Idiáquez was born in Dendermonde, East Flanders, Belgium, the son of Domingo de Idiáquez, a native of Gipuzkoa, Spain and Magdalena de Camarena, who was of Calabria, Spain. His father was a governor of Flanders. His brothers were Cristóbal, a superintendent of the Royal Navy of Cantabria, and Diego, a captain of cavalry in Flanders.

== Career ==
In 1614, Idiáquez began a military career as a mercenary under Philibert of Savoy in the war against Turkey. While serving as an arquebusier under Captain Bartolomé Bermúdez de Castro, Idiáquez was shot in the chest. He then served under Field Marshal Gonzalo Fernández de Córdoba. Idiaquez fought in several battles in 1616. During the siege of Vercelli, he was promoted to lead fifty pikemen. Despite being wounded in the arm, Idiáquez distinguished himself in the capture of the city and was granted command of a Spanish infantry company by Pedro de Toledo Osorio, 5th Marquess of Villafranca, Governor of Milan.

Idiáquez was knighted in the Order of Santiago on January 21, 1621.

=== Battle of Nordlingen ===
In 1634, Idiaquez departed Milan as a commander in the army of Cardinal-Infante Ferdinand in an offensive against the Swedish-German army in Bavaria. He commanded a Spanish tercio formed from companies stationed in Naples and Lombardy. The tercio of Idiáquez was composed of twenty-six banners and eighteen hundred men. On September 5, 1634, Idiáquez' tercio and two German regiments defended the strategic hill of Albuch. A Swedish calvary attack forced the Germans to retreat, but Idiáquez' tercio prevented a rout of the defenders at Albuch by planting pikemen against a charging Swedish infantry. Then Idiáquez led a counter-attack that left the Swedish forces in disarray. In a span of six hours, Swedish companies launched fifteen successive attacks against the tercio of Idiáquez and were repulsed each time. The stand-off eventually led to the exhaustion of the Swedish forces and their defeat. In the official report of the victory at Nordlingen, Cardinal-Infante Ferdinand stated that "...Don Martín de Idiáquez deserves much of the credit for this success...."

On October 12 1634, King Philip IV of Spain awarded Idiáquez a pension of 1,000 ducats and an embrace.
