= Donostia/San Sebastián 2016 =

Series of cultural events

Donostia/San Sebastian 2016 European Capital of Culture
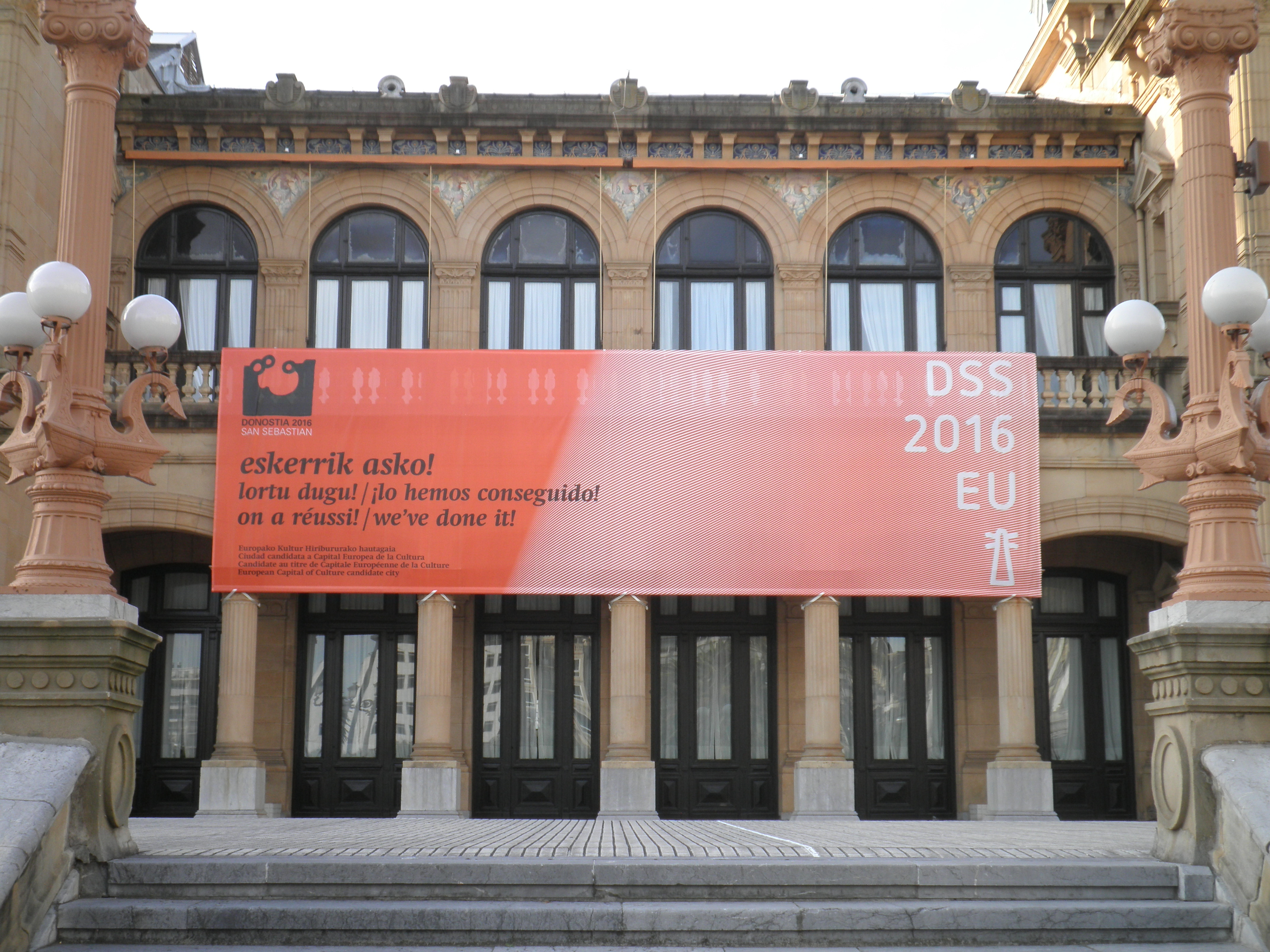
- Donostia/San Sebastian, European Capital of Culture 2016
- Date: January 18 to December 31, 2016
- Location: Donostia/San Sebastian
- Organised by: Donostia 2016 Foundation
- Website: dss2016.eu

Donostia/San Sebastian 2016 or DSS2016 was the year-long series of cultural events that took place in Donostia-San Sebastian, Gipuzkoa and the surrounding area to celebrate the territory's designation as the European Capital of Culture for 2016. The project was proposed by Odón Elorza, former mayor of the city, in 2008. Although all the political parties with elected representation have supported the project, included the so-called abertzale left throughout its political tenure in the town in spite of its initial discrepancies with the scope of the project, opposition to the project has emerged related to the capitalist point of view of the project.
