= Alonso de Idiáquez Butrón y Múgica =

Spanish nobleman, soldier and councillor

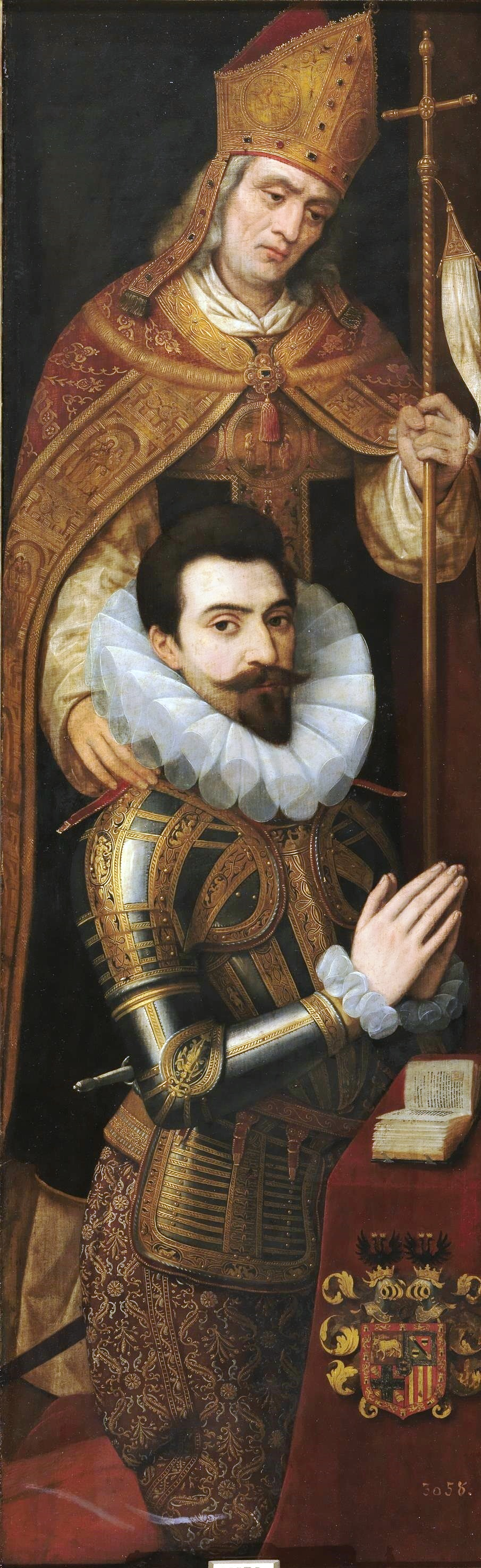
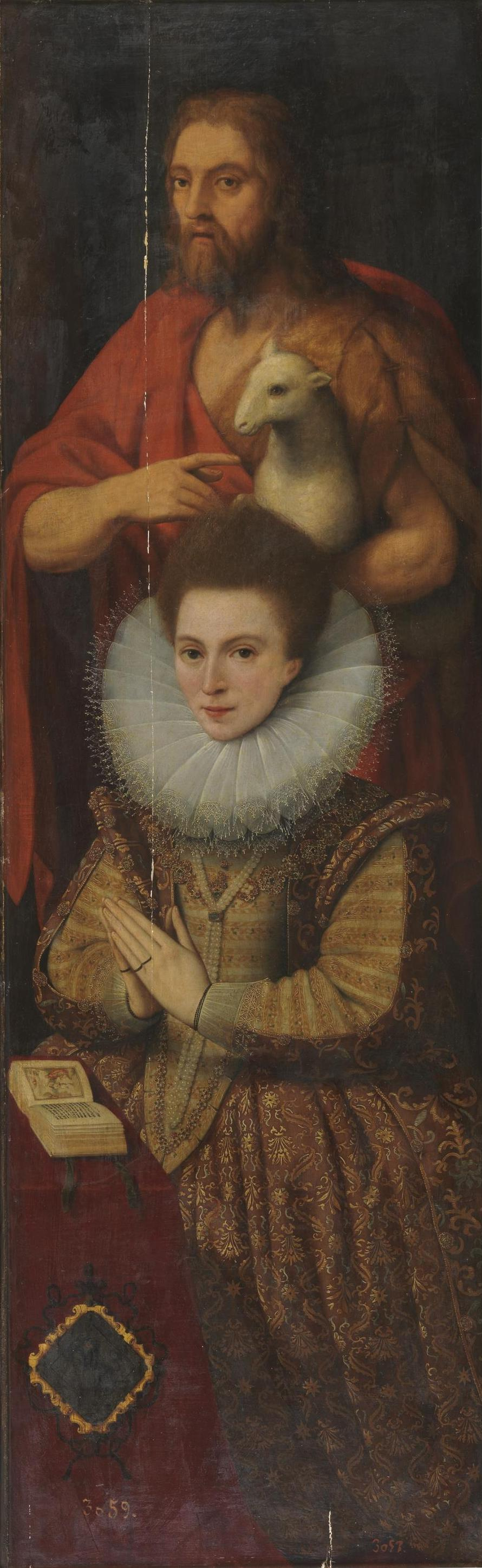
Otto van Veen, Retrato de los duques de Ciudad Real (1589). Oil on wood. Museo del Prado.

Alonso de Idiáquez Butrón y Múgica (14 February 1565 – 27 September 1618) was a Spanish nobleman, soldier and councillor. The first Duke of Ciudad Real, he served as the viceroy of Navarre and captain-general of Gipuzkoa from 1610 until his death.

Born in San Sebastián, Alonso was the only son and heir of Juan de Idiáquez y Olazábal and Mencía Manrique Butrón y Múgica. He took part in the conquest of the Azores in 1583. With a royal dispensation from Philip II, he joined the Order of Santiago as a knight in November 1583 and was appointed comendador of Vitoria. In 1585, he accompanied Philip II's daughter, Catalina, to the Duchy of Savoy for her marriage to Charles Emmanuel I.

Beginning in 1586, Alonso fought under Alessandro Farnese against the Dutch Revolt. He was one of hundreds of young Spanish noblemen who flocked to Flanders in hopes of participating in an invasion of England. He at one point rejected a promotion to captain of cavalry, preferring to remain a captain of harquebusiers. In 1588, he was with the disastrous Invincible Armada. Later that year, he was wounded at the siege of Bergen op Zoom. In 1590, he was named to the Consejo de Guerra. Sometime later, he was also named as secretary of state.

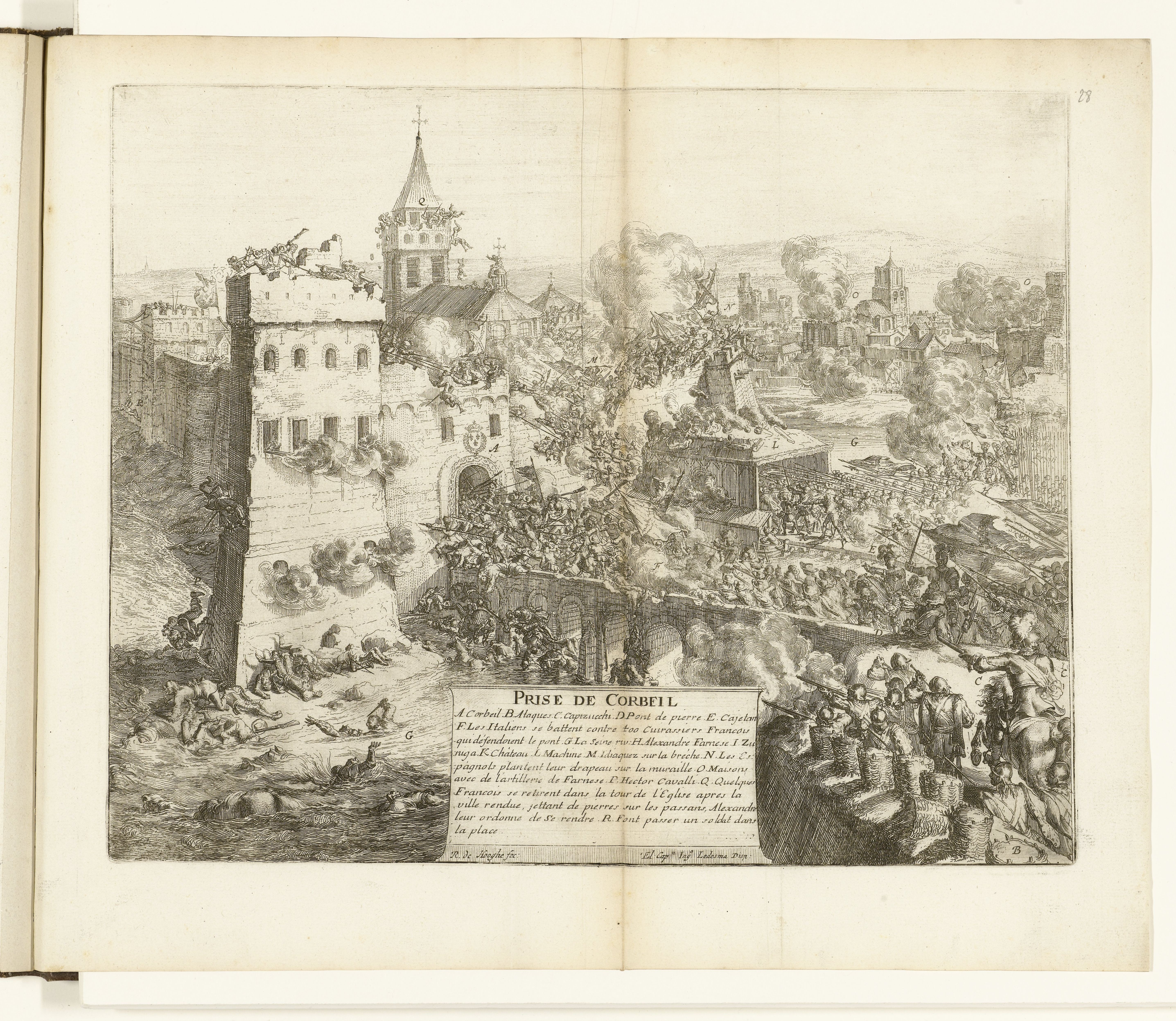
Romeyn de Hooghe, Prise de Corbeil (1670×1699). Etching. Rijksmuseum.

In 1589, Alonso married Juana, daughter of Gaspar de Robles, in Flanders. They had one son, Juan Alonso de Idiáquez y Robles, born in 1597.

Between 1590 and 1593, Alonso took part in the Spanish intervention in the French Wars of Religion. He was wounded at the capture of Corbeil in 1590. In 1592, he was named comendador of Villoria for the Order of Santiago. In 1593, he was promoted to the rank of general of cavalry. In 1595, he was captured at the battle of Fontaine-Française, but was quickly ransomed for 20,000 escudos.

On 7 December 1606, Alonso was named Count of Aramayona in . Shortly afterwards, he was named Count of Biandrina and Barrica in the Duchy of Milan. In 1610, he was appointed viceroy and captain-general of Navarre and captain-general of Gipuzkoa. On 12 December 1613, he was named Duke of Ciudad Real, entailing a fief at Cittareale in the Kingdom of Naples. On the death of his father in 1614, he inherited the prebostazgo of Bilbao. He was also confirmed as comendador mayor of León in succession to his father in 1617. He died the following year in Milan, where he was serving as maestre de campo and castellan. He was succeeded in most of his titles by his son.
