= Victoria von Hohenlohe-Langenburg =

Spanish noblewoman

Princess Victoria
- Duchess of Medinaceli

Duchess of Medinaceli
- Reign: 19 August 2016 –
- Predecessor: Prince Marco of Hohenlohe-Langenburg
- Born: Victoria Elisabeth von Hohenlohe-Langenburg; 17 March 1997 (age 29); Málaga, Spain
- Spouse: Maxime Corneille Iribarren (m. 2023)
- House: Hohenlohe-Langenburg (agnatic); Medinaceli (cognatic)
- Father: Prince Marco of Hohenlohe-Langenburg
- Mother: Sandra Schmidt-Polex

Princess Victoria Elisabeth of Hohenlohe-Langenburg, 20th Duchess of Medinaceli, GE (born 17 March 1997) is a Spanish noblewoman. Holding 43 officially recognised titles in the Spanish nobility, she is the most titled aristocrat in the world, as well as 10 times a Grandee of Spain.

Patrilineally a member of the House of Hohenlohe, she is the elder child of Prince Marco of Hohenlohe-Langenburg, 19th Duke of Medinaceli. Her younger brother, Prince Alexander Gonzalo of Hohenlohe-Langenburg, is the 14th Duke of Ciudad Real, 13th Marquess of Navahermosa, and a dynast of the Princely House of Hohenlohe-Langenburg.

== Biography ==
She was born in Málaga on 17 March 1997, the first child of Prince Marco of Hohenlohe-Langenburg, a German-Spanish aristocrat, and his former wife Sandra Schmidt-Polex, whose family belonged to a wealthy Frankfurt banking and industrial dynasty that rose to prominence in the 19th century, played an influential role in financial and corporate circles, and was closely connected by marriage to other prominent Frankfurt business families—such as the Andreae, de Bary, and Bansa—as well as to several families of the German nobility. Victoria is trilingual and was raised in Munich, Germany, prior to moving to Madrid to study international relations at IE University.

Her paternal grandmother was Ana Luisa de Medina, Marchioness of Navahermosa, Countess of Ofalia, who died in 2012. Victoria inherited her grandmother's countship in 2016, while her brother inherited the other title.

Upon the death in 2016 of her father (head of the Medinaceli family since 2014), she became the heir to about 40 titles of nobility related to the House of Medinaceli. From 2017, she has been confirmed by the Spanish Ministry of Justice as the holder of 5 dukedoms, 16 marquessates, 17 countships (with one adelantazgo) and 4 viscountcies. With 43 titles, she is the most titled aristocrat in Spain and the world. She holds 10 grandeeships.

== Marriage ==
She got engaged in May 2023 to her boyfriend Maxime Corneille Iribarren, an Argentinian who is of French and Spanish descent amongst others. Their wedding took place on 14 October 2023 at the Church of San Miguel (Jerez de la Frontera).

== Titles and arms ==
Ducal arms of Medinaceli

=== Titles ===
==== Dukedoms ====
- 20th Duchess of Medinaceli, with Grandeeship
- 17th Duchess of Alcalá de los Gazules, with Grandeeship
- 15th Duchess of Camiña, with Grandeeship
- 5th Duchess of Denia, with Grandeeship
- 5th Duchess of Tarifa, with Grandeeship

==== Marquessates ====
- 15th Marchioness of Aytona, with Grandeeship
- 18th Marchioness of Camarasa, with Grandeeship
- 12th Marchioness of la Torrecilla, with Grandeeship
- 18th Marchioness of Priego, with Grandeeship
- 15th Marchioness of Cilleruelo
- 10th Marchioness of San Miguel das Penas y la Mota
- 15th Marchioness of Alcalá de la Alameda
- 17th Marchioness of Comares
- 20th Marchioness of Denia
- 18th Marchioness of las Navas
- 15th Marchioness of Malagón
- 16th Marchioness of Montalbán
- 20th Marchioness of Tarifa
- 16th Marchioness of Villafranca
- 13th Marchioness of Vila Real

==== Countships ====
- 19th Countess of Santa Gadea, with Grandeeship
- 11th Countess of Ofalia
- 5th Countess of San Martín de Hoyos
- 20th Countess of Alcoutim
- 16th Countess of Amarante
- 13th Countess of Castrogeriz
- 23rd Countess of Ossona
- 26th Countess of Prades
- 20th Countess del Risco
- 14th Countess of Aramayona
- 25th Countess of Buendía
- 20th Countess of Castellar
- 21st Countess of Cocentaina
- 20th Countess of Medellín
- 21st Countess of los Molares, and Adelantada mayor of Andalusia
- 14th Countess of Moriana del Río
- 18th Countess of Valenza y Valladares
- 15th Countess of Villalonso

==== Viscountcies ====
- 47th Viscountess of Bas
- 45th Viscountess of Cabrera
- 13th Viscountess of Linares
- 43rd Viscountess of Villamur

== Ancestry ==
Ancestors of Victoria von Hohenlohe-Langenburg

16. Prince Gottfried of Hohenlohe-Langenburg
8. Prince Max Egon of Hohenlohe-Langenburg
17. Countess Ana of Schönborn-Buchheim
4. Prince Max of Hohenlohe-Langenburg
18. Manuel Adrián de Yturbe y del Villar
9. María de la Piedad de Yturbe, 3rd Marquesa of Belvís de las Navas
19. María de la Trinidad von Scholtz-Hermensdorff, 2nd Marquesa of Belvís de las Navas
2. Prince Marco of Hohenlohe-Langenburg, 19th Duke of Medinaceli
20. Luis de Medina y Garvey
10. Rafael de Medina y Vilallonga
21. Amelia de Vilallonga e Ybarra
5. Ana de Medina y Fernández de Córdoba, 10th Countess of Ofalia
22. Luis Fernández de Córdoba y Salabert, 17th Duke of Medinaceli
11. Victoria Eugenia Fernández de Córdoba, 18th Duchess of Medinaceli
23. Ana María Fernández de Henestrosa; y Gayoso de los Cobos
1. Princess Victoria of Hohenlohe-Langenburg, 20th Duchess of Medinaceli
24. Dr. jur. Carl Schmidt-Polex
12. Dr. jur. Hans-Walter Schmidt-Polex
25. Justine Marianne Melly Andreae
6. Hans-Carl Schmidt-Polex
13. Liselotte Bender
3. Sandra Schmidt-Polex
14. N. Goepfer
7. Karin Goepfer
15. Gerti N.

Spanish nobility
Preceded by Prince Marco of Hohenlohe-Langenburg	Duchess of Medinaceli; 2017–present	Incumbent; Heir: Prince Alexander Gonzalo of Hohenlohe-Langenburg, 14th Duke of Ciudad Real
