= Marco de Hohenlohe-Langenburg =

Prince Marco of Hohenlohe-Langenburg
- Grandee of Spain

Duke of Medinaceli
- Reign: 18 August 2013 – 19 August 2016
- Predecessor: Victoria Fernández de Córdoba
- Successor: Princess Victoria of Hohenlohe-Langenburg
- Born: 8 March 1962; Madrid, Francoist Spain
- Died: 19 August 2016 (aged 54); Seville, Spain
- Burial: Cemetery of Saint Barnabas, Marbella, Spain
- Spouse: Sandra Schmidt-Polex (m. 1996; div. 2004)
- Issue: Princess Victoria Elisabeth; Prince Alexander Gonzalo
- House: Hohenlohe-Langenburg (agnatic); Medinaceli (cognatic)
- Father: Prince Max of Hohenlohe-Langenburg
- Mother: Ana Luisa de Medina y Fernández de Córdoba
- Religion: Roman Catholicism

Prince Marco de Hohenlohe-Langenburg, 19th Duke of Medinaceli, GE (German: Marco Prinz zu Hohenlohe-Langenburg; Spanish: Marco de Hohenlohe-Langenburg y Medina; 8 March 1962 – 19 August 2016), was a Spanish nobleman of German descent, head of the ducal House of Medinaceli and a dynast of the German princely House of Hohenlohe-Langenburg.

== Life and family ==
Ducal arms of Medinaceli

Prince Marco was born in Madrid, Spain, on 8 March 1962. He was the eldest son of Prince Max of Hohenlohe-Langenburg by his then wife Ana Luisa de Medina y Fernández de Córdoba, 12th Marquise of Navahermosa and 10th Countess of Ofalia (1940−2012), who was the eldest child of Victoria Eugenia Fernández de Córdoba, 18th Duchess of Medinaceli (1917–2013).

Prince Marco's mother, the previous heiress to the dukedom of Medinaceli, predeceased her mother in 2012. He succeeded as duke when his grandmother, the 18th Duchess of Medinaceli, died in 2013. He preserved his family's cultural heritage as director of the Fundación Medinaceli.

In 1996, he married a German citizen, Sandra Schmidt-Polex, whose family belonged to a wealthy Frankfurt banking and industrial dynasty that rose to prominence in the 19th century, played an influential role in financial and corporate circles, and was closely connected by marriage to other prominent Frankfurt business families—such as the Andreae, de Bary, and Bansa—as well as to several families of the German nobility.

They had two children:

- Princess Victoria Elisabeth of Hohenlohe-Langenburg, 20th Duchess of Medinaceli (b. Málaga, 17 March 1997)
- Prince Alexander Gonzalo of Hohenlohe-Langenburg, 14th Duke of Ciudad Real, 13th Marquess of Navahermosa (b. Málaga, 9 March 1999)

They divorced in 2004.

== See also ==
- Spanish nobility
- Mediatized houses
- German nobility

Spanish nobility
Preceded by Victoria Eugenia Fernández de Córdoba	Duke of Medinaceli; 2013–2016	Succeeded by Princess Victoria of Hohenlohe-Langenburg
