= Manuel de los Cobos, 4th Marquess of Camarasa =

Spanish aristocrat, viceroy and Grandee of Spain

Manuel de los Cobos, 4th Marquess of Camarasa, (c. 1606 – 21 June 1668), 4th Count of Ricla, was a Spanish aristocrat, viceroy, and Grandee of Spain during the reign of Philip IV.

== Early life ==
De los Cobos was born in c. 1606 in Sardinia. He was the son of Diego de los Cobos y de Guzman, who was awarded the title of Duke of Sabiote on 10 October 1626. He was a grandson of Francisco Manuel de los Cobos y Luna, 2nd Marquess of Camarasa.

== Career ==
Manuel de los Cobos was a Grandee of Spain, Mayordomo mayor of King Philip IV (1640–1642), Viceroy of Valencia (1659–1663) and Viceroy of Sardinia (1665–1668), where he was assassinated in 1668. He was also 4th Marquess of Camarasa since 1645, 2nd Duke of Sabiote, 2nd Marquess of Estepa and 2nd Marquess of Laula, 10th Count of Ribadavia, 8th Count of Castrogeriz, 3rd Count of Villazopeque, 4th Count of Ricla, and many other lesser titles.

== Personal life ==
His second wife was Isabel de Portocarrero y de Luna, (1627–1694), daughter of Cristobal de Portocarrero, 3rd Count of Montijo. Together, they were the parents of a son, who was successor to the title of 5th Marquess of Camarasa:

- Baltasar de los Cobos y Portocarrero (d. 1715), a Knight of the Order of the Golden Fleece and Viceroy of Aragon.

The Marquess of Camarasa was assassinated in Sardinia on 21 June 1668.

Spanish nobility
Preceded by Diego de los Cobos	Marquess of Camarasa; 1645–1668	Succeeded by Baltasar de los Cobos
