= Marquess of Camarasa =

Marquessate of Camarasa
- Creation date: 18 February 1543
- Created by: Charles I
- Peerage: Peerage of Spain
- First holder: Diego de los Cobos y Mendoza, 1st Marquess of Camarasa
- Present holder: Victoria Elisabeth Hohenlohe-Langenburg y Schmidt-Polex, 18th Marchioness of Camarasa

Marquess of Camarasa (Spanish: Marqués de Camarasa) is a hereditary title in the Peerage of Spain accompanied by the dignity of Grandee, granted in 1543 by Charles II to Diego de los Cobos y Mendoza (who was son of Francisco de los Cobos y Molina) as a gift of his marriage to Francisca Luisa de Luna y Mendoza, who was Lady of Camarasa.

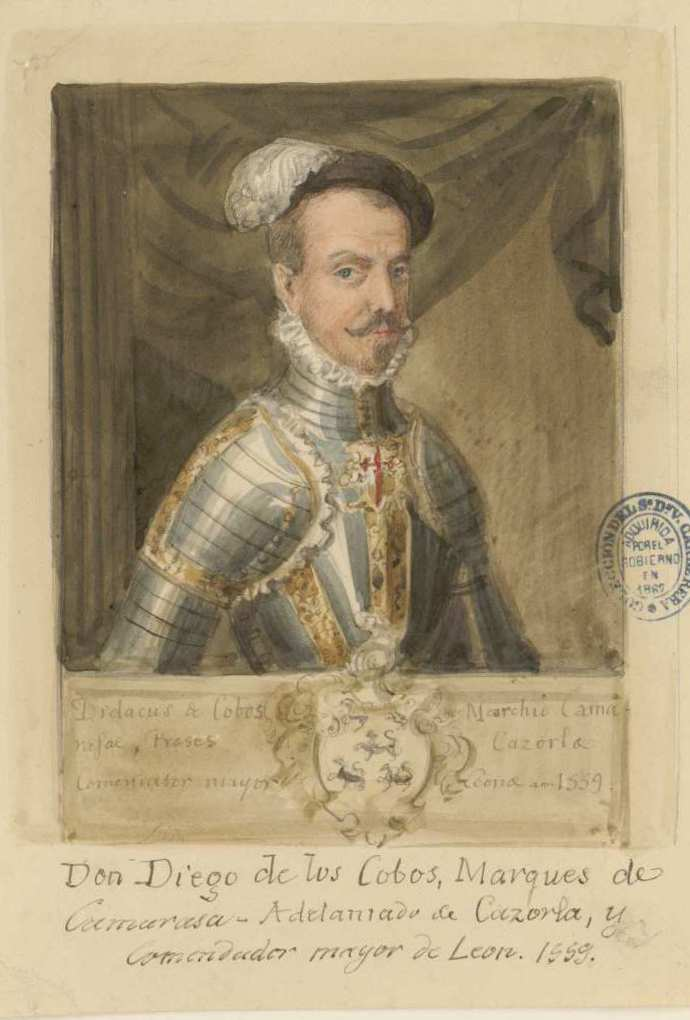
Drawing of the 1st Marquess of Camarasa, by Valentín Carderera

== Marquesses of Camarasa (1543) ==
- Diego de los Cobos y Mendoza, 1st Marquess of Camarasa (d. 1576)
- Francisco Manuel de los Cobos y Luna, 2nd Marquess of Camarasa (d. 1616), son of the 1st Marquess
- Diego de los Cobos y Guzmán, 3rd Marquess of Camarasa (d. 1645), son of the 2nd Marquess
- Manuel de los Cobos, 4th Marquess of Camarasa (d. 1668), grandson of the 2nd Marquess
- Baltasar Manrique de Mendoza de los Cobos y Luna, 5th Marquess of Camarasa (d. 1715), son of the 4th Marquess
- Miguel Baltasar Sarmiento de los Cobos, 6th Marquess of Camarasa (d. 1733), grandson of the 4th Marquess
- María Micaela Gómez de los Cobos, 7th Marchioness of Camarasa (1701-1747), daughter of the 6th Marquess
- Leonor Gómez de los Cobos, 8th Marchioness of Camarasa (d. 1762), daughter of the 5th Marquess
- María Ignacia Sarmiento de los Cobos, 9th Marchioness of Camarasa (d. 1773), daughter of the 5th Marquess
- Baltasara de los Cobos y Luna, 10th Marchioness of Camarasa (d. 1791), daughter of the 5th Marquess
- Domingo Gayoso de los Cobos, 11th Marquess of Camarasa (1736-1803), great-grandson of the 5th Marquess
- Joaquín María Gayoso de los Cobos y Bermúdez De Castro, 12th Marquess of Camarasa (1778-1849), son of the 11th Marquess
- Francisco de Borja Gayoso Téllez-Girón de los Cobos Luna y Mendoza, 13th Marquess of Camarasa (d. 1860), son of the 12th Marquess
- Jacobo Gayoso de los Cobos y Téllez-Girón, 14th Marquess of Camarasa (1816-1871), son of the 12th Marquess
- Francisca de Borja Gayoso de los Cobos y Sevilla, 15th Marchioness of Camarasa (1854-1926), daughter of the 14th Marquess
- Ignacio Fernández de Henestrosa y Gayoso de los Cobos, 16th Marquess of Camarasa (1880-1948), son of the 15th Marchioness
- Victoria Eugenia Fernández de Córdoba y Fernández de Henestrosa, 17th Marchioness of Camarasa (1917-2013), great-granddaughter of the 15th Marchioness
- Victoria Elisabeth Hohenlohe-Langenburg y Schmidt-Polex, 18th Marchioness of Camarasa (b. 1997), great-granddaughter of the 17th Marchioness

== See also ==
- List of current grandees of Spain
