= Hohenlohe-Langenburg =

Former German county of northeastern Baden-Württemberg

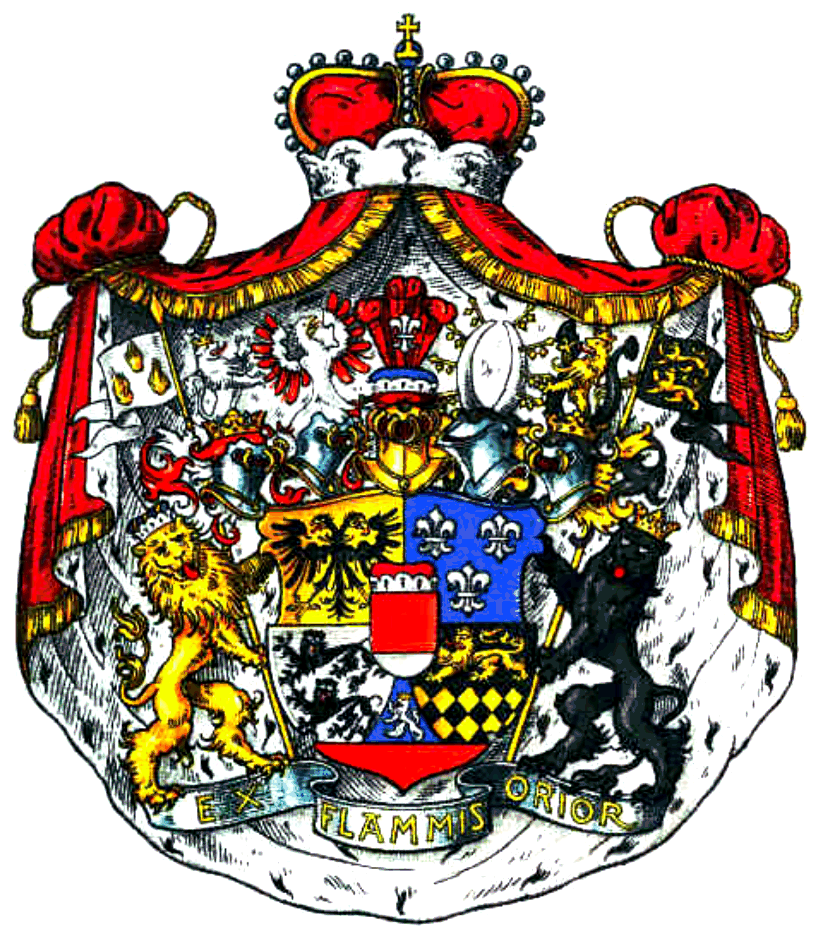
Coat of arms of the Princes of Hohenlohe-Langenburg

Hohenlohe-Langenburg (German pronunciation: [hoːənˌloːə ˈlaŋənbʊɐ̯k]) was a German county and later principality in the Holy Roman Empire. It was located around Langenburg in what is now northeastern Baden-Württemberg, Germany. Starting in medieval times and continuing until 1806, this small state was ruled by a branch of the House of Hohenlohe, first as lords, then as counts and ultimately as ruling princes of the Holy Roman Empire after 1764. The princely House of Hohenlohe-Langenburg still owns and lives in Langenburg Castle today.

== History ==
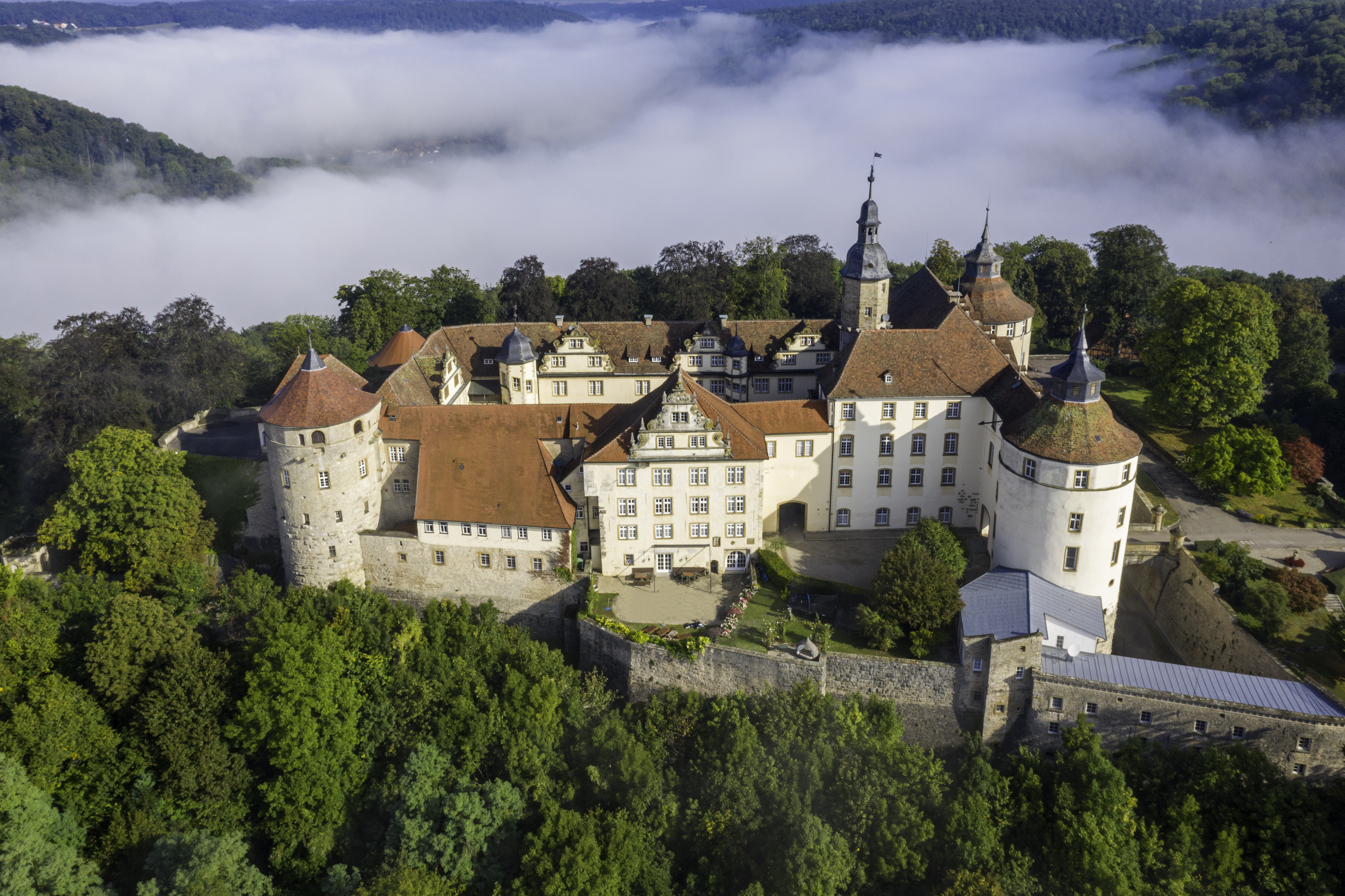
Langenburg Castle

In 1253, the town and castle of Langenburg were inherited by the lords of Hohenlohe, after the lords of Langenburg had become extinct. Despite repeated divisions during the 13th and 15th centuries and a donation to the Teutonic Order in 1219, the House of Hohenlohe was able to form an almost complete territory of which Langenburg was a part. The lordship of Hohenlohe was elevated to the status of a county in 1495. The house often divided its possessions so that different lines emerged and sometimes merged again later.

In 1586–1590, the Neuenstein line split into the Langenburg side line under Count Friedrich. Of the Protestant branch of Hohenlohe-Neuenstein, which underwent several partitions and inherited the county of Gleichen in Thuringia (with its residence at Ohrdruf) in 1631, the senior line became extinct in 1805, while in 1701 the junior line divided itself into three branches, those of Hohenlohe-Langenburg, Hohenlohe-Ingelfingen and Hohenlohe-Kirchberg. Hohenlohe-Langenburg was raised from a county to a principality in 1701, and it was mediatised to Württemberg in 1806.

The House of Hohenlohe-Langenburg has remained Protestant, and it has been closely related to Europe's Protestant ruling dynasties. Queen Adelaide of the United Kingdom was a Hohenlohe-Langenburg on her mother's side and her cousin, Prince Ernst, was married in 1828 to Feodora of Leiningen, the half-sister of the future Queen Victoria. In 1896, Feodora's grandson, another Prince Ernst, married Victoria's granddaughter, Princess Alexandra of Edinburgh and Saxe-Coburg-Gotha. Prince Gottfried (1897–1960) was married in 1931 to his second cousin once removed, Princess Margarita of Greece and Denmark (1905–1981). She was the eldest daughter of Prince Andrew of Greece and Denmark and his wife Princess Alice of Battenberg, and sister of Prince Philip, Duke of Edinburgh. Members of the British royal family therefore still occasionally visit Langenburg and, conversely, the Hohenlohe-Langenburgs are regular guests at the British court.

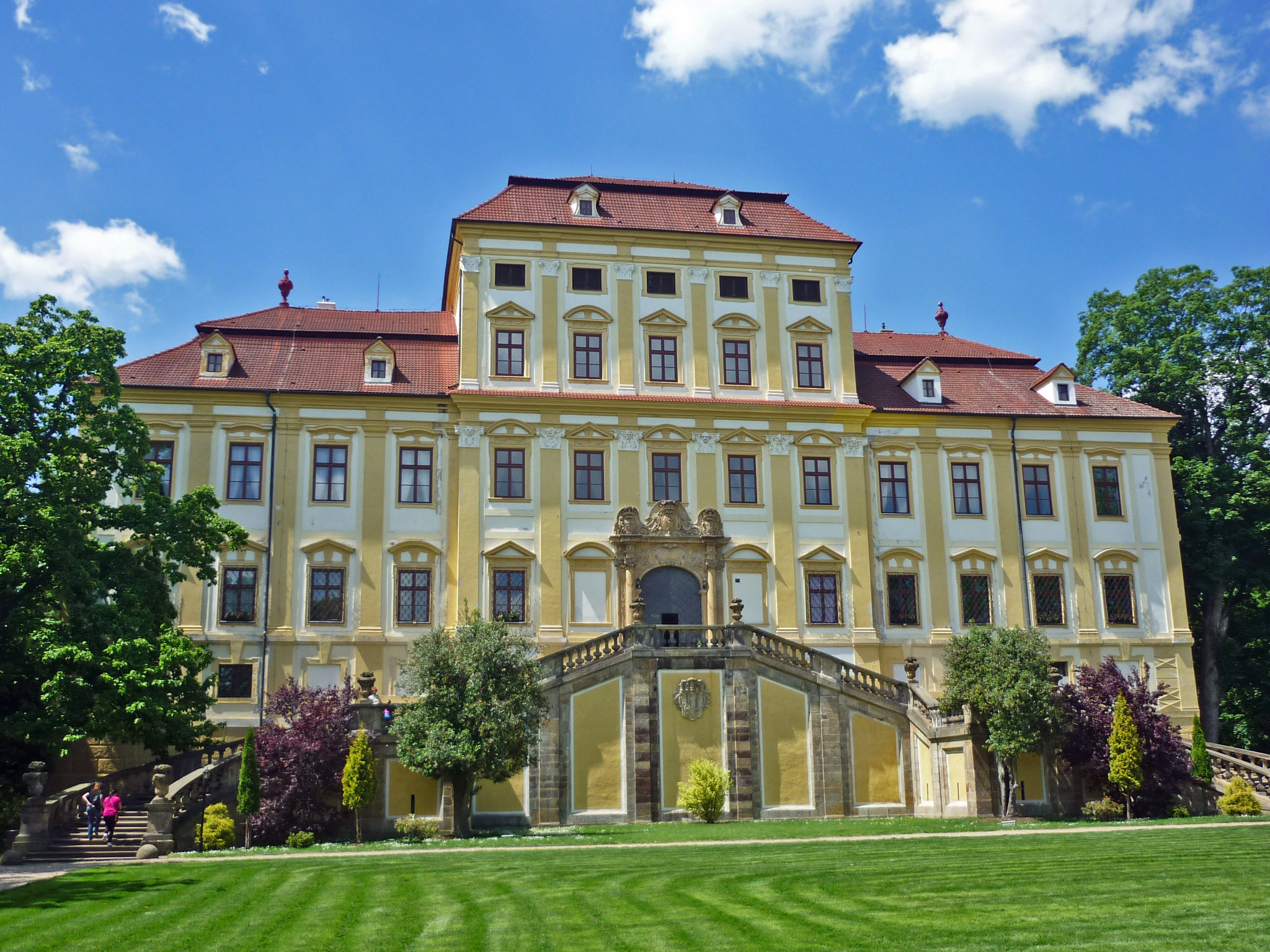
Rothenhaus Castle in Jirkov

Prince Karl Gustav Wilhelm of Hohenlohe-Langenburg (1777–1866), who came from a younger branch, founded a Catholic, Bohemian branch at Rothenhaus Castle (today Červený Hrádek Castle in Jirkov, Czech Republic) during the 19th century. As one of 16 mediatized princely houses of the former Holy Roman Empire, then residing in Austria-Hungary, this family had a hereditary seat in the House of Lords (Austria). Prince Max Egon (1897–1968) tried to prevent the occupation of Czechoslovakia by Hitler in 1938 through diplomatic negotiations with the British government. After World War II, Prince Max Egon was expropriated by the communist government. Due to the wealthy Spanish origins of his wife, his descendants lived mainly in Spain, including Prince Alfonso of Hohenlohe-Langenburg, Prince Max of Hohenlohe-Langenburg, Prince Marco of Hohenlohe-Langenburg and Princess Victoria of Hohenlohe-Langenburg, 20th Duchess of Medinaceli.

== Counts of Hohenlohe-Langenburg (1610–1764) ==
- Philipp Ernst, Count 1610–1628 (1584–1628); son of Wolfgang zu Hohenlohe (died 1610)
  - Ludwig Kraft, Count 1628–1632 (1613–1632)
  - Joachim Albert, Count 1632–1650 (1619–1675); also Count of Hohenlohe-Kirchberg
  - Henry Frederick, Count 1650–1699 (1625–1699)
    - Christian Kraft, Count 1699–1701 (1668–1743); also Count of Hohenlohe-Ingelfingen
    - Frederick Eberhard, Count 1699–1701 (1672–1737); also Count of Hohenlohe-Kirchberg
    - Albert Wolfgang, Count 1701–1715 (1659–1715)
      - Louis, Count 1715–1764 (1696–1765); raised to Prince Jan 7, 1764

== Princes of Hohenlohe-Langenburg (1764–1806; titular to the present) ==
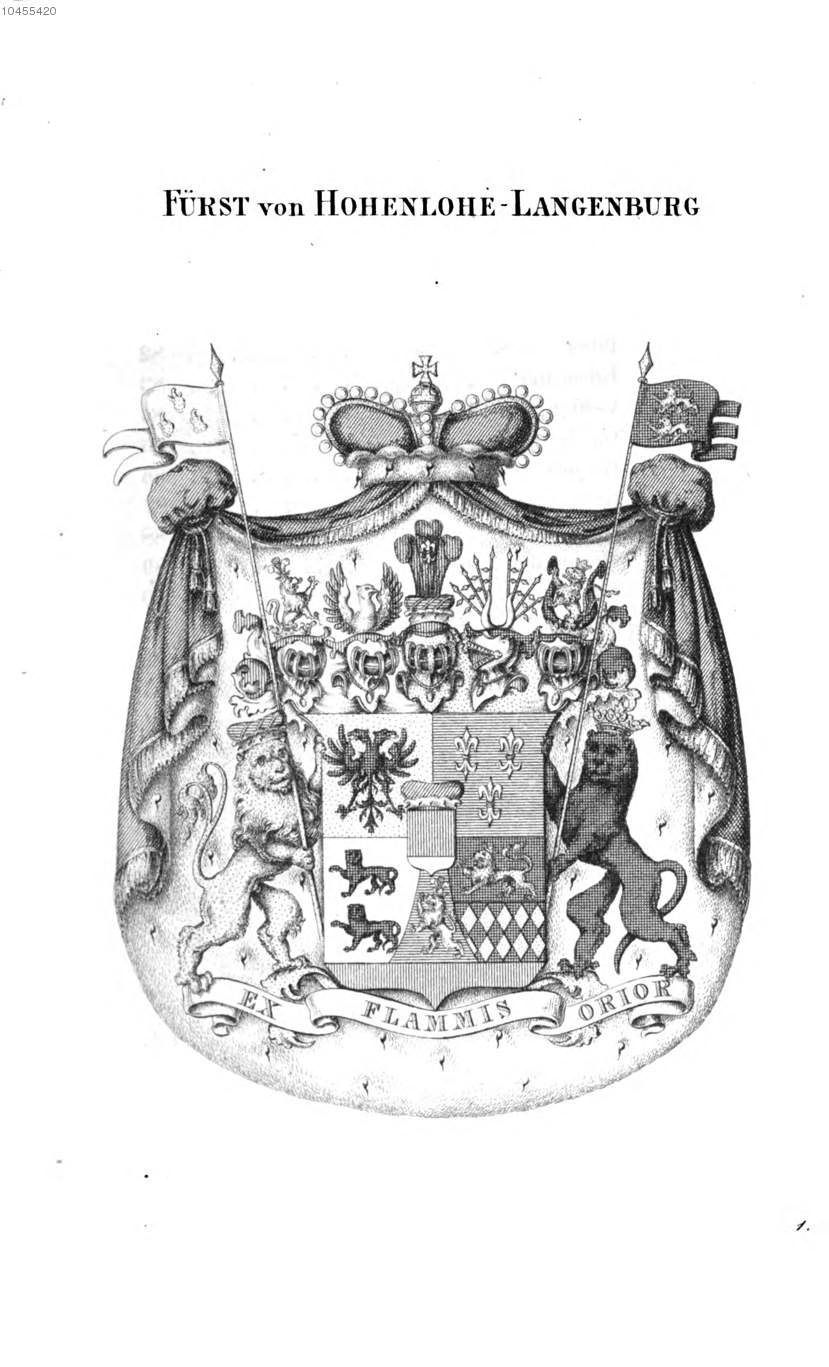
Antique print of the princely arms

- Louis, 1st Prince 1764–1765 (1696–1765)
  - Christian Albert, 2nd Prince 1765–1789 (1726–1789)
    - Carl Ludwig I, 3rd Prince 1789–1825 (1762–1825)
      - Ernst I, 4th Prince 1825–1860 (1794–1860)
        - Carl Ludwig II, 5th Prince April 12–21, 1860 (1829–1907); renounced his rights. With issue on the Barons von Bronn
        - Hermann, 6th Prince 1860–1913 (1832–1913)
          - Ernst II, 7th Prince 1913–1950 (1863–1950)
            - Gottfried, 8th Prince 1950–1960 (1897–1960)
              - Kraft, 9th Prince 1960–2004 (1935–2004)
                - Philipp Gottfried Alexander, 10th Prince 2004–present (born 1970)
                  - Prince Max-Leopold
                  - Prince Gustav
              - Prince Georg (1938–2021)
              - Prince Rupprecht (1944–1978)
              - Prince Albrecht (1944–1992)
                - Prince Ludwig Ferdinand (born 1976)
            - Prince Alfred (1911–1911)
        - Prince Victor (1833–1891); renounced his rights. With issue on the Counts von Gleichen
      - Prince Henry Gustav of Hohenlohe-Langenburg (1806-1861)
    - Gustav Adolf (1764-1796)
    - Ludwig Wilhelm (1767-1768)
    - Christian August (1768-1796)
  - Friedrich Karl (1728–1728)
  - Wilhelm Friedrich (1736–1805)
  - Philipp Karl (1738–1753)
  - Friedrich August (1740–1810)
  - Ludwig Gottfried (1742–1765)
  - Friedrich Ernst (1750–1794)
    - Prince Ludwig Christian (1774-1844)
    - Prince Karl Gustav Wilhelm (1777–1866); founder of the catholic Bohemian branch
      - Prince Friedrich Ernst (1817-1835)
      - Prince Ludwig Karl Gustav (1823–1866) ∞ Gabriela of Trauttmansdorff-Weinsberg (1840–1923), heiress of Rothenhaus Castle
        - Prince Gottfried Karl Joseph (1860–1933)
          - Prince Ludwig (1892-1945)
            - Prince Alexander (1922-1993)
              - Prince Alexander
              - Prince Albrecht
            - Prince Gottfried (1924-2026)
          - Prince Max Egon (1897–1968), private diplomat in World War II
            - Prince Alfonso (1924–2003)
              - Prince Christoph (1956-2006)
              - Prince Hubertus (born 1959)
            - Prince Christian (1925-1980)
            - Prince Max (Wonny) (1931–1994)
              - Prince Marco, 19th Duke of Medinaceli (1962-2016)
                - Prince Alexander Gonzalo, 14th Duke of Ciudad Real (1999)
              - Prince Pablo (1963)

== See also ==
- Hohenlohe
- Princess of Hohenlohe-Langenburg
