= Pedro Afán de Ribera =

Spanish nobleman

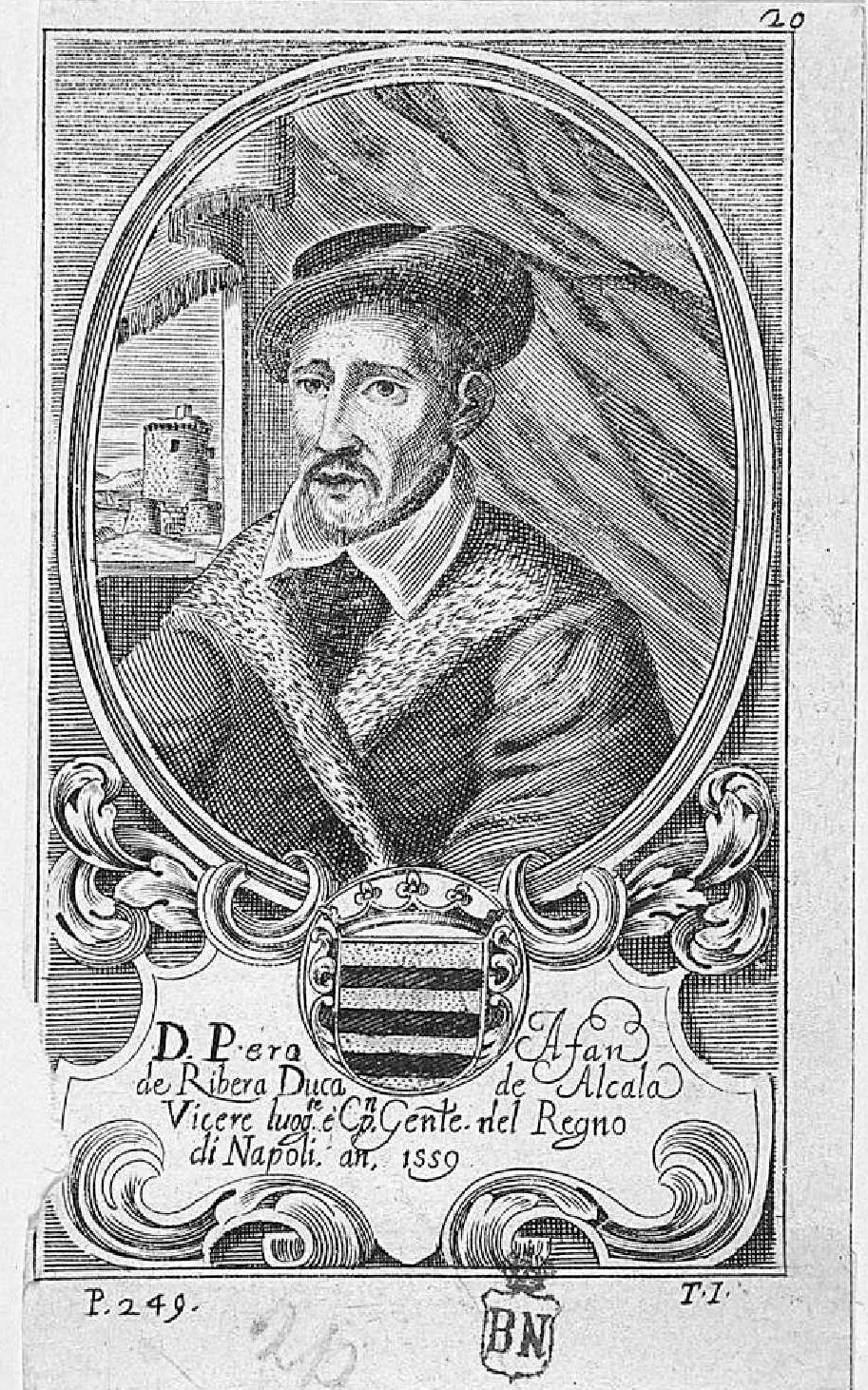
The Duke of Alcalá de los Gazules

Pedro Afán de Ribera, 1st Duke of Alcalá de los Gazules, Virrey y Capitán General de Cataluña y Nápoles (died 1571), also known as Pedro Enriquez Afan de Ribera or Per Afán de Ribera y Portocarrero or Perafán de Ribera y Portocarrero, was a Spanish nobleman most notable for his twelve-year-long service as Viceroy of Naples, Viceroy of Catalonia and 1st Duke of Alcalá de los Gazules.

== Life and career ==
Pedro Afán de Ribera was born in Tarifa, Cádiz, the son of Fernando Enriquez, a member of the Enriquez family, which descended from royal bastards living in the 14th century. His mother's family, the Afan de Ribera were located in Sevilla and Cádiz and were involved in the slave trade and the settlement of the Canary Islands.

He was the 2nd Marquis of Tarifa, 4th Count of Los Molares and Adelantado of Andalucía. He served as Viceroy of Catalonia from 1554 to 1558 and was elevated Duke of Alcalá de los Gazules in 1558.

In 1559, he was appointed Viceroy of Naples and held on to this position until his death. As Viceroy, he blocked the promulgation of the decrees of the Ecumenical Council of Trent and also Philip II of Spain's wish to introduce the Spanish Inquisition into the Kingdom of Naples. He also continued his predecessors' patronage of the Renaissance composer Diego Ortiz. He fought criminal organizations such as the Calabrian pirates and thieves, exterminating the Marco Berardi gang.

In 1565, Afán de Ribera dispelled the naval blockade by the Turks of Malta. The following year the Turks attacked Naples. In 1570, Afán de Ribera send a naval fleet to relieve Cyprus from naval attacks.

He died in Naples in 1571 without legitimate issue. Therefore, the title of Duke of Alcalá de los Gazules passed to his brother Fernando Afán de Rivera.

== Family ==
He married Leonor Ponce de Leon, but did not father any legitimate children with her but fathered at two known illegitimate children:

- Saint Juan de Ribera (1532–1611), Archbishop of Valencia, who was beatified in 1796 and canonized in 1960.
- Catalina de Rivera y Mosquera, who married Pedro Barroso, marquis of Malpica.

== Collection of antiquities ==
His appointment as Viceroy of Naples brought Afán de Ribera to Italy, where the collecting of Greek and Roman art was an important element of Renaissance culture. He quickly began to imitate the aristocratic Italian collectors of the day, purchasing hundreds of works of ancient sculpture and other antiquities, which he shipped back to Seville to adorn his palace, the Casa de Pilatos. So eager was he to acquire new pieces for his collection that he was called "un neuvo Verres" (a reference to Gaius Verres, the Roman governor of Sicily attacked by Cicero for exploiting the province and stripping it of its art treasures). Following the marriage alliance between the Ribera and Medinaceli families in 1623, the collection passed into the hands of the Dukes of Medinaceli and was moved to Madrid, where it was displayed first in the Palacio rosado on the Paseo del Prado, and then, in the early 20th century, in the Palacio de Uceda on the Plaza de Colón. In the 1960s the latter palace was sold and demolished and the collection was broken up, with some pieces going to the Marquesa of Cardona in Cordoba, and others eventually returning to the Casa de Pilatos in Seville.
