= Duke of Alcalá de los Gazules =

Dukedom of Spain

Dukedom of Alcalá de los Gazules
- Creation date: 1558
- Created by: Philip II
- Peerage: Peerage of Spain
- First holder: Pedro Afán de Ribera y Portocarrero, 1st Duke of Alcalá
- Present holder: Victoria de Hohenlohe-Langenburg y Schmidt-Polex, 17th Duchess of Alcalá

Duke of Alcalá de los Gazules (Spanish: Duque de Alcalá de los Gazules), commonly known as Duke of Alcalá, is an hereditary title in the Peerage of Spain accompanied by the dignity of Grandee, granted in 1558 by Philip II to Pedro Afán de Ribera, 3rd Marquess of Tarifa, Lord of Alcalá de los Gazules and Viceroy of Naples and Catalonia.

== History ==
The territory of the dukedom was a part of the Kingdom of Granada until 1264, when it was won by King Alfonso X of Castile. The Granadans had named the castle and its surrounding lands the Qalat at Yazula, Arabic for "Castle of the Gazules", from which its Spanish name is derived.

== Dukes of Alcalá de los Gazules (1558) ==
- Pedro Afán de Ribera y Portocarrero, 1st Duke of Alcalá (1558-1571)
- Fernando Enríquez de Ribera y Portocarrero, 2nd Duke of Alcalá (1571-1594)
- Fernando Afán de Ribera y Téllez-Girón, 3rd Duke of Alcalá (1594-1637)
- María Afán de Ribera y Moura, 4th Duchess of Alcalá (1637-1639)
- Ana Francisca Enríquez de Ribera y Portocarrero, 5th Duchess of Alcalá (1639-1645)
- Juan Francisco de la Cerda y Enríquez de Ribera, 6th Duke of Alcalá (1645-1691)
- Luis Francisco de la Cerda y Aragón, 7th Duke of Alcalá (1691-1711)
- Nicolás María Fernández de Córdoba y de la Cerda, 8th Duke of Alcalá (1711-1739)
- Luis Antonio Fernández de Córdoba y Spínola, 9th Duke of Alcalá (1739-1768)
- Pedro de Alcántara Fernández de Córdoba y Moncada, 10th Duke of Alcalá (1768-1789)
- Luis María Fernández de Córdoba y Gonzaga, 11th Duke of Alcalá (1789-1806)
- Luis Joaquín Fernández de Córdoba y Benavides, 12th Duke of Alcalá (1806-1840)
- Luis Tomás Fernández de Córdoba y Ponce de León, 13th Duke of Alcalá (1840-1873)
- Luis María Fernández de Córdoba y Pérez de Barradas, 14th Duke of Alcalá (1873-1879)
- Luis Fernández de Córdoba y Salabert, 15th Duke of Alcalá (1880-1951)
- Victoria Eugenia Fernández de Córdoba y Fernández de Henestrosa, 16th Duchess of Alcalá (1951-2013)
- Victoria de Hohenlohe-Langenburg y Schmidt-Polex, 17th Duchess of Alcalá (2018)
