= Diego Ortiz =

Spanish composer and music theorist

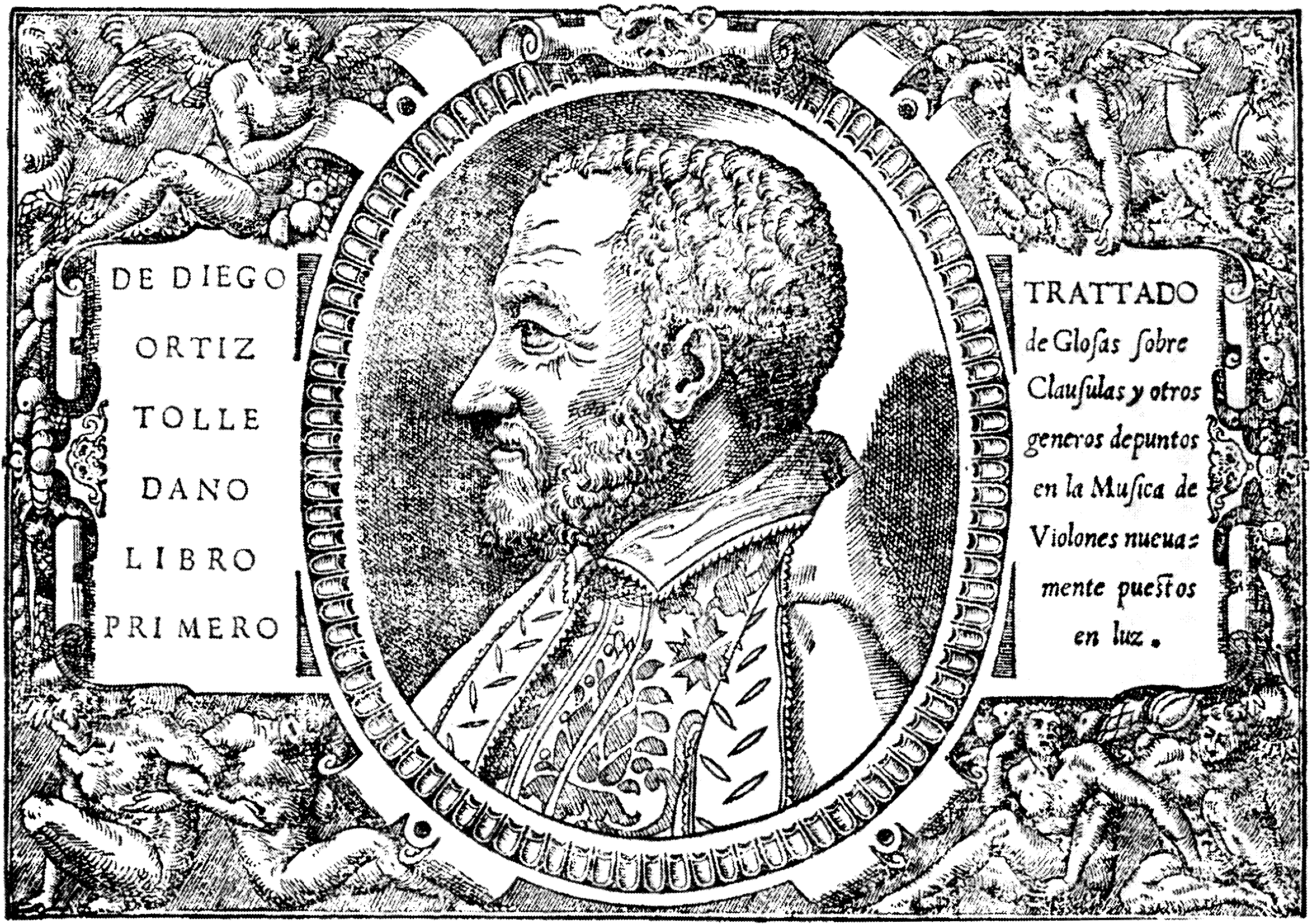
Portrait of Diego Ortiz from the title page of his Trattado de Glosas (1553)

Diego Ortiz (c. 1510 – c. 1576) was a Spanish composer and music theorist in service to the viceroy of Naples ruled by the Spanish monarchs Charles V and Philip II. Ortiz published the first manual on ornamentation for bowed string instruments, and a large collection of sacred vocal compositions.

Recercada primera sobre tenores italianos from Trattado de Glosas, Libro Secundo (1553)

Recercada segunda sobre tenores italianos from Trattado de Glosas, Libro Secundo (1553)
Performed by Phillip W. Serna, Treble, Tenor & Bass Viols with Lute

== Biography ==
Very little is known about Ortiz's life. He is believed to have been born in Toledo and probably died in Rome, where his trail is lost.

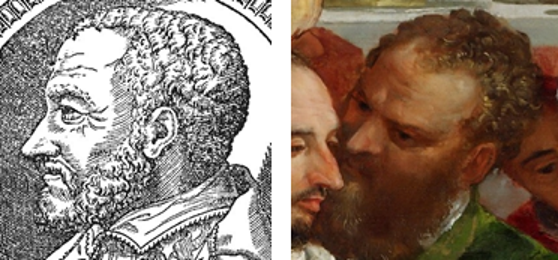
Comparison of the facial features of Ortiz in his Trattado de Glosas and the viola da gamba player depicted in The Wedding at Cana (1563), Paolo Veronese, according to the model proposed by Lafarga et al. (2017)

In 1553 Ortiz was living in the viceroyalty of Naples. Five years later, the third duke of Alba, Fernando Álvarez de Toledo, appointed him maestro di cappella of the Chapel Royal of Naples. In 1565 Ortiz still held the post under the Viceroy Pedro Afán de Ribera, duke of Alcalá. A recent study suggests that Diego Ortiz could have been the model for a very relevant personage in the famous work of Paolo Caliari Veronese "The Wedding at Cana", based on the instrumental ensemble represented by the painter, the edition date of Ortiz's second book Musices liber primus in Venice, the repeated confusions and misattributions about this person in the literature down to the present, and the striking resemblance of the painted character with the only known engraved portrait of the musician.

Recent findings reveal that he, after his service to the Spanish Neapolitan Court, as Maestro di Cappella appeared, as "famigliare", in the Colonna's Court in Rome, at least from April 1572 to September 1576.

== Works ==
Ortiz published two music books: Trattado de Glosas in 1553 and Musices liber primus in 1565.

=== Trattado de Glossas ===
The Trattado de Glosas (modern Spanish spelling Tratado de Glosas) is considered a masterpiece of literature for the viola da gamba. The work was published on 10 December 1553, in Rome under the Spanish title Trattado de glossas sobre clausulas y otros generos de puntos en la musica de violones nuevamente puestos en luz. The Italian edition was published at the same time, with the title Glose sopra le cadenze et altre sorte de punti in la musica del violone. The Italian edition is full of Hispanicisms, which suggests that Ortiz made this version himself.

=== Musices liber primus ===
Ortiz published a collection of polyphonic religious music in 1565 in Venice. Musices liber primus hymnos, Magnificas, Salves, motecta, psalmos includes sixty-nine compositions for four to seven voices, based on plainchant works. They are stylistically conservative for the period, appropriate to the tastes of the dedicatee, Ortiz's employer, Pedro Afán de Rivera, Duke of Alcalá and the Spanish Viceroy in Naples. In the preface to this publication, Ortiz encourages performers to accompany these sacred polyphonic works with instruments, a practice favoured at the time in Spain, and promises future publication of a book of masses which never appeared.
