= Luis Fernández de Córdoba, 17th Duke of Medinaceli =

Spanish nobleman and distinguished hunter

The Most Excellent The Duke of Medinaceli GE
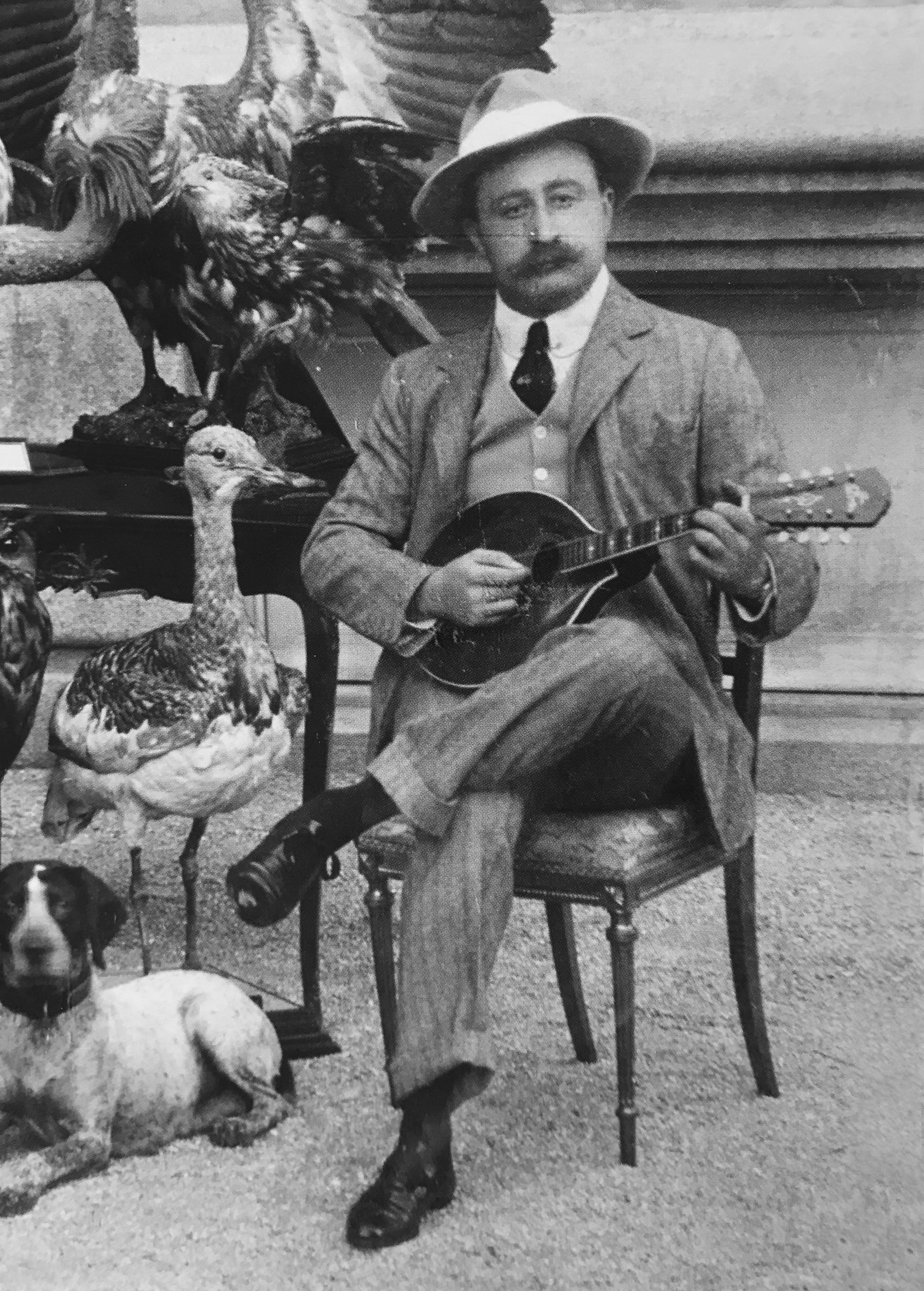
- Pictured in 1923

Personal details
- Born: 16 January 1880 Madrid, Spain
- Died: July 13, 1956 (aged 76) Madrid, Spain
- Spouse(s): Ana María Fernández de Henestrosa y Gayoso de los Cobos (m. 1911; died 1938) María de la Concepción Rey y de Pablo Blanco (m. 1939)
- Children: Victoria Eugenia Fernández de Córdoba y Fernández de Henestrosa, 18th Duchess of Medinaceli; María de La Paz Fernández de Córdoba y Fernández de Henestrosa, 16th Duchess of Lerma; Casilda Fernández de Córdoba y Pablo Blanco, 20th Duchess of Cardona

Luis Jesús Fernández de Córdoba y Salabert, 17th Duke of Medinaceli, GE (16 January 1880 – 13 July 1956), was a Spanish nobleman and trophy hunter. He was born the world's most titled person since his father, the 16th Duke, had died months before in a hunting accident. He was 11 times a duke, 17 a marquess, 15 a count and 4 a viscount.

== Early life ==
Born as the only son of the 16th Duke of Medinaceli, Luis María Fernández de Córdoba y Pérez de Barradas, and his second wife Casilda Remigia de Salabert y Arteaga, 9th Marchioness of Torrecilla. He was baptised the day after his birth in the parish church of San Luis Obispo of Madrid. He was born posthumously to his father, who had died in a hunting accident some months earlier and as such he assumed the historical titles of the House of Medinaceli from birth.

His mother, who would become the 11th Duchess of Ciudad Real in her own right, remarried the politician Mariano Fernández de Henestrosa, 1st Duke of Santo Mauro, in 1884. Through them, Luis was a half brother to Rafael and Casilda Fernández de Henestrosa.

== Marriage and issue ==
In 1911, he married Ana María Fernández de Henestrosa y Gayoso de los Cobos, lady-in-waiting of Queen Ena, daughter of the 8th Count of Moriana del Río, a Gentilhombre Grandee of Alfonso XIII. The ceremony took place in Madrid.

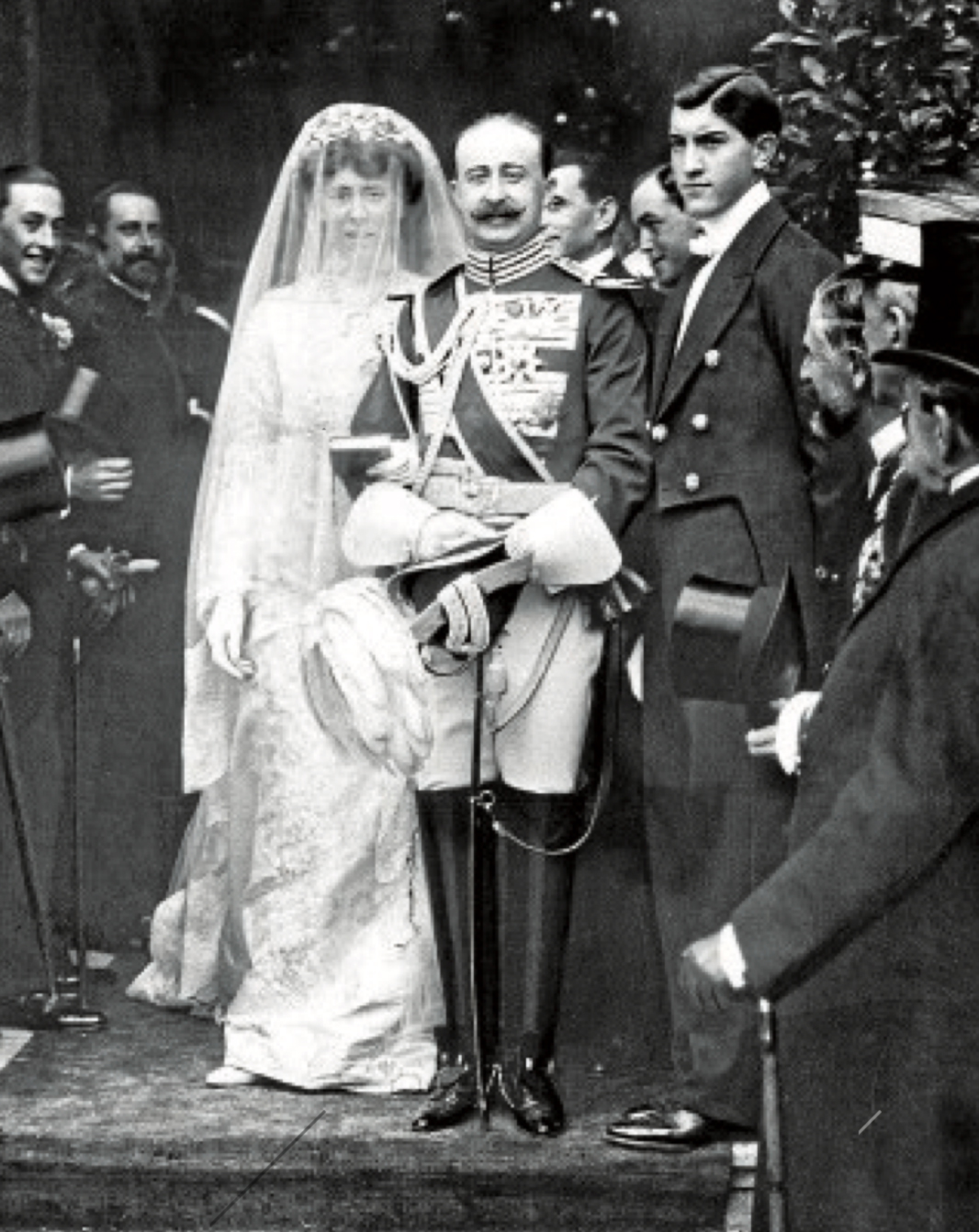
At his wedding in 1911

From his first marriage he had two daughters:

- Victoria Eugenia Fernández de Córdoba y Fernández de Henestrosa, 18th Duchess of Medinaceli (Madrid, April 16, 1917 - Seville, August 18, 2013);
- María de la Paz Fernández de Córdoba y Fernández de Henestrosa (Madrid, January 22, 1919 - Alcalá de los Gazules, October 3, 1998), who would become the 16th Duchess of Lerma in 1957.

In 1938 his first wife Ana María died. He remarried on December 22, 1939, with María de la Concepción Rey de Pablo Blanco, with whom he had a daughter:

- Casilda Fernández de Córdoba y Rey (Madrid, 1941 - Córdoba, April 19, 1998), 20th Duchess of Cardona.

== Later life ==
In 1929, he was granted the Order of the Golden Fleece by Alfonso XIII. The collar he had been bestowed with had once belonged to Louis Bonaparte, Napoleon's younger brother.

He inherited his fondness for hunting and horse-riding from his grandmother Angela Pérez de Barradas y Bernuy, 1st Duchess of Denia and Tarifa — titles that he also held when his uncle Carlos María Fernández de Córdoba died. He was an indefatigable traveler, at the same time that he carried out numerous investigations, especially in the field of falconry, and founded the Spanish Museum of Trophy Hunting. In 1927 he was elected a member of the Royal Academy of Exact, Physical and Natural Sciences; His entrance speech was about birds of prey in falconry.

Considered one of the main exponents of big-game hunting in Europe, the duke made expeditions to British East Africa (1908-1909) and the North Pole (1910, 1921). In addition, he wrote numerous publications on hunting and nature, and in his palace in Madrid he founded a museum of natural history, the collection of which had to be transferred to the Museo Nacional de Ciencias Naturales at the outbreak of the Spanish Civil War in 1936.

After suffering a myocardial infarction, Luis Fernández de Córdoba died on July 13, 1956, in the now disappeared Palace of the Duke of Uceda in Madrid.

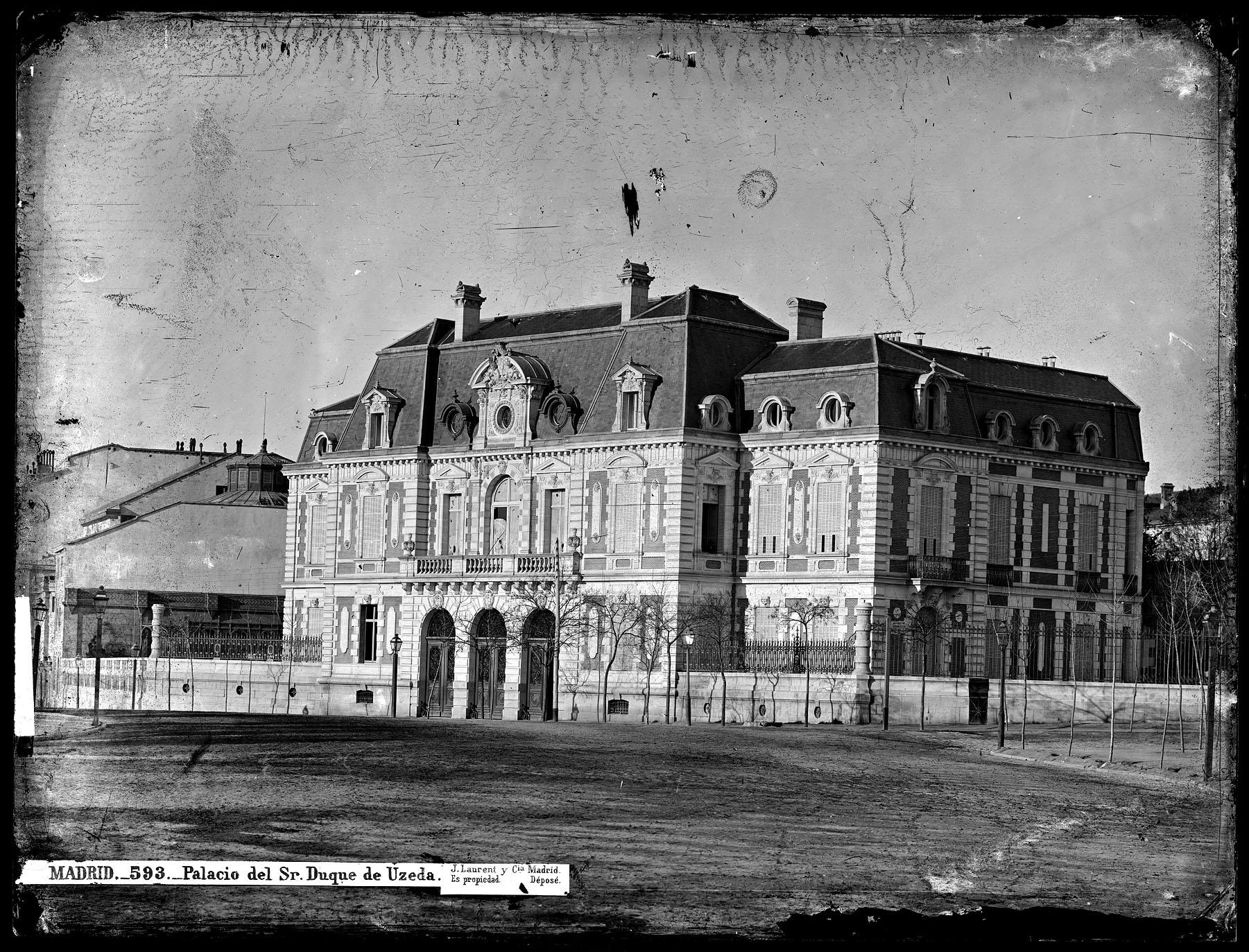
Palace of the Duke of Uceda (later Medinaceli) in Madrid, home of Don Luis, c. 1875

He is buried in the Basilica of Jesús de Medinaceli in Madrid.

== Titles and styles ==
=== Titles ===
==== Dukedoms ====
- 17th Duke of Medinaceli (GE)
- 15th Duke of Alcalá de los Gazules (GE)
- 3rd Duke of Denia (GE)
- 13th Duke of Camiña (GE)
- 19th Duke of Cardona (GE)
- 12th Duke of Ciudad Real (GE)
- 17th Duke of Feria (GE)
- 15th Duke of Lerma (GE)
- 7th Duke of Santisteban del Puerto (GE)
- 17th Duke of Segorbe (GE)
- 3rd Duke of Tarifa (GE)

==== Marquessates ====
- 13th Marquess of Alcalá de la Alameda
- 13th Marquess of Aitona (GE)
- 15th Marquess of Cogolludo
- 16th Marquess of Comares
- 18th Marquess of Denia
- 10th Marquess of Navahermosa
- 16th Marquess of las Navas
- 13th Marquess of Malagón
- 14th Marquess of Montalbán
- 19th Marquess of Pallars
- 16th Marquess of Priego (GE)
- 12th Marquess of Solera
- 18th Marquess of Tarifa

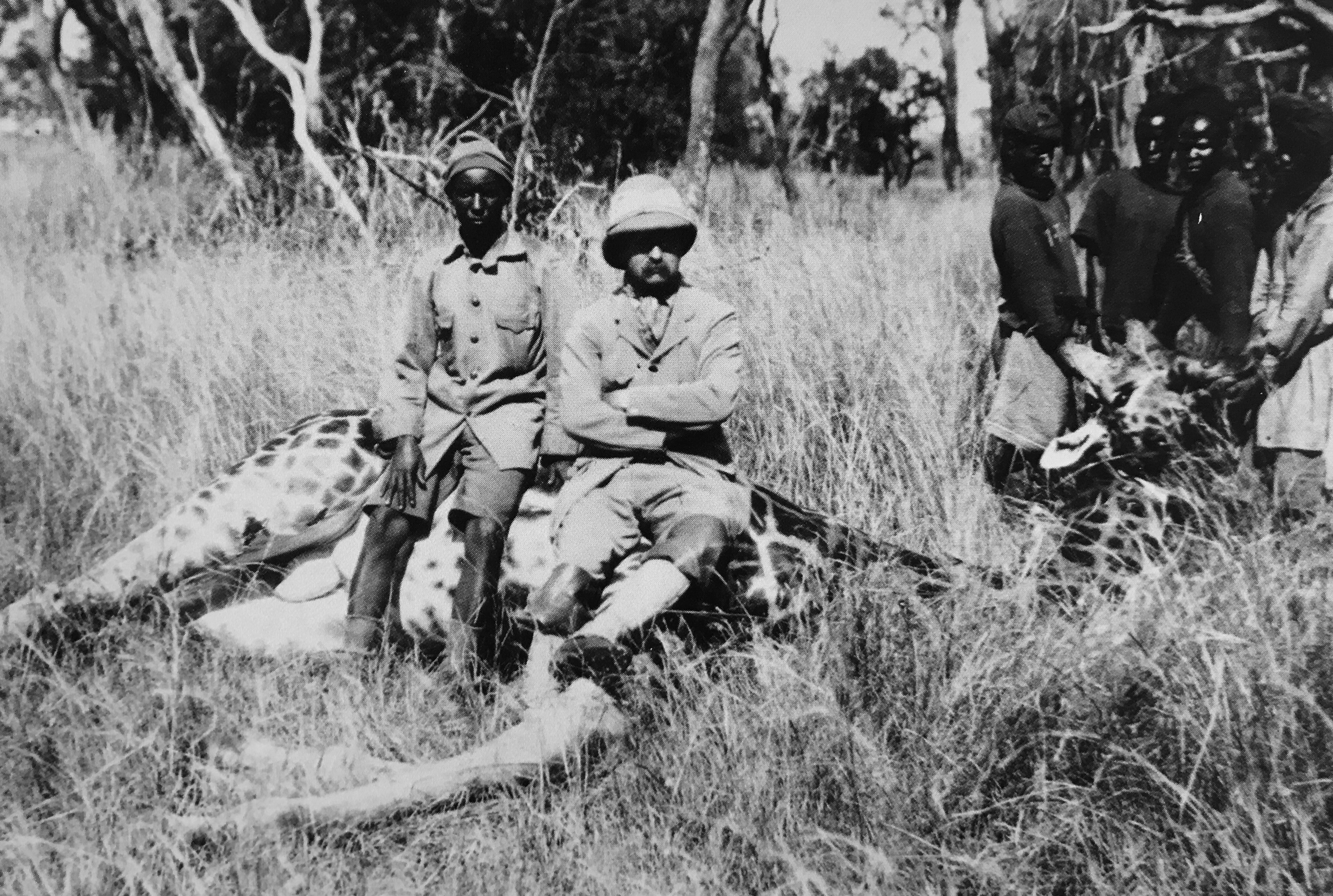
Medinaceli (wearing a pith helmet) poses with his trophy giraffe in British East Africa, 1908

- 10th Marquess of Torrecilla (GE)
- 18th Marquess of Villa Real
- 14th Marquess of Villafranca
- 14th Marquess of Villalba

==== Countships ====
- 18th Count of Alcoutim
- 51st Count of Ampurias
- 12th Count of Aramayona
- 23rd Count of Buendía
- 19th Count of Cocentaina
- 15th Count of Castellar
- 18th Count of Risco
- 18th Count of los Molares
- 18th Count of Medellín
- 7th Count of Ofalia

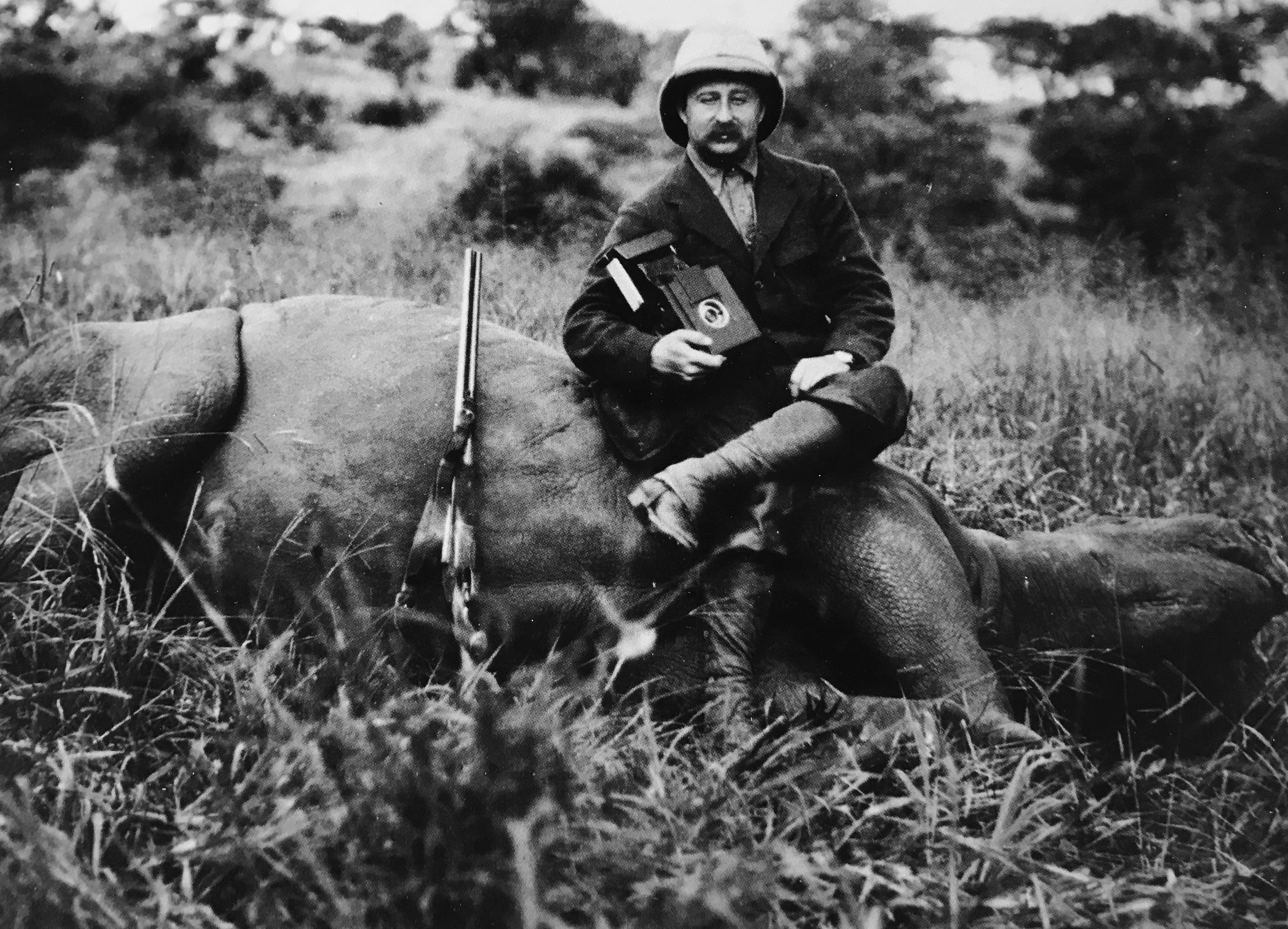
With a buffalo and a Holland & Holland cordite .465 Nitro Express, 1909

- 21st Count of Osona
- 25th Count of Prades
- 16th Count of Santa Gadea (GE)
- 16th Count of Valenza y Valladares
- 13th Count of Villalonso

==== Viscountcies ====
- 45th Viscount of Bas
- 43rd Viscount of Cabrera
- 11th Viscount of Linares
- 41st Viscount of Vilamur

=== Styles ===
- 16 January 1880 – 12 July 1956: The Most Excellent The Duke of Medinaceli

== Selected works ==
- Diario de mi viaje alrededor del mundo en 1907, 1915
- Catálogo de aves europeas de mi colección, 1915
- Cómo cacé la jirafa de mi colección venatoria, 1915
- Expedición ártica en el verano de 1910, 1919
- Notas sobre la cacería en el África oriental inglesa, 1919
- Ballenas, focas y similares, 1924
- Aves de rapiña y su caza, 1927
- Expedición ártica en el verano de 1921, 1929
- La profecía de la bruja, 1940
- El elefante en la Ciencia, la Mitología, la Tradición y la Historia, 1941
- Breve historial de las armas de caza, 1942
- La caza de las aves de rapiña, 1942
- El alce y su caza, 1943
- Las aves de rapiña en la cetrería, 1943

== Arms ==
Heraldry of Luis Fernández de Córdoba, 17th Duke of Medinaceli

Coat of Arms
(1931-1956)

== Ancestors ==
Ancestors of Luis Fernández de Córdoba, 17th Duke of Medinaceli

16. Luis María Fernández de Córdova y Gonzaga, 13th Duke of Medinaceli
8. Luis Joaquín Fernández de Córdoba y Benavides, 14th Duke of Medinaceli
17. Joaquina María de Benavides y Pacheco, 3rd Duchess of Santisteban del Puerto
4. Luis Tomás Fernández de Córdoba y Ponce de León, 15th Duke of Medinaceli
18. Antonio María Ponce de León Dávila y Carrillo de Albornoz, 4th Duke of Montemar
9. María de la Concepción Ponce de León y Carvajal
19. María Luisa de Carvajal y Gonzaga
2. Luis María Fernández de Córdoba y Pérez de Barradas, 16th Duke of Medinaceli
20. Juan Bautista Pérez de Barradas y Pérez de Barradas, 8th Marquess of Peñaflor
10. Fernando Pérez de Barradas y Arias de Saavedra, 9th Marquess of Peñaflor
21. Ángela Arias de Saavedra y Vélez de Guevara
5. Ángela Pérez de Barradas y Bernuy, 1st Duchess of Denia y Tarifa
22. Juan Bautista Bernuy y Valda, 7th Marquess of Benamejí
11. María del Rosario Bernuy y Aguayo
23. María del Carmen Aguayo y Aguayo, 4th Countess of Villaverde la Alta
1. Luis Fernández de Córdoba y Salabert, 17th Duke of Medinaceli
24. Félix María de Salabert y O'Brien, 5th Marquess of Torrecilla
12. Manuel de Salabert y Torres, 6th Marquess of Torrecilla
25. Rosa de Torres y Feloaga
6. Narciso de Salabert y Pinedo, 7th Marquess of Torrecilla
26. Manuel Pinedo e Ibaizábal
13. María Casilda de Pinedo y Huici
27. Ana de Huici y Zailorda
3. Casilda de Salabert y Arteaga, 11th Duchess of Ciudad Real
28. Andrés Avelino de Arteaga y Palafox, 5th Marquess of Valmediano
14. Andrés Avelino de Arteaga y Carvajal Vargas, 6th Marquess of Valmediano
29. Joaquina de Carvajal Vargas y Manrique de Lara
7. María Josefa de Arteaga y Silva
30. José Gabriel de Silva-Bazán y Waldstein, 10th Marquess of Santa Cruz
15. Fernanda María de Silva y Téllez Girón
31. Joaquina Téllez-Girón y Pimentel, 2nd Countess of Osilo

== See also ==
- List of Famous Big Game Hunters
