= Duke of Camiña =

Dukedom of Spain

Dukedom of Camiña
- Creation date: 1619
- Created by: Philip III
- Peerage: Peerage of Spain
- First holder: Miguel de Meneses y Noronha, 1st Duke of Camiña
- Present holder: Victoria de Hohenlohe-Langenburg y Schmidt-Polex, 15th Duchess of Camiña

Duke of Camiña (Spanish: Duque de Camiña) is a hereditary title in the Peerage of Spain accompanied by the dignity of Grandee, granted in 1619 by Philip III to a Portuguese aristocrat, Miguel de Meneses, 2nd Duke of Vila Real in the peerage of Portugal.

The title makes reference to the town of Caminha, Portugal, and was granted originally by Philip III as a title of Portuguese nobility, as he was also king of Portugal. When the two countries were separated, Philip IV of Spain recognised the Dukedom of Camiña as a title in the peerage of Spain.

== Dukes of Camiña (1619) ==
- Miguel de Meneses y Noronha, 1st Duke of Camiña
- Miguel Luis de Meneses y Noronha, 2nd Duke of Camiña
- María Beatriz de Meneses y Noronha, 3rd Duchess of Camiña
- Pedro Damián Portocarrero y Meneses, 4th Duke of Camiña
- Luisa Feliciana Portocarrero y Meneses, 5th Duchess of Camiña
- Guillén Ramón de Moncada y Portocarrero, 6th Duke of Camiña
- María Teresa de Moncada y Benavides, 7th Duchess of Camiña
- Pedro de Alcántara Fernández de Córdoba y Moncada, 8th Duke of Camiña
- Luis María Fernández de Córdoba y Gonzaga, 9th Duke of Camiña
- Luis Joaquín Fernández de Córdoba y Benavides, 10th Duke of Camiña
- Luis Antonio Fernández de Córdoba y Ponce de León, 11th Duke of Camiña
- Luis María Fernández de Córdoba y Pérez de Barradas, 12th Duke of Camiña
- Luis Jesús Fernández de Córdoba y Salabert, 13th Duke of Camiña
- Victoria Eugenia Fernández de Córdoba y Fernández de Henestrosa, 14th Duchess of Camiña
- Victoria de Hohenlohe-Langenburg y Schmidt-Polex, 15th Duchess of Camiña

== See also ==
- List of dukes in the peerage of Spain
- List of current grandees of Spain
