= Duke of Tarifa =

Dukedom of Spain

Dukedom of Tarifa
- Creation date: 28 June 1886
- Created by: Alfonso XII
- Peerage: Peerage of Spain
- First holder: Ángela María Apolonia Pérez de Barradas y Bernuy, 1st Duchess of Tarifa
- Present holder: Victoria Elisabeth Hohenlohe-Langenburg y Schmidt-Polex, 5th Duchess of Tarifa

Duke of Tarifa (Spanish: Duque de Tarifa), is an hereditary title in the peerage of Spain, accompanied by the dignity of Grandee. It was granted to Ángela Maria Apolonia Pérez de Barradas y Bernuy on 28 June 1886 by king Alfonso XII. The tile was originally granted as "Duke of Denia and Tarifa" (duque de Denia y Tarifa) but was separated into two different titles on 22 December 1886 by the Queen Regent, Maria Christina of Austria.

== Dukes of Denia y Tarifa (1886) ==
- Ángela María Apolonia Pérez de Barradas y Bernuy, 1st Duchess of Denia y Tarifa (1827-1903)

== Dukes of Tarifa (1886) ==
- Ángela María Apolonia Pérez de Barradas y Bernuy, 1st Duchess of Tarifa (1827-1903)
- Carlos María de Constantinopla Fernández de Córdoba y Pérez de Barradas, 2nd Duke of Tarifa (1864-1931), son of the 1st Duchess
- Luis Fernández de Córdoba y Salabert, 3rd Duke of Tarifa (1880-1956), grandson of the 1st Duchess
- Victoria Eugenia Fernández de Córdoba y Fernández de Henestrosa, 4th Duchess of Tarifa (1917-2013), daughter of the 3rd Duke
- Princess Victoria Elisabeth of Hohenlohe-Langenburg, 5th Duchess of Tarifa (b. 1997), great-granddaughter of the 4th Duchess

== See also ==
- Duke of Denia
- List of dukes in the peerage of Spain
- List of current grandees of Spain
