= Duke of Denia =

Dukedom of Spain

Dukedom of Denia
- Creation date: 28 June 1886
- Created by: Alfonso XII
- Peerage: Peerage of Spain
- First holder: Ángela María Apolonia Pérez de Barradas y Bernuy, 1st Duchess of Denia
- Present holder: Victoria Elisabeth Hohenlohe-Langenburg y Schmidt-Polex, 5th Duchess of Denia

Duke of Denia (Spanish: Duque de Denia), is an hereditary title in the peerage of Spain, accompanied by the dignity of Grandee. It was granted to Ángela Maria Apolonia Pérez de Barradas y Bernuy on 28 June 1886 by king Alfonso XII. The tile was originally granted as "Duke of Denia and Tarifa" (duque de Denia y Tarifa) but was separated into two different titles on 22 December 1886 by the Queen Regent, Maria Christina of Austria.

== Dukes of Denia y Tarifa (1886) ==
- Ángela María Apolonia Pérez de Barradas y Bernuy, 1st Duchess of Denia y Tarifa

== Dukes of Denia (1886) ==
- Ángela María Apolonia Pérez de Barradas y Bernuy, 1st Duchess of Denia
- Carlos María de Constantinopla Fernández de Córdoba y Pérez de Barradas, 2nd Duke of Denia
- Luis Fernández de Córdoba y Salabert, 3rd Duke of Denia
- Victoria Eugenia Fernández de Córdoba y Fernández de Henestrosa, 4th Duchess of Denia
- Victoria Elisabeth Hohenlohe-Langenburg y Schmidt-Polex, 5th Duchess of Denia

== See also ==
- Duke of Tarifa
- List of dukes in the peerage of Spain
- List of current grandees of Spain
