= Victoria Eugenia Fernández de Córdoba, 18th Duchess of Medinaceli =

Spanish noblewoman

The Most Excellent Victoria Eugenia Fernández de Córdoba
- Grandee of Spain (more...)

Duchess of Medinaceli
- Reign: 13 July 1956 – 18 August 2013
- Predecessor: Luis Fernández de Córdoba, 17th Duke of Medinaceli
- Successor: Prince Marco of Hohenlohe-Langenburg, 19th Duke of Medinaceli
- Full name: María Victoria Eugenia Fernández de Córdoba, Fernández de Henestrosa, Salabert y Gayoso de los Cobos
- Born: 16 April 1917; Medinaceli Palace, Madrid, Spain
- Died: 18 August 2013 (aged 96); Pilatos Palace, Seville, Spain
- Buried: Tavera Hospital, Toledo, Spain
- Family: House of Medinaceli; House of Cordoba
- Spouse: Rafael Medina y Vilallonga (m. 1938; d. 1992)
- Issue: Ana Luisa de Medina, 12th Marquise of Navahermosa; Luis de Medina, 9th Duke of Santisteban del Puerto; Rafael de Medina, 19th Duke of Feria; Ignacio de Medina, 19th Duke of Segorbe
- Father: Luis Fernández de Córdoba, 17th Duke of Medinaceli
- Mother: Ana María Fernández de Henestrosa y Gayoso de los Cobos

Doña Victoria Eugenia Fernández de Córdoba y Fernández de Henestrosa, 18th Duchess of Medinaceli, GE (pronounced [biɣˈtoɾja ewˈxenja feɾˈnandeθ ðe ˈkoɾðoβaj feɾˈnandeθ ðe enesˈtɾosa]; 16 April 1917 – 18 August 2013) was a Spanish noblewoman and Grandee of Spain. She was the head of the Spanish noble House of Medinaceli and patron of the Ducal House of Medinaceli Foundation. In addition to her most senior title of Duchess of Medinaceli, she held an additional 49 other hereditary noble titles during her lifetime, making her the second-most titled noblewoman in Spain, just after Cayetana Fitz-James Stuart, 18th Duchess of Alba. She died in Seville on 18 August 2013, aged 96.

== Background ==
Doña Victoria was born as the eldest daughter of Don Luis Jesús Fernández de Córdoba y Salabert, 17th Duke of Medinaceli, and Doña Ana María Fernández de Henestrosa y Gayoso de los Cobos. She was baptized in the Royal Chamber of the Royal Palace of Madrid, with Queen Victoria Eugenie and King Alfonso XIII of Spain serving as her godparents. She was named after the Queen. She was known by the nickname Mimí to her family and close friends.

She married Rafael de Medina y Vilallonga in 1938, and she succeeded to the dukedom in 1956, upon her father's death. Before that, she was styled as 16th Duchess of Alcalá de los Gazules, a courtesy title granted by her father. She was the second-most titled noblewoman in Spain, and holder of one of its most ancient dukedoms.

In 1980, the Duchess established the Ducal House of Medinaceli Foundation, which manages the Casa de Pilatos in Seville, her principal residence, as well as the Hospital de San Juan Bautista in Toledo and the Palacio de Oca in Galicia.

== Marriage and issue ==
The Duchess married, on 12 January 1938 in Seville, Rafael de Medina y Vilallonga, Knight of the Real Maestranza de Caballería de Sevilla and Mayor of Seville from 1943–47. The Duke was the son of Luis de Medina y Garvey, a son of the 4th Marquis of Esquivel, and Amelia de Vilallonga e Ybarra. They had 4 children:

- Doña Ana Luisa de Medina y Fernández de Córdoba, 12th Marquise of Navahermosa (b. 2 May 1940 - d. 7 March 2012), who married firstly at Seville, the 3 June 1961, Prince Maximilian Emmanuel of Hohenlohe-Langenburg, of the Hohenlohe princely family, brother of Prince Alfonso of Hohenlohe-Langenburg. Divorced in 1982, she married secondly, in 1985, Jaime de Urzáiz y Fernández del Castillo, Minister of Culture. Children from her first marriage:
  - Prince Marco of Hohenlohe-Langenburg, 19th Duke of Medinaceli (b. 8 March 1962 - d. 19 August 2016), married at Ronda, on 1 June 1996, Sandra Schmidt-Polex, daughter of Hans Carl Schmidt-Polex and Karin Goepfer, having issue.
  - Prince Pablo of Hohenlohe-Langenburg (b. 5 March 1963), married at Tavera Monastery, Toledo on 6 June 2002, María del Prado y Muguiro, daughter of Juan Carlos del Prado, 11th Marquis of Caicedo, and Teresa de Muguiro y Pidal, having issue.
  - Princess Flavia of Hohenlohe-Langenburg (b. 9 March 1964), married at Seville, on 10 November 1990, her second cousin José Luis de Vilallonga y Sanz, having issue.
- Don Luis de Medina y Fernández de Córdoba, 9th Duke of Santisteban del Puerto, Grandee of Spain (b. 4 June 1941 - d. 9 Feb 2011), who married at Seville, on 1 December 1985, Mercedes Conradi y Ramírez. Daughters:
  - Doña Victoria Francisca de Medina y Conradi y Ramírez (b. 4 October 1986), 10th Duchess of Santisteban del Puerto, Grandee of Spain, married at Sevilla in 2014, Miguel José Coca y Barrionuevo.
  - Doña Casilda de Medina y Conradi y Ramírez (b. 16 May 1989), 16th Marchioness of Solera.
- Don Rafael de Medina y Fernández de Córdoba, 19th Duke of Feria, Grandee of Spain (b. 10 August 1942 - d. 5 August 2001), married at the Hermitage of El Rocío, Almonte, Natividad Abascal y Romero-Toro (divorced in 1989). Children:
  - Don Rafael de Medina, 20th Duke of Feria, Grandee of Spain (b. 25 September 1978).
  - Don Luis de Medina y Abascal (b. 31 August 1980).
- Don Ignacio de Medina y Fernández de Córdoba, 19th Duke of Segorbe, Grandee of Spain (b. 23 February 1947), married at Seville, on 24 October 1985, Princess Maria da Glória of Orléans-Braganza, daughter of Prince Pedro Gastão of Orléans-Braganza and wife Princess Maria de la Esperanza of Bourbon-Two Sicilies and ex-wife of Alexander, Crown Prince of Yugoslavia. Daughters:
  - Doña Sol María de la Blanca de Medina y Orléans-Braganza, 54th Countess of Ampurias (b. 8 August 1986), married Pedro Domínguez-Manjón y Toro (of the Barons de Gracia Real) on 4 June 2023.
  - Doña Ana Luna de Medina y Orléans-Braganza, 17th Countess of Ricla (b. 4 May 1988), married Giovanni Michele Rapazzini de' Buzzaccarini (born 1993).

== Titles ==
Victoria Eugenia Fernández de Córdoba held a total of 50 hereditary noble titles during her lifetime, 14 of which accompanied by the dignity of Grandee.

=== Dukedoms ===
Ducal arms of Medinaceli

- 18th Duchess of Medinaceli, Grandee of Spain
- 18th Duchess of Segorbe, Grandee of Spain -Ceded to her son Don Ignacio
- 16th Duchess of Alcalá de los Gazules, Grandee of Spain
- 18th Duchess of Feria, Grandee of Spain -Ceded to her son Don Rafael
- 12th Duchess of Camiña, Grandee of Spain
- 8th Duchess of Santisteban del Puerto, Grandee of Spain -Ceded to her son Don Luis
- 13th Duchess of Ciudad Real, Grandee of Spain
- 4th Duchess of Denia, Grandee of Spain
- 4th Duchess of Tarifa, Grandee of Spain

=== Marquessates ===
- 17th Marchioness of Priego, Grandee of Spain
- 17th Marchioness of Camarasa, Grandee of Spain
- 14th Marchioness of Aitona, Grandee of Spain
- 11th Marchioness of la Torrecilla, Grandee of Spain
- 17th Marchioness of Denia
- 20th Marchioness of Pallars
- 17th Marchioness of Comares
- 19th Marchioness of Tarifa
- 17th Marchioness of las Navas
- 15th Marchioness of Villalba -Ceded to her son Don Rafael
- 14th Marchioness of Alcalá de la Alameda
- 15th Marchioness of Villafranca
- 14th Marchioness of Malagón
- 15th Marchioness of Montalbán
- 13th Marchioness of Solera -Ceded to her son Don Luis
- 11th Marchioness of Navahermosa -Ceded to her daughter Doña Ana
- 14th Marchioness of Cilleruelo
- 9th Marchioness of San Miguel das Penas and la Mota

=== Countships ===
- 17th Countess of Santa Gadea, Grandee of Spain
- 52nd Countess of Ampurias -Ceded to her son Don Ignacio
- 26th Countess of Prades
- 22nd Countess of Osona
- 22nd Countess of Castrojeriz
- 20th Countess of Cocentaina
- 19th Countess of Medellín
- 19th Countess of the Risco
- 24th Countess of Buendía
- 19th Countess of the Molares, Adelantada Mayor of Andalusia
- 14th Countess of Villalonso
- 16th Countess of Castellar
- 15th Countess of Ricla -Ceded to her son Don Ignacio
- 14th Countess of Aramayona
- 15th Countess of Amarante
- 12th Countess of Alcoutim
- 12th Countess of Valenza and Valladares
- 10th Countess of Moriana del Río -Ceded to her son Don Luis
- 8th Countess of Ofalia -Ceded to her daughter Doña Ana

=== Viscountcies ===
- 46th Viscountess of Bas
- 44th Viscountess of Cabrera
- 42nd Viscountess of Vilamur
- 12th Viscountess of Linares

== See also ==
- Medinaceli

Victoria Eugenia Fernández de Córdoba House of Medinaceli Born: 16 April 1917 Died: 18 August 2013
Spanish nobility
| Preceded by Luis Fernández de Córdoba | Duchess of Medinaceli, etc. 1956-2013 | Succeeded by Prince Marco of Hohenlohe-Langenburg |
| Preceded by Luis Fernández de Córdoba | Duchess of Feria; Marchioness of Villalba; 1956-1969 | Succeeded by Rafael de Medina y Fernández de Córdoba |
| Preceded by Luis Fernández de Córdoba | Duchess of Santisteban del Puerto; Marchioness of Solero; 1956-1969 | Succeeded by Luis de Medina y Fernández de Córdoba |
| Preceded by Luis Fernández de Córdoba | Duchess of Segorbe; Countess of Ampurias; Countess of Ricla; Countess of Moriana del Río; 1956-1969 | Succeeded by Ignacio de Medina y Fernández de Córdoba |
| Preceded by Luis Fernández de Córdoba | Marchioness of Navahermosa; Countess of Ofalia; 1956-1969 | Succeeded by Ana de Medina y Fernández de Córdoba |
