= Basilica of Jesus de Medinaceli =

Church, specifically a basilica, in Madrid, Spain

Coordinates: 40°24′51″N 3°41′44″W

The Basilica of Jesus de Medinaceli or the full name in Spanish: Basílica de Nuestro Padre Jesús de Medinaceli is a Roman Catholic church, specifically a basilica, located in central Madrid.

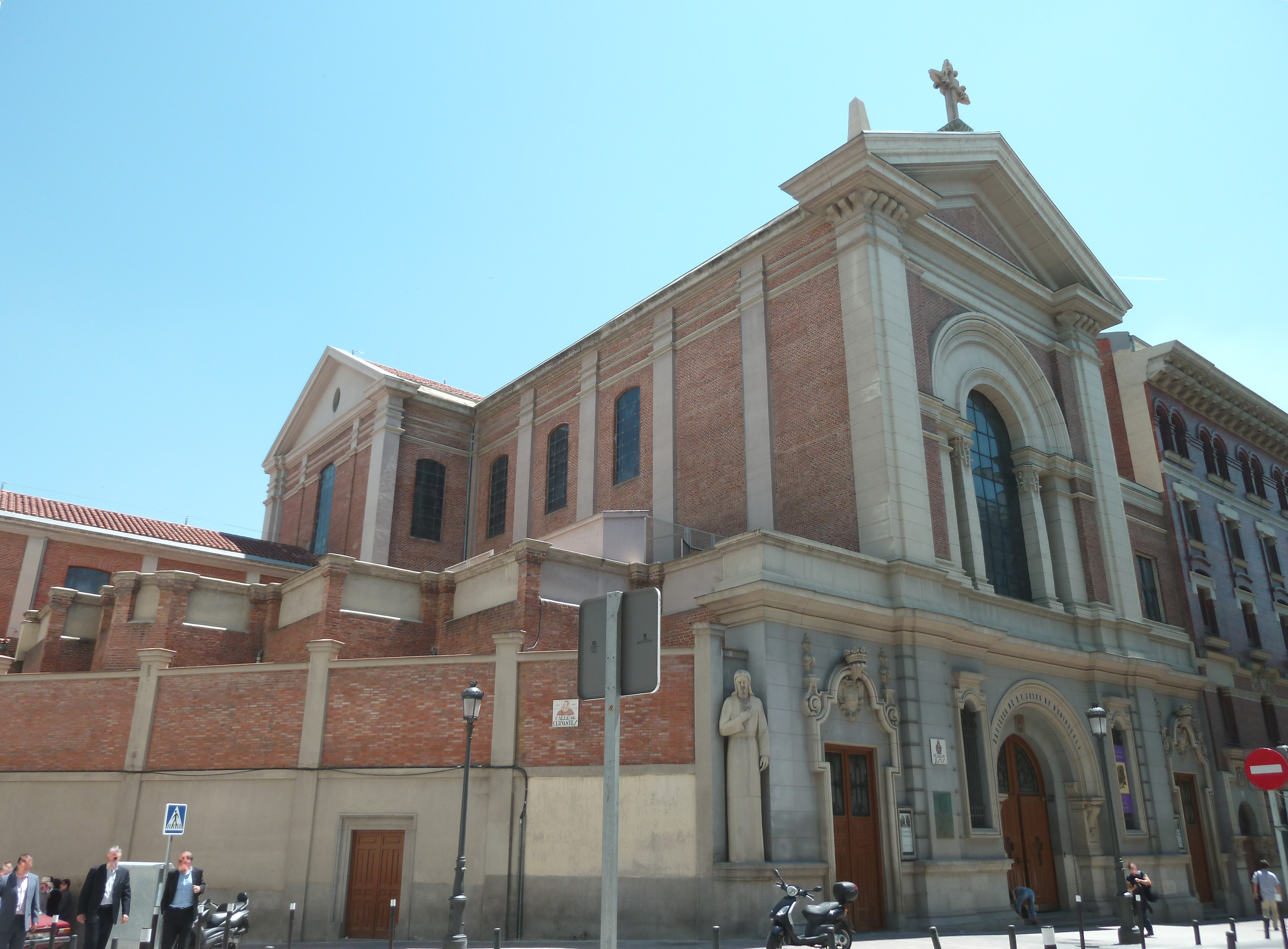
Basílica de Jesús de Medinaceli

== History ==
The church was consecrated in 1930. It was built around a statue of Padre Jesús Nazareno (Father Jesus of Nazareth), which was originally sculpted in 17th century Seville, and had been sent to a Spanish fortress in Morocco. There it was captured by the locals, and ransomed from the Moors by the Trinitarian friars, and housed in the Convent of the Trinitarios Descalzos (Barefoot Trinitarians). The icon created great devotion, and in 1689, the 8th Duke of Medinaceli erected a chapel for the statue. In 1710, a lay fraternity was founded called the Congregation of Slaves of Jesús Nazareno. In 1890, when the convent of the Capuchins was being dismantled, the mother of the 17th Duke of Medinaceli, Doña Casilda Salabert y Arteaga, the 9th Marchioness of Torrecilla, decided to erect a church. From then, the fraternity takes the title of "Cristo de Medinaceli". In 1928, the group was elevated to a primary archconfraternity by the Pope Pius XI. The image almost did not survive the Spanish Civil War, and the survival of the icon, despite its difficulties, has augmented its veneration.

== See also ==
- Catholic Church in Spain
- List of oldest church buildings
