= Casa de Pilatos =

Andalusian palace in Seville, Spain

Coordinates: 37.3899°N 5.98711°W

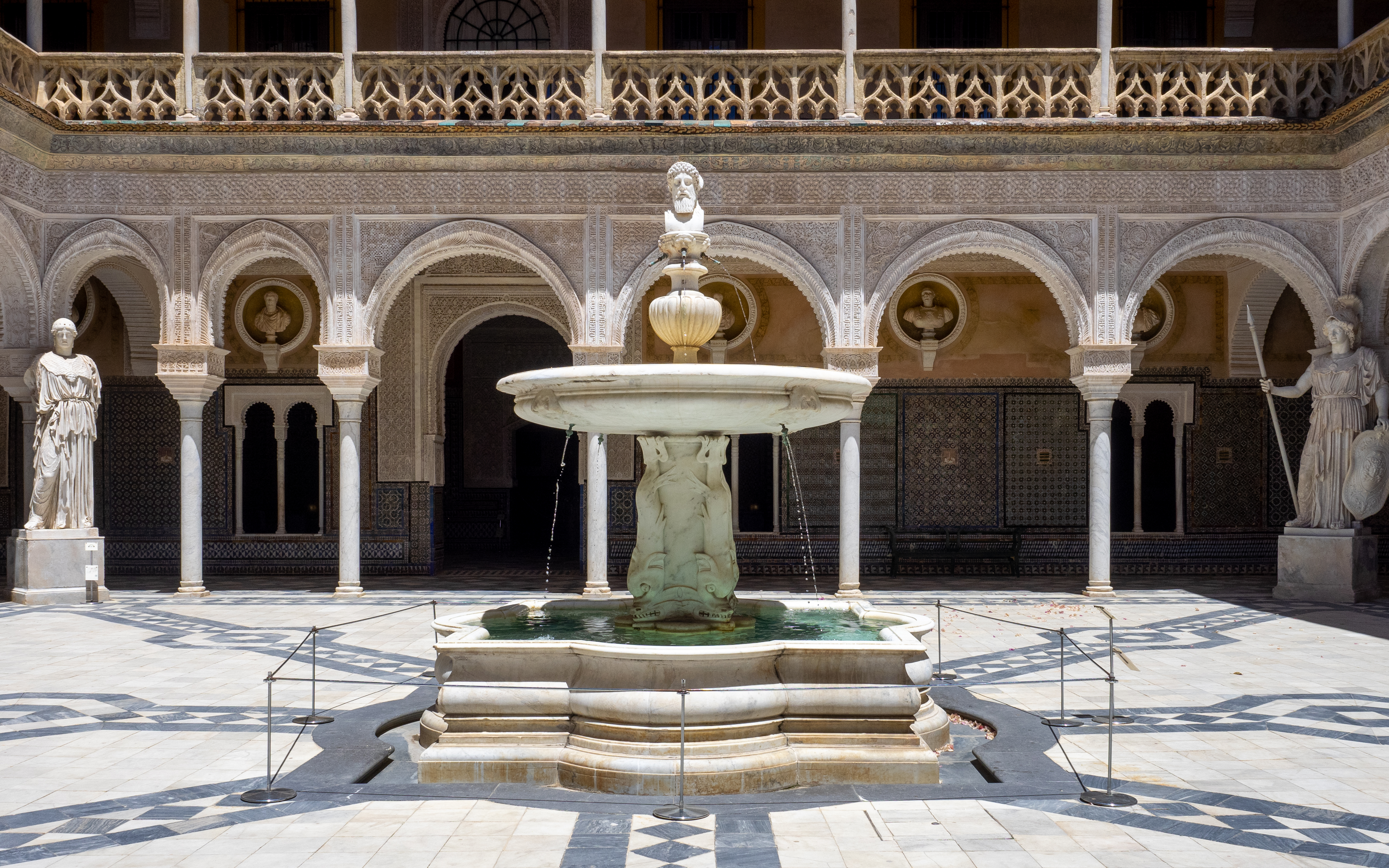
The palace has a collection of statues, most notably twenty-five busts from ancient Rome, one from ancient Greece dating from 5th century BC, and a 16th-century depiction of Charles V.

La Casa de Pilatos (Pilate's House) is an Andalusian palace in Seville, Spain, which serves as the permanent residence of the Dukes of Medinaceli. It is an example of an Italian Renaissance building with Mudéjar elements and decorations. It is considered the prototype of the Andalusian palace.

The Casa de Pilatos has around 150 different azulejo (Spanish glazed tile) designs made in the 1530s by the brothers Diego and Juan Pulido, one of the largest early-modern azulejo collections in the world.

== History ==
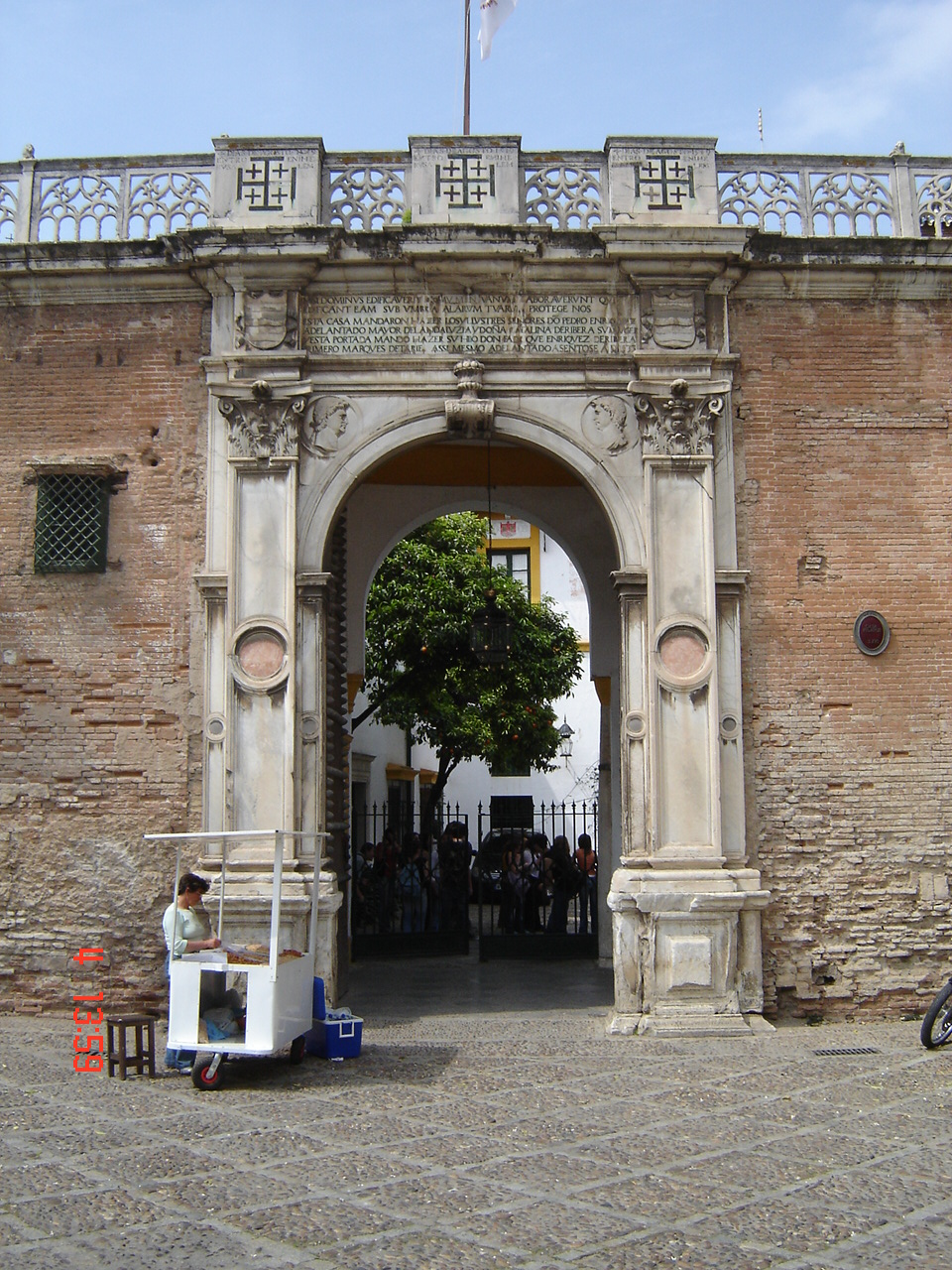
Main gate

The construction of this palace, which is adorned with precious azulejo tiles and well-kept gardens, was begun in 1483 by Pedro Enríquez de Quiñones, Adelantado Mayor of Andalucía, and his wife Catalina de Rivera, founder of the Casa de Alcalá, and completed by Pedro's son Fadrique Enríquez de Rivera (first Marquis of Tarifa), whose pilgrimage to Jerusalem in 1519 led to the building being given the name "Pilate's House".

On 20 October 1520, Don Fadrique returned from a trip through Europe and the Holy Land. During Lent in 1521, he inaugurated the observance in Seville of the Holy Via Crucis (Holy Way of the Cross). The route began in the Chapel of the Flagellations of his palace and ended at a pillar located not far from the Templete, or Cruz del Campo (The Cross of the Field) located outside the city walls. This route ran the same distance of 1321 paces supposed to have separated the praetorium of Pontius Pilate from Calvary. The Marquis's palace, the Palacio de San Andrés, was then still partly under construction; it later became known as the Casa de Pilatos through its association with the Vía Crucis, and was much altered over the next few centuries. Popular imagination has since mistakenly identified the palace as a copy of the house of Pilate; thus the rooms have been named along the theme of the Passion of Christ: "Hall of the Praetorian", "Chapel of the Flagellations", etc. It was declared a National Monument in 1931. The oldest documentation of the name Casa de Pilatos is from 1754.

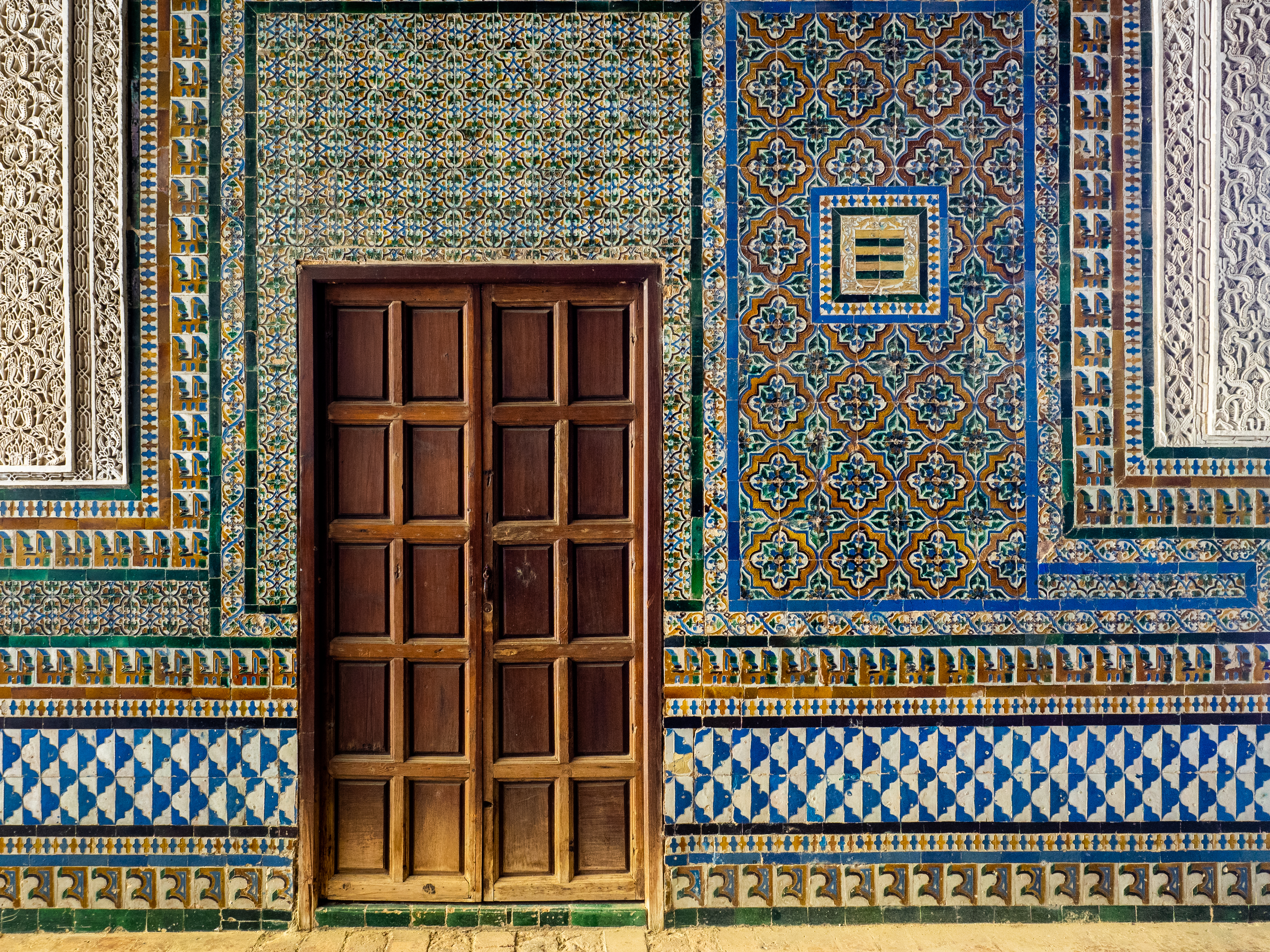
Old azulejos through the palace

In the 16th century, under the orders of Pedro Afán de Ribera, viceroy of Naples, the architect Benvenuto Tortello was responsible for rebuilding the palace leaving the old Mudéjar rooms intact.

== Floor plan ==
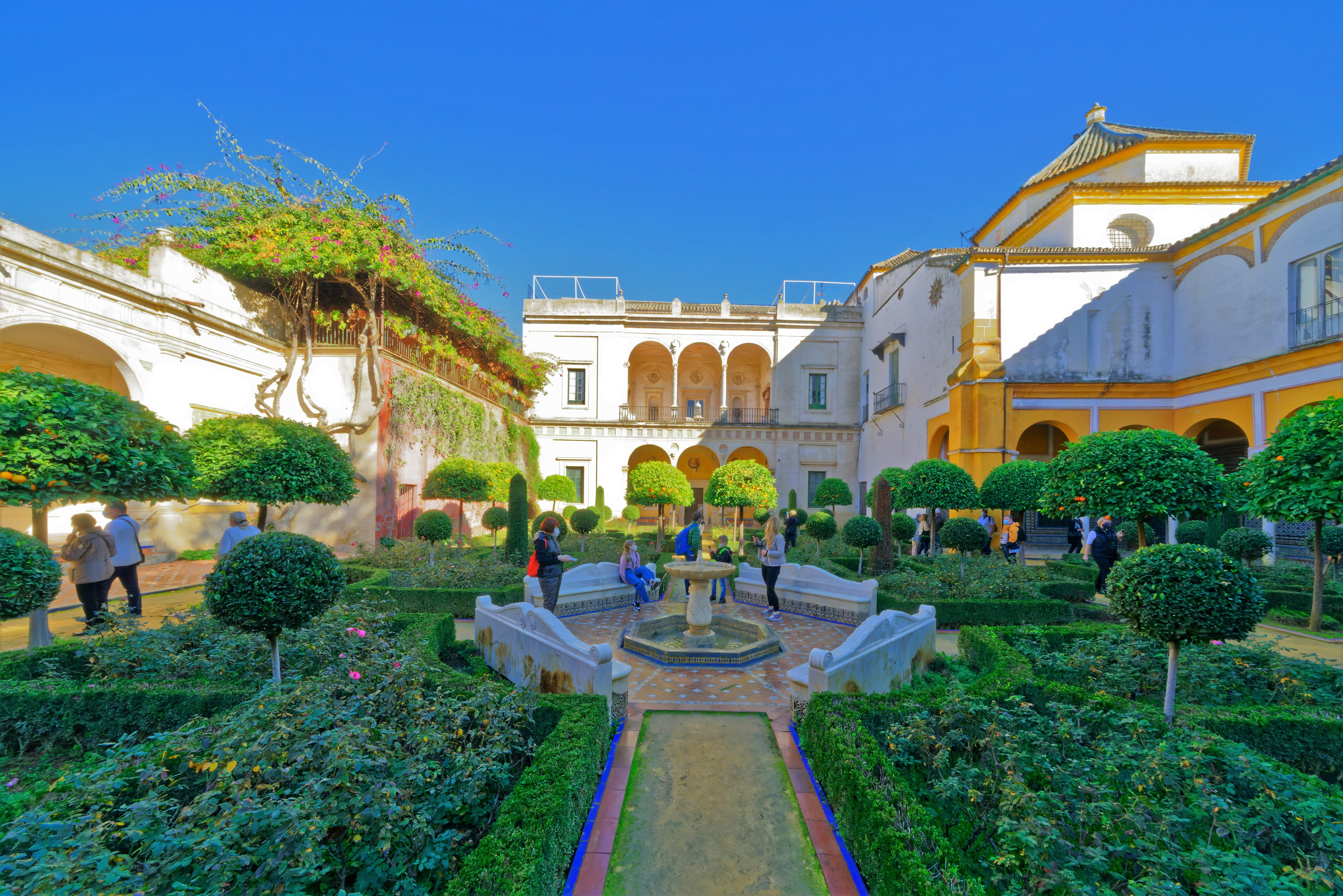
The two 16th-century tiled gardens made by Neapolitan Benvenuto Tortello; both gardens suffered renovations in 19th century.

The palace is accessed through a Renaissance-style marble gate, designed by the Genoese Antonio Maria Aprile in 1529, and surmounted by a Gothic crest, possibly brought from the palace that developers were building in Bornos. The gate leads to a typical Andalusian courtyard with a fountain, and surrounded by twenty-four busts of Spanish kings, Roman emperors and other relevant characters collected from the ruins of the Roman colony of Italica distributed along the lower galleries of the courtyard. The courtyard, in turn, leads to two gardens with plateresque adornments.

A staircase to the top floor is decorated with azulejo tiling and a ceiling of Mudéjar honeycomb, made by Cristobal Sanchez. The rooms on this floor include major paintings dating from the 16th to the 19th centuries, including the Pietà by Sebastiano del Piombo.

In the room to the left wing of the Tower the ceiling displays frescoes painted by Francisco Pacheco between 1603 and 1604 showing the apotheosis of Hercules, and in the room that follows the Tower is a small painting by Francisco Goya of a bullfight, then a still life by Giuseppe Recco in the dining room and a table representing Mary Magdalene painted in the sixteenth century; in the library are three works by painter Luca Giordano. As with most palaces of the period, the Casa de Pilatos also has a chapel, designed in a fusion of the Gothic and Mudéjar styles, with antique decor and numerous manuscripts. The Casa de Pilatos is considered one of the finest examples of Andalusian architecture of 16th-century Seville. The house is open to the public year-round.

== Film location ==
Several films have been shot in the Casa de Pilatos, including Lawrence of Arabia in 1962, and Ridley Scott's 1492: Conquest of Paradise in 1992, and Kingdom of Heaven in 2005. At the end of 2009, Tom Cruise filmed the movie Knight and Day with Cameron Diaz at the palace.

== See also ==
- Architecture of the Spanish Renaissance
- Spanish Renaissance
