= Max von Hohenlohe =

- Prince of Hohenlohe-Langenburg
- Born: Maximilian Emanuel Maria Alexander Victor Bruno de la Santísima Trinidad y Todos los Santos zu Hohenlohe-Langenburg; 6 October 1931; Vienna, Austria
- Died: 1 December 1994 (aged 63); Marbella, Spain
- Burial: Cemetery of Saint Barnabas, Marbella, Spain
- Spouse: Ana Luisa de Medina y Fernández de Córdoba (m. 1961)
- Issue: Prince Marco of Hohenlohe-Langenburg; Prince Pablo of Hohenlohe-Langenburg; Princess Flavia of Hohenlohe-Langenburg
- House: House of Hohenlohe-Langenburg
- Father: Prince Max Egon zu Hohenlohe-Langenburg
- Mother: Doña María de la Piedad de Yturbe von Scholtz-Hermensdorff, 3rd Marquesa de Belvís de las Navas
- Religion: Catholicism

Prince Maximilian Emanuel Maria Alexander Victor Bruno de la Santísima Trinidad y Todos los Santos zu Hohenlohe-Langenburg (6 October 1931 – 1 December 1994) was a Liechtensteiner alpine skier who competed in the 1956 Winter Olympics.

== Personal life ==
Being a son of Prince Max Egon of Hohenlohe-Langenburg (1897-1968) and Doña María de la Piedad de Yturbe von Scholtz-Hermensdorff, 3rd Marquesa de Belvís de las Navas (1892-1990), he was brother of Prince Alfonso of Hohenlohe-Langenburg, and thus uncle of Prince Hubertus of Hohenlohe-Langenburg who has skied for the Mexican Olympic team at multiple winter games.

In 1961, he married Ana Luisa de Medina y Fernández de Córdoba, 12th Marquesa de Navahermosa (1940−2012), the eldest child of Victoria Eugenia Fernández de Córdoba, 18th Duchess of Medinaceli. They had 3 children and divorced in 1982:

- Prince Marco of Hohenlohe-Langenburg (8 March 1962 - 19 August 2016), married in Ronda, 1 June 1996, with Sandra Schmidt-Polex, with issue; became 19th Duke of Medinaceli in 2014.
- Prince Pablo of Hohenlohe-Langenburg (b. 5 March 1963), married in Tavera Monastery, Toledo, 6 June 2002, with María del Prado y Muguiro, daughter of Juan Carlos del Prado, 11th Marquis of Caicedo, and Teresa de Muguiro y Pidal, with issue;
- Princess Flavia of Hohenlohe-Langenburg (b. 9 March 1964), married in Seville, 10 November 1990, with her second cousin José Luis de Vilallonga y Sanz, with issue.

== Ancestry ==
Ancestors of Max von Hohenlohe

8. Prince Louis of Hohenlohe-Langenburg
4. Prince Gottfried of Hohenlohe-Langenburg
9. Countess Gabriele von Trauttmansdorff-Weinsberg
2. Prince Max Egon of Hohenlohe-Langenburg
10. Erwin, Count von Schönborn-Buchheim
5. Countess Anna von Schönborn-Buchheim
11. Countess Franziska von Trauttmansdorff-Weinsberg
1. Prince Max Emanuel of Hohenlohe-Langenburg
12. Francisco María de Yturbe y Anciola
6. Manuel Adrián de Yturbe y del Villar
13. Cipriana del Villar y Baquero
3. María de la Piedad de Yturbe y von Scholtz-Hersmendorff, Marquesa de Belvís de las Navas
14. Enrique von Scholtz-Hermensdorff y Caravaca, Marques de Belvís de las Navas
7. María de la Trinidad von Scholtz-Hermensdorff y Caravaca, Marquesa de Belvís de las Navas
15. María Carlota de Behr y Grund

== See also ==
- List of royal Olympians
