= Marquess of Navahermosa =

Marquessate of Navahermosa
- Creation date: 2 August 1683
- Created by: Charles II
- Peerage: Peerage of Spain
- First holder: Juan de Feloaga y Ponce de León, 1st Marquess of Navahermosa
- Present holder: Alexander Gonzalo de Hohenlohe-Langenburg y Schmidt-Polex, 13th Marquess of Navahermosa

Marquess of Navahermosa (Spanish: Marqués de Navahermosa) is a hereditary title in the Peerage of Spain, granted in 1683 by Charles II to Juan de Feloaga, knight of the Order of Santiago and member of the Council of Finance.

== Marquesses of Navahermosa (1683) ==
- Juan de Feloaga y Ponce de León, 1st Marquess of Navahermosa (1683-1702)
- Francisco de Feloaga y Vargas, 2nd Marquess of Navahermosa (1702-1736)
- José de Feloaga y Vargas, 3rd Marquess of Navahermosa (1736-?)
- Juan Félix de Feloaga y Vargas, 4th Marquess of Navahermosa (?-1756)
- Alejo de Feloaga y López de Zárate, 5th Marquess of Navahermosa (1756-?)
- Félix de Feloaga y Gaytán, 6th Marquess of Navahermosa
- Manuel de Salabert y Torres, 7th Marquess of Navahermosa (?-1834)
- Narciso de Salabert y Pinedo, 8th Marquess of Navahermosa (1834-1885)
- Casilda Remigia de Salabert y Arteaga, 9th Marchioness of Navahermosa (1885-1936)
- Luis Fernández de Córdoba y Salabert, 10th Marquess of Navahermosa (1952-1956)
- Victoria Eugenia Fernández de Córdoba y Fernández de Henestrosa, 11th Marchioness of Navahermosa (1958-1969)
- Ana Luisa de Medina y Fernández de Córdoba, 12th Marchioness of Navahermosa (1969-2012)
- Alexander Gonzalo de Hohenlohe-Langenburg y Schmidt-Polex, 13th Marquess of Navahermosa (2016-present)

== See also ==
- Duke of Ciudad Real
