= Camarasa =

- Municipality
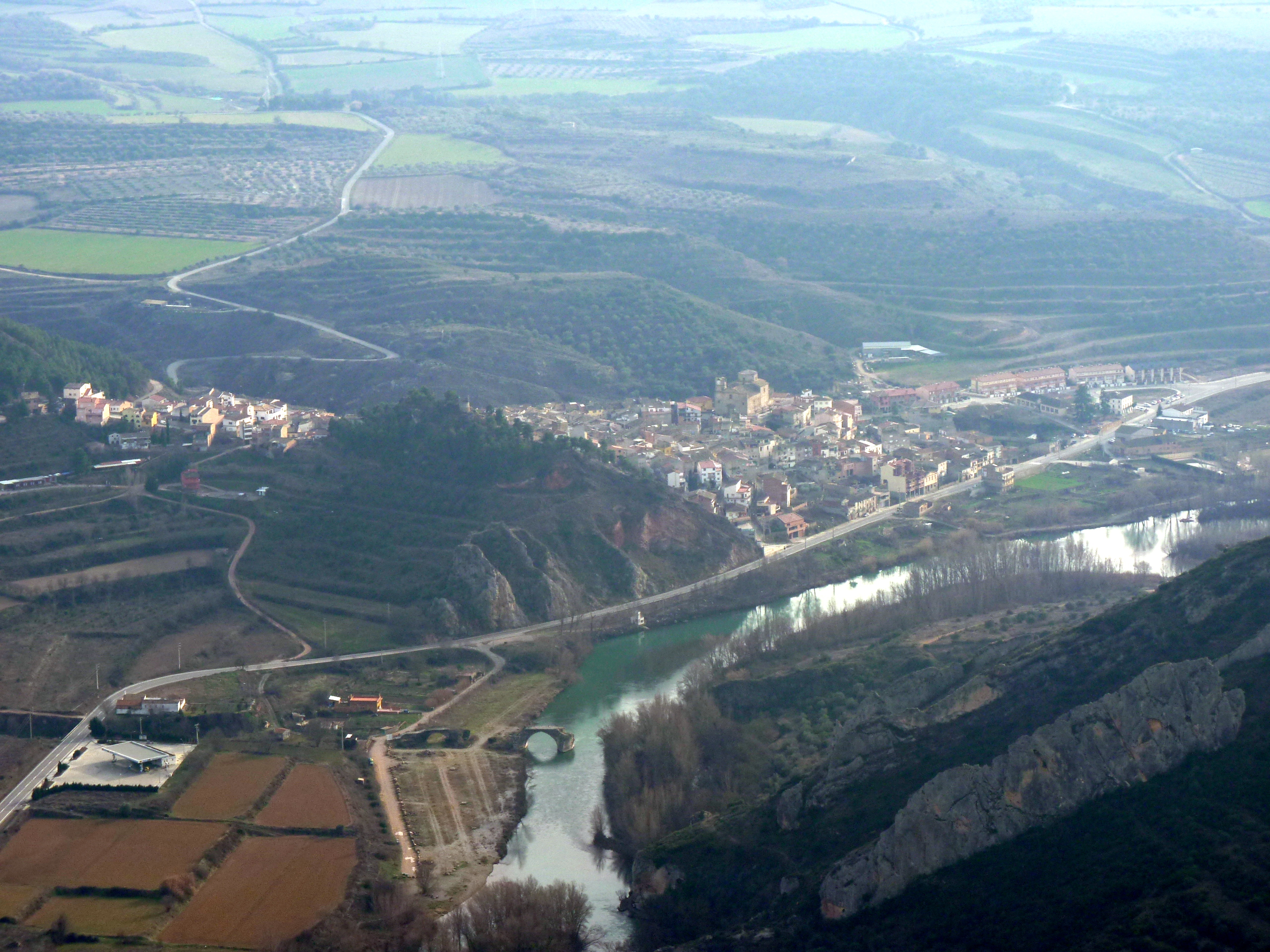
- Camarasa

- Coat of arms

- Location in Catalonia
- Coordinates: 41.876°N 0.878°E
- Country: Spain
- Community: Catalonia
- Province: Lleida
- Comarca: La Noguera

Government
  - Mayor: Elisabet Lizaso Cantón (2015)

Area
  - Total: 157.1 km^{2} (60.7 sq mi)
- Elevation: 321 m (1,053 ft)

Population (2025-01-01)
  - Total: 788
  - Density: 5.02/km^{2} (13.0/sq mi)
- Demonym(s): Camarasí, Camarasina
- Website: www.ccnoguera.cat/camarasa

Camarasa (Catalan pronunciation: [kamaˈɾaza]) is a municipality in the comarca of the Noguera in Catalonia, Spain. It is situated at the confluence of the Segre and Noguera Pallaresa rivers. The Camarasa reservoir on the Noguera Pallaresa (113 hm³) and the Sant Llorenç de Montgai reservoir on the Segre are important hydroelectric power stations.

It has a population of 788 (register office, 2025).

The C-147 road links the municipality with Balaguer and Tremp, and there are Renfe railway stations in Sant Llorenç de Montgai and L'Ametlla de Montsec.

The municipality includes a small exclave to the north.

== Demography ==
1900	1930	1950	1970	1986	2007
2648	2773	2087	1233	1004	933
