= Palacio del Duque de Uceda (Plaza de Colón) =

Coordinates: 40.4247°N 3.6914°W

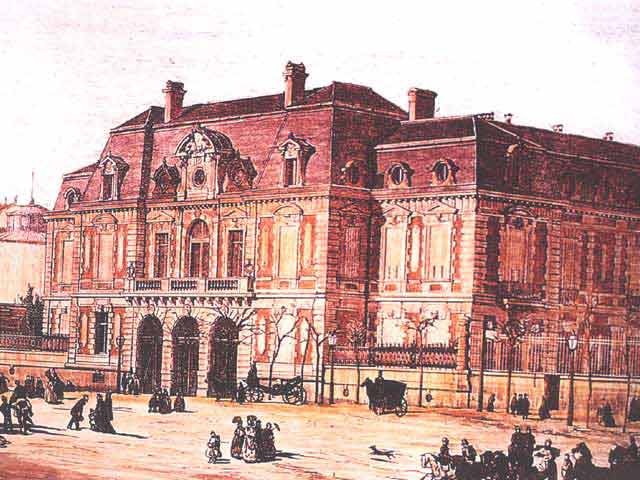
Palacio del Duque de Uceda (Plaza de Colón). Old engraving.

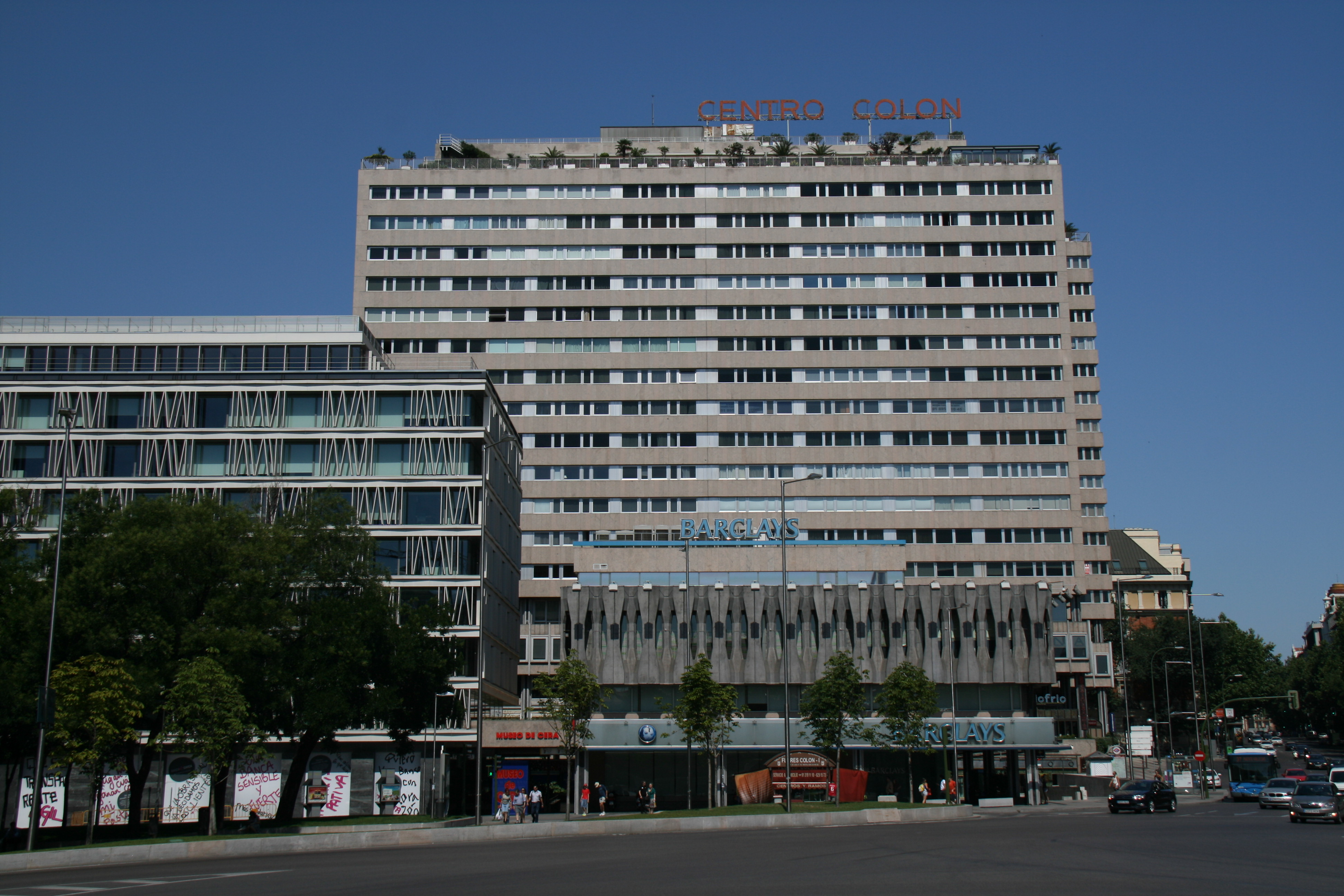
Centro Colón, modern building which replaces the palace once demolished.

The Palacio del Duque de Uceda, also known as Palacio de los Duques de Medinaceli, was a palace located in Plaza de Colón in Madrid.

This palace had two floors and superior body with slate roofing with elegant mansards, was built in 1864 by the Puerto Rican architect Mariano Andrés Avenoza, in a large site along the Plaza de Colón, between the Paseo de Recoletos and Calle de Génova.

It was the palace first property of the Duke of Uceda, to be acquired in 1876 by the Marquis of Salamanca, without ever living in it, and later, around 1890 it was purchased by Doña Ángela Pérez de Barradas y Bernuy, widow Duchess of Medinaceli, plus Duchess of Denia y Tarifa. For this reason, the palace has been known throughout its history by the names of Úceda, of Denia, of Medinaceli, and of Marqués de Salamanca, the latter through which was known the building.

The palace suffered a fire on November 25, 1917, unleashed at dawn and mainly affected the façade overlooking the Plaza de Colón. Countless works of art were lost that decorated its interior. It was rebuilt and remained in place until 1964, when its demolition was decided to work for speculative criteria in a plan to modernize the plaza. Currently in its place is an office, hotel and entertainment complex called Centro Colón.

== Sources ==
- Martínez Olmedilla, Augusto (7 May 1964). ""Requiem" por un bello palacio". ABC.
- Navascués Palacio, Pedro (1983). Un palacio romántico: Madrid, 1846-1858 (PDF). Madrid: El Viso. ISBN 84-86022-04-5.
- Navascués Palacio, Pedro (1985). "Castellana quien te ha visto y quién te ve" (PDF). Lápiz (28): 28–33. ISSN 0212-1700.
