= Duke of Ciudad Real =

Dukedom of Spain

Dukedom of Ciudad Real
- Creation date: 1613
- Created by: Philip III
- Peerage: Peerage of Spain
- First holder: Alonso de Idiázquez y Butrón, 1st Duke of Ciudad Real
- Present holder: Alexander Gonzalo de Hohenlohe-Langenburg y Schmidt-Polex, 14th Duke of Ciudad Real

Duke of Ciudad Real (Spanish: Duque de Ciudad Real) is a hereditary title in the Peerage of Spain accompanied by the dignity of Grandee, granted in 1613 by Philip III to Alonso de Idiázquez, 1st Count of Aramayona and Viceroy of Navarre.

Contrary to common belief, the title makes reference to the municipality of Cittareale in the province of Rieti, and not to the city of Ciudad Real in Spain. The first duke was granted fiefdom over Cittareale in the Kingdom of Naples, hence the translation in Spanish to "Ciudad Real".

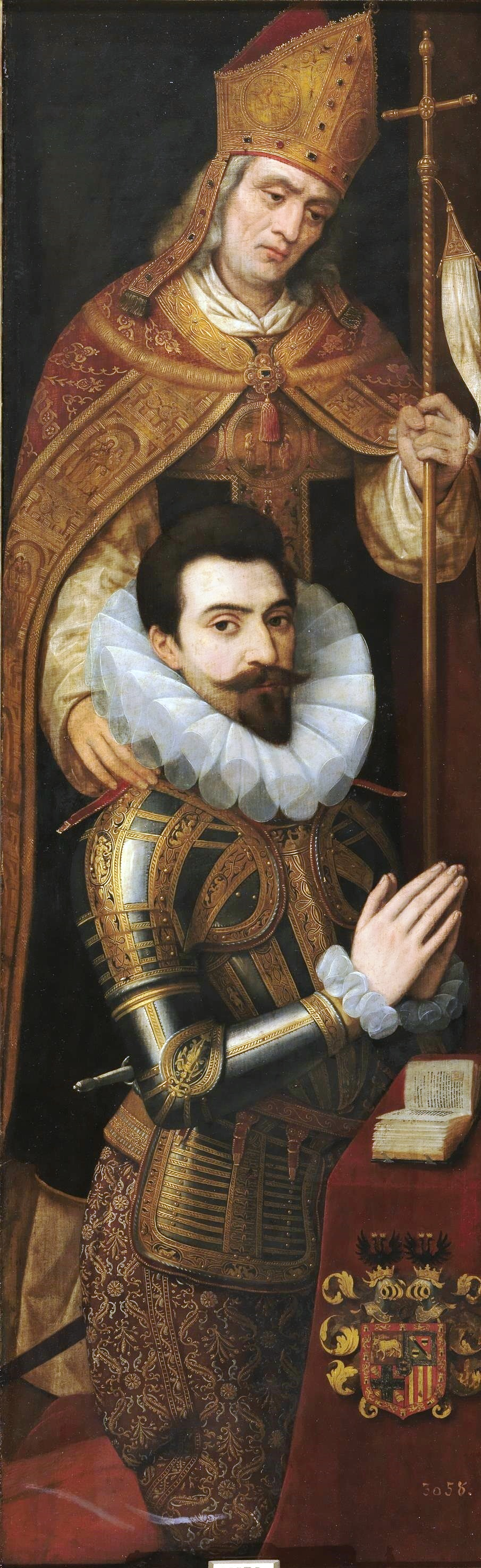
Portrait of the 1st Duke of Ciudad Real by Otto van Veen, ca. 1589

== Dukes of Ciudad Real (1613) ==
- Alonso de Idiázquez y Butrón, 1st Duke of Ciudad Real : (1613-1618)
- Juan Alonso de Idiázquez y Butrón, 2nd Duke of Ciudad Real : (1618-1653)
- Francisco Alonso de Idiázquez y Álava, 3rd Duke of Ciudad Real : (1653-1658)
- Francisco de Idiázquez y Borja, 4th Duke of Ciudad Real : (1658-1711)
- Juana María de Idiázquez y Borja, 5th Duchess of Ciudad Real : (1711-1712)
- María Antonia Pimentel e Idiázquez, 6th Duchess of Ciudad Real : (1712-1728)
- Ana María de Orozco y Villela, 7th Duchess of Ciudad Real : (1728-?)
- Joaquín Antonio Osorio y Orozco, 8th Duke of Ciudad Real : (?-1782)
- Benito Osorio y Lasso de la Vega, 9th Duke of Ciudad Real : (1782-1819)

=== Rehabilitation by King Alonso XIII ===
- Andrés Avelino de Salabert y Arteaga, 10th Duke of Ciudad Real : (1888-1925)
- Casilda de Salabert y Arteaga, 11th Duchess of Ciudad Real : (1925-1936)
- Luis Jesús Fernández de Córdoba y Salabert, 12th Duke of Ciudad Real : (1940-1956)
- Victoria Eugenia Fernández de Córdoba y Fernández de Henestrosa, 13th Duchess of Ciudad Real : (1959-2013)
- Alexander Gonzalo de Hohenlohe-Langenburg y Schmidt-Polex, 14th Duke of Ciudad Real : (2013-)

== See also ==
- List of dukes in the peerage of Spain
- List of current grandees of Spain
- Marquess of Navahermosa
