= Pedro Fernández de Córdoba y Pacheco =

Castilian nobleman

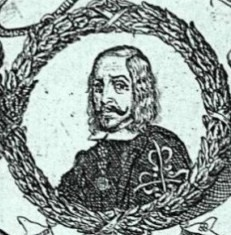

Marquess of Priego
- In office 1501–1515
- Succeeded by: Catalina Fernández de Córdoba y Enríquez

Personal details
- Born: 1470 Aguilar de la Frontera, Córdoba, Spain
- Died: 24 January 1517 (aged 46–47) Olías del Rey, Toledo, Spain
- Occupation: Nobleman

Pedro Fernández de Córdoba y Pacheco (1470 – 24 January 1517), first Marquess of Priego, was a Castilian nobleman. He became one of the most powerful men in Andalusia, but after the death of Queen Isabella I of Castile (1451–1504), he supported her daughter Joanna of Castile (1479–1555) against King Ferdinand II of Aragon (1452–1516), who was regent of Castile. After serious disturbances in Córdoba in 1508 he was forced to throw himself on the king's mercy, and was arrested and exiled. Later he was pardoned and allowed to return.

== Origins ==
The House of Córdoba, or of Fernández de Córdoba, originated with the Témez and Muñoz houses, two Castilian-Leon noble houses of the second order who moved up the social ladder during the reconquest and repopulation of the Guadalquivir valley in Andalusia. The Témez family originated in Galicia, and included Nuño Fernández, lord of Témez and Chantada during the reigns of Ferdinand II of León, Alfonso IX of León and Ferdinand III of Castile. Nuño accompanied Ferdinand III in the reconquest of Andalusia and gained distinction in the battles of Baeza, Jaén, Córdoba and Seville.

Nuño's second son Fernán Núñez (died 1283) participated in the capture of Córdoba, and was rewarded with extensive lands in Seville and Córdoba. He may be considered founder of the House of Córdoba. Fernán Núñez married Ora Muñoz, daughter of Domingo Muñoz, alcaide of Andújar, first alguacil mayor of Seville and first alcaide of the town of Dos Hermanas. Domingo Muñoz had also played an outstanding role in the reconquest of Andalusia in the battles of Andújar, Úbeda, Baeza, Córdoba and Seville. The son of Fernán Núñez and Ora Muñoz was Alfonso Fernández de Córdoba (died 1327), 2nd lord of the House of Córdoba, and the first to use the city's name as his family name.

His first son, Fernando Alfonso de Córdoba (died 1343), 1st lord of Cañete de las Torres, was the king's Alcaide de los donceles, (Note: Alcaide de los Donceles: Commander of a body of light cavalry of young men of illustrious origin in the service of the king.) a hereditary position that was soon passed to another branch of the family. His second son, Martín Alfonso de Córdoba, founded the branch of Lords of Montemayor, the origin of the Counts of Alcaudete. The first son of Fernando Alfonso de Córdoba was Gonzalo Fernández de Córdoba (died 1384) obtained Aguilar de la Frontera from Henry II of Castile. He was succeeded by Alfonso Fernández de Córdoba II (died 1424), who served in military actions on the border.

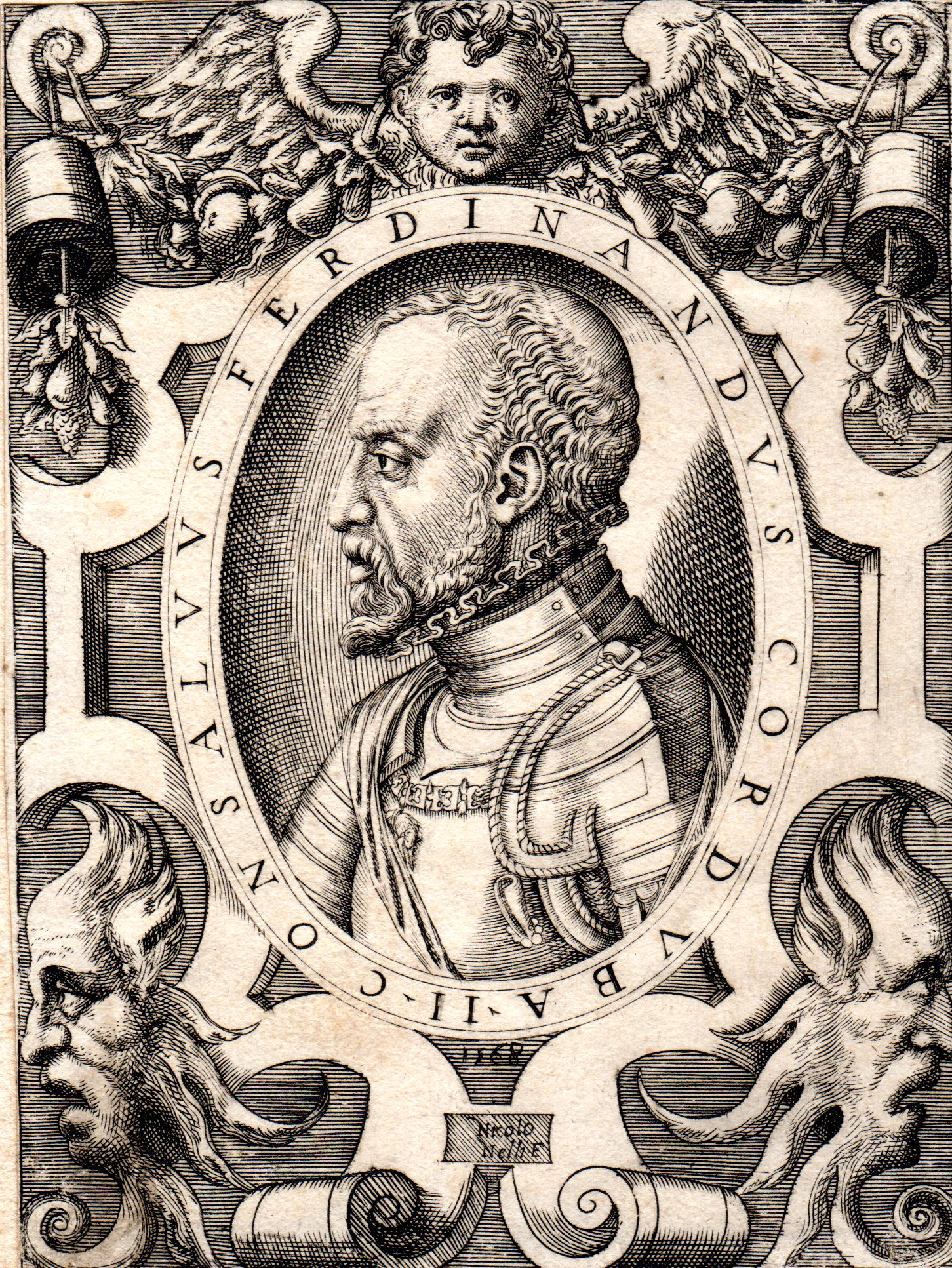
Priego's uncle, Gonzalo Fernández de Córdoba (the Gran Capitán)

Alfonso Fernández de Córdoba IV (1447–1501), head of the House of Córdoba, was better known as Alonso de Aguilar and was called "El Grande" (the Great). He played a major role in the final stages of the conquest of the Emirate of Granada from the Nasrid dynasty. He was granted the town of Carcabuey and the village of Santa Cruz. Alonso's brother, Gonzalo Fernández de Córdoba, earned the title of Duke of Terranova and the nickname of "Gran Capitán" (Great Captain) for his service in battle, and for his great ability in organizing and modernizing the army of the Catholic Monarchs, Ferdinand of Aragon and Isabella of Castile.

== Family ==
Pedro Fernandez de Cordoba y Aguilar Pacheco was born in 1470 in Aguilar de la Frontera, Córdoba, Spain. (Note: Birthdate. One source gives a date of 1470. Other sources give a birth date of 1477, or say his birth date is unknown.) His father was Alfonso Fernández de Córdoba IV and his mother was Catalina Pacheco, daughter of Juan Pacheco, 1st Marquis of Villena. He was educated by Peter Martyr d'Anghiera (1457–1526), the humanist. Pedro married Elvira Enriquez, daughter of Enrique Enriquez, lord of Orce, and great-granddaughter of Admiral Alonso Enríquez, (1354–1429). His wife's aunt was Juana Enríquez, mother of Ferdinand II. His first child was a boy who died during childbirth. The others were girls.

- Catalina (1495–1569), who inherited the title, married Lorenzo Suarez de Figueroa Garcia de Toledo (1505–1528).
- María (1497–1560) married Pedro Dávila y Zúñiga, 3rd Count of Risco and 1st Marquis of las Navas (1492–1567).
- Elvira (died 1539) married Pedro Fernández Manrique, 4th Count of Osorno (died 1569).

Five of the girls became nuns: Teresa (died 1575), Isabel, Abbess of Santa Clara in Montilla, María, nun of Santa Clara, Ángela and Juana.

== Career ==
=== Early prosperity ===
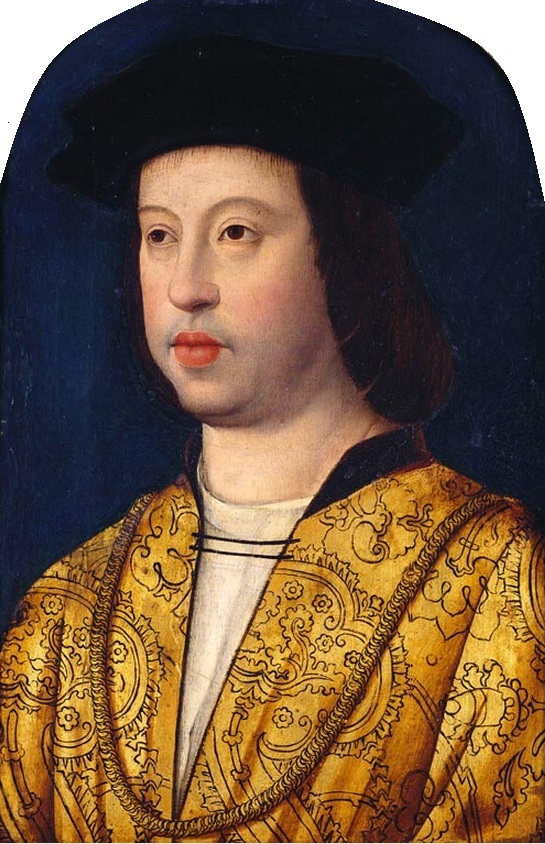
Ferdinand II of Aragon, first cousin of Pedro's wife

Pedro accompanied his father during the fighting in Granada, and saw him die in 1501 during the uprising by the Moriscos in the Alpujarras. He succeeded his father as 9th Lord of Cañete, 7th Lord of Priego, Aguilar de la Frontera, Puente de Don Gonzalo, Monturque, Castillo Anzur and Montilla, and 2nd Lord of Carcabuey and Santa Cruz. In December 1501, in posthumous tribute to his father, the Catholic Monarchs raised the rank of these domains to the Marquisate of Priego. They gave him the title of 1st Marquis of Priego and a grant of 300,000 maravedis. He was Alcalde mayor (Chief Justice) and Alguacil mayor (Chief of Police) of Córdoba, Alcalde mayor of Antequera, Alcaide (Governor) of the Alcázar de los Reyes Cristianos, of Antequera and of Alcalá la Real.

One of Priego's first acts was to sign a defensive alliance with Diego Deza, Archbishop of Seville, the Duke of Medina Sidonia, the Count of Cabra and the Count of Ureña. The threats were not named, but it is clear that the pact was to defend their privileges against two new instruments created by the Catholic Monarchs, the corregimientos and the Inquisition.

In 1500 Montalbán was the property of Doña Beatriz de Montemayor and her husband Fernán Yáñez de Badajoz (Alcaide Mayor of Écija). The estate was depopulated, and they decided to convert the land to pasture. The new Marquis of Priego felt that Montalbán was within his jurisdiction and was strategically important to his Señorío of Aguilar in the disputed region bordering La Rambla. Priego and his cousins of Montemayor were on bad terms at the time, so he arranged for another relative, the Alcaide de los Donceles, to buy the castle and town of Montalbán. The sale was made at the huge price of three million maravedis, and the rights to Montalbán were transferred to Priego in 1503. He commissioned his servant Luis Alvárez to distribute the farmland and vineyards to newcomers, and within forty years the population was over 500 families.

=== Resistance to the king ===
The death of Queen Isabella in 1504 caused growing support in Castile for the faction of Philip the Handsome (1478–1506), her son-in-law, which wanted to stop Ferdinand II of Aragon from proclaiming himself king (Note: Technically Ferdinand II had no claim to Castile, since he was simply the consort of the former queen. In practice, he was much the most powerful person in Spain at the time, was the natural choice to be guardian of his daughter Joanna, and had proclaimed himself regent of Castile.) at the expense of his daughter Joanna of Castile and her husband Philip. Priego joined the faction opposed to Ferdinand and became its leader in Córdoba. He was opposed by the Alcaide de los Donceles, Diego Fernández de Córdoba y Mendoza, 3rd Count of Cabra. Priego allied with Juan Alfonso Pérez de Guzmán, 3rd Duke of Medina Sidonia, Juan Téllez-Girón, 2nd Count of Ureña and the Marquis of Cádiz (Note: Marquis of Cádiz: Rodrigo Ponce de León, Marquis of Cádiz, died in 1492. His daughter Francisca became III Marquesa de Cádiz. She married her first cousin, Luis Ponce de León y de Figueroa, Lord of Villagarcía. This may be who the source is referring to.) to maintain peace throughout Andalusia and to keep the region on the side of Queen Juana.

The situation was unstable, and the occupation of offices by the rival supporters of Priego and the Count of Cabra almost caused a serious confrontation in the city in 1506. With the support of Philip the Handsome, Priego's faction gained the ascendancy. In 1507 the people rose up against the brutal inquisitor Diego Rodríguez de Lucero, supposedly encouraged by Priego. In 1507 Ferdinand appointed corregidores to investigate and resolve the dispute between the people of Cordoba and the inquisition. Priego was deposed from his office as Alguacil mayor by one of the corregidores, but had been reinstated by June 1508. The king sent Fernando López de Córdoba to investigate, and Priego imprisoned him at Montilla on the basis that he had not been appointed by Queen Juana. Several senior members of the Castilian aristocracy had to defend Priego to the king.

=== Trial and aftermath ===
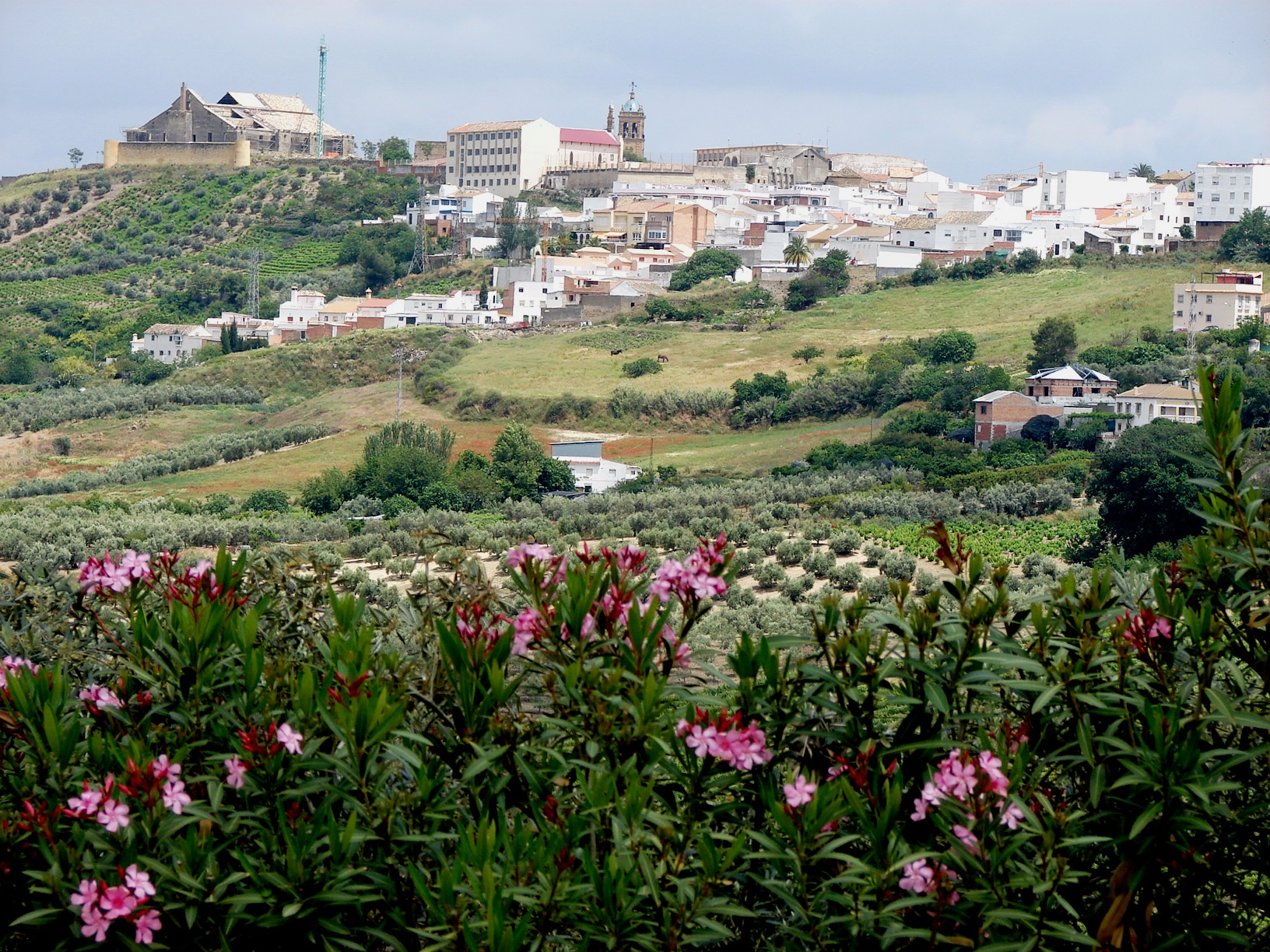
Montilla in 2008. The large building on the hill to the left is the Alhorí de Montilla, built on the ruins of the castle.

When Priego's uncle, Gonzalo Fernández de Córdoba (the Gran Capitán), explained how angry the king was, Priego went to plead his case before the king. He reached Toledo in September 1508. Fernando would not talk to him until he had surrendered his strongholds. The king removed him from his offices, confiscated his property, ordered the destruction of his castle at Montilla (Note: The medieval castle of Montilla was partially demolished in 1508 by order of King Ferdinand II of Aragon. In 1722 Juan Antonio Camacho de Saavedra was given a commission to build a granary on the site, the Alhorí de Montilla. He reused what was left of the old fortress to create a large and beautiful granary.) and fined him 20 million maravedis. He was sent back to Córdoba where he was tried for treason. Priego was found guilty of treason and sentenced to death, but the sentence was commuted to exile to the Kingdom of Valencia. (Note: Pleyto del manto is a poem with 593 verses by an anonymous poet followed by 95 verses by García de Astorga, written about the time of Priego's exile. It takes the form of speeches in a court of law by lawyers for the accuser (Carajo) and plaintiff (Coño). Ostensibly it is about the mock trial following an incident were the male accuser and female plaintiff were found naked making love, and a stranger threw a cloak over them, saying ambiguously "this mantle is for what is inside." After much sexual wordplay the judge concludes that the cloak belongs to the woman. The poem may be seen as an allegory for the trial of Priego, in which his rights and those of Ferdinand were by no means clear.)

Priego was forgiven in 1510 and his offices and properties were restored. After being pardoned he lived in retirement until his death. Pedro Fernandez de Cordoba y Aguilar Pacheco died on 24 January 1517 in Olías del Rey, Toledo. His remains are in the Monastery of San Lorenzo de la Orden de San Francisco, in Montilla, Córdoba.

== Sources ==
- Baena Sánchez, Alicia (2018), Estudio histórico-técnico y reconstrucción virtual del Alhorí de los Duques de Medinaceli de Montilla a través de la obra del arquitecto Juan Antonio Camacho de Saavedra, Universidad de Córdoba, UCOPress
- Delgado Jordan, Guillermo Carlos, "Pedro Fernandez de Cordoba y Aguilar Pacheco", geneanet (in Spanish)
- Dominguez, Frank A. (2017), "Pleyto del manto (ca 1508/1509)", eHumanista: Journal of Iberian Studies, 36: 241–303, ISSN 1540-5877
- Molina Recio, Raúl (2018), Pedro Fernández de Córdoba (in Spanish), Real Academia de la Historia
- Pedro Fernández de Córdoba (in Spanish), FCDM: Fundación Casa Ducal de Medinaceli
- Ruz Pérez, Andrés (4 September 2015), Pedro Fernández de Córdoba y Pacheco, I Marqués de Priego, ¿la persona más importante en la historia de Montalbán? (in Spanish)
- Sánchez González, Antonio, La Casa de los Marqueses de Priego, señores de Aguilar (in Spanish), Universidad de Almería, Almería, ISSN 2605-0315
- Sánchez González, Antonio (21 November 2017), EL ARTE DE LA REPRESENTACIÓN DEL ESPACIO: MAPAS Y PLANOS DE LA COLECCIÓN MEDINACELI, Servicio de Publicaciones de la Universidad de Huelva, ISBN 978-84-17066-31-4
