= Juan Antonio Camacho de Saavedra =

- Born: 1669
- Died: 4 October 1740 (aged 70–71)
- Occupation: Architect
- Known for: Alhorí de Montilla etc.

Juan Antonio Camacho de Saavedra (1669 – 4 October 1740) was a master architect of Córdoba, Spain who was active in the 18th century. He was responsible for many civil, religious and industrial buildings in the baroque style.

== Life ==
Juan Antonio Camacho de Saavedra was born in 1669, the fourth of five children of the master builder Jeronimo Camacho of Córdoba and of Maria Ana de Saavedra of Écija. Before the age of twenty he married his first cousin Antonia Ortiz, a native of La Rambla. His first wife gave him five children. His second wife was Antonia Vázquez, sister of the writer and sculptor Fr. Juan Vázquez.

Camacho became a master builder, and as an architect and engineer repaired various industrial buildings. Both the nobility and the church noticed his ability, and he earned positions such as Master of Works of Córdoba, Master of Works of the Cathedral and Diocese of Córdoba and Master of Works of Priego. The main body of Camacho's work was done for Nicolás Fernández de Córdoba y de la Cerda, 8th Marquis of Priego and Duke of Medinaceli. In 1727, when he was 47 years old, Camacho had leased some houses of importance to the Angulo family in the square of San Andrés, Cordoba for one thousand fleeces annually. He was senior master of works of the city and the bishopric, charged with repairing the diocese's mills.

Towards the end of his life he was ruined, and he died in anonymity. On the day before he died he signed a codicil to his will in which he declared that he was impoverished and the city of Cordoba owed him twenty thousand reais for his work on the Visos road and the Bridge of Alcolea. He died the next day, 4 October 1740.

== Works ==
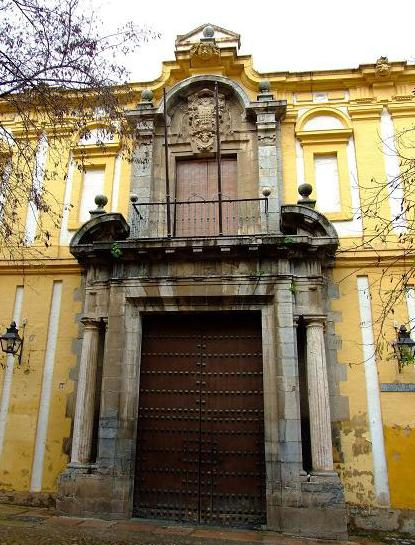
Hospital del Cardenal Salazar

Camacho undertook an overhaul of the Medinaceli ducal palace in Montilla. The blueprints from 1709 have been preserved, although the work is now hard to distinguish due to later changes. He was responsible for the stairs of the Córdoba town hall. Minor works include the repair of the Capilla del Nacimiento in the Montilla parish church, structural reinforcement of the Tercia of Monturque and repair of the Tercia's oil mill in 1711.

The Franciscan Convent of San Lorenzo, which was outside the city of Montilla, was moved to the city center in the 17th century. At the end of that century the Friars Recollects of the convent were housed in the central building of the College of the Incarnation, which had belonged to the Society of Jesus. Nicolás Fernández de Córdoba, 10th Duke de Medinaceli, paid for construction of a luxurious infirmary designed by Camacho in the place the Franciscans had left the majestic stone building is surrounded by secondary stone structures such as the convent church, three hermitages, a gateway, courtyards and a small garden. The infirmary has 7 individual rooms on each of its two floors. On the ground floor there was a large room for the nurses, a kitchen, pantry and storage rooms.

The medieval castle of Montilla was built in the thirteenth century and partially demolished in 1508 by order of King Ferdinand II of Aragon to punish the 1st Marquis of Priego, Pedro Fernández de Córdoba y Pacheco for having led a riot in Córdoba against the inquisitor Diego Rodríguez de Lucero. Much of the material was used for other buildings in the city. In 1722 Camacho was given a commission to build a granary on the site, the Alhorí de Montilla. He reused what was left of the old fortress to create a large and beautiful granary. His construction of the Alhorí de Montilla (1723) respected the architectural elements of the remains of the medieval castle.

The Hospital del Cardenal Salazar (1724) has great architectural beauty, with a facade of columns with Doric capitals flanking the arched entrance. The rooms surrounded patios that brought them light and air. In 1728 Camacho won the commission as master builder for the Baeza Gate Fountain. Camacho designed the Miragenil bridge arch over the Genil river in Puente Genil (1728). He designed the Ronda bridge over the Tagus waterfall with a round arch 35 metres (115 ft) in diameter and a platform 7 metres (23 ft) wide in collaboration with José García. For the Tagus bridge in Ronda he had to borrow the large amount of 20,000 ducats. The foundations were poorly built to save on cost, and the bridge collapsed in 1741. It was rebuilt between 1759 and 1793.

Camacho made a major repair of the Martos mill (1731). In 1731 he was also working on the Franciscan convent of San Pedro el Real, with a facade very similar in style to that of the Hospital of Cardinal Salazar, which now houses the faculty of Philosophy and Letters. In 1733 he was working on the palace house of the nobleman Luis Fernández de Córdoba.

== Sources ==
- Baena Sánchez, Alicia (2018), Estudio histórico-técnico y reconstrucción virtual del Alhorí de los Duques de Medinaceli de Montilla a través de la obra del arquitecto Juan Antonio Camacho de Saavedra, Universidad de Córdoba, UCOPress
- Baena Sánchez, Alicia (2019-07-22), "Aproximación a la obra de Juan Antonio Camacho de Saavedra" (PDF), EGA. Revista de Expresión Gráfica Arquitectónica, doi:10.4995/ega.2019.8769
- Garramiola Prieto, Enrique (2013), "El Castillo de Montilla y las cuitas del arquitecto Cordobés Juan Antonio Camacho (1678-1740)" (PDF), Crónica de Córdoba y sus Pueblos (in Spanish), vol. XIX, Córdoba: Ilustre Asociación Provincial Cordobesa de Cronistas Oficiales, ISBN 978-84-8154-398-8
- Sánchez González, Antonio (21 November 2017), EL ARTE DE LA REPRESENTACIÓN DEL ESPACIO: MAPAS Y PLANOS DE LA COLECCIÓN MEDINACELI, Servicio de Publicaciones de la Universidad de Huelva, ISBN 978-84-17066-31-4
