= Siege of Rheinfelden (1633) =

1633 battle of the Thirty Years' War

- Part of the Thirty Years' War
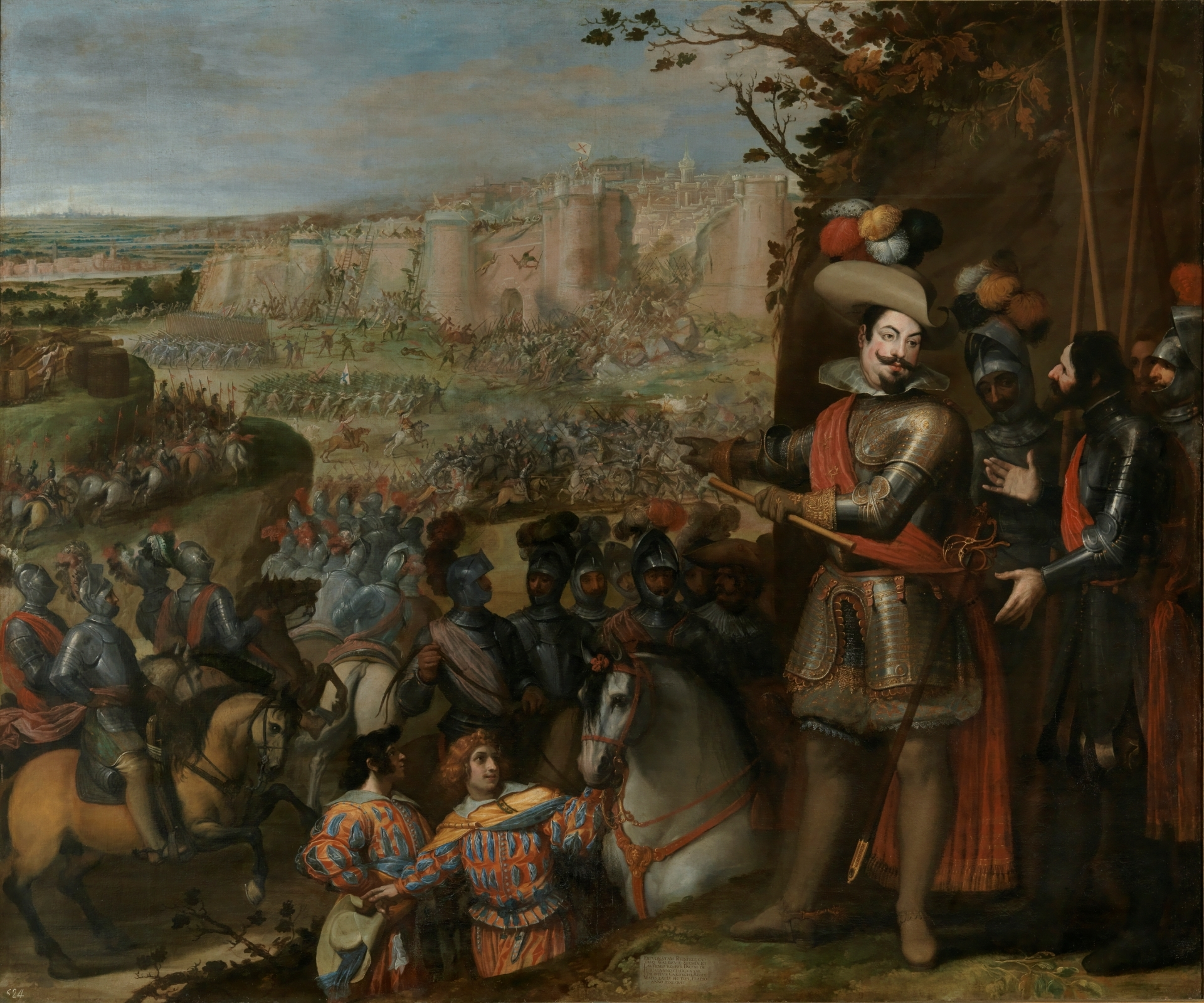
- The Capture of Rheinfelden by Vincenzo Carducci.
Date	17 October 1633
Location	Rheinfelden, Further Austria (present-day Switzerland) 47°33′N 7°48′E
Result	Spanish victory
Territorial changes	Rheinfelden is captured by the Spaniards

Belligerents
(Spain) Spanish Empire	(yes) Swedish Empire

Commanders and leaders
(Spain) Duke of Feria	Unknown

Strength
20,000 men	350 men

Casualties and losses
Minimal	Everyone killed
- Location within Switzerland Rheinfelden (Germany)

The siege of Rheinfelden of 1633 or the Spanish recapture of Rheinfelden (Spanish: La Expugnación de Rheinfelden) took place in late October 1633, during the Thirty Years' War.

The Spanish Army of Alsace (20,000 troops) led by the Duke of Feria, Governor of the Duchy of Milan, recaptured the Habsburgian city of Rheinfelden after relieving Konstanz, Breisach and Bregenz. His plan, designed by the favourite and chief minister of Philip IV of Spain, Don Gaspar de Guzmán, Count-Duke of Olivares, was to release the Spanish road along the Rhine of the harassment by Swedish and Protestant-German troops (Heilbronn League), defend the Franche-Comté, safeguard the Tyrol, support the troops of the Holy Roman Empire, and open a strategic corridor for the Spanish troops from the Spanish Lombardy to the Spanish Netherlands.

== See also ==
- Spanish Road
- Heilbronn League
- Catholic League
- Duchy of Milan
- Franche-Comté
- List of governors of the Duchy of Milan
