= Scalpers =

Spanish menswear store chain

Scalpers Fashion, S.L.
- Company type: Sociedad limitada
- Industry: Retail
- Founded: 2007
- Founder: Rafael de Medina, 20th Duke of Feria
- Headquarters: Seville, Spain
- Number of locations: 180 stores
- Area served: Worldwide
- Key people: Borja Vázquez Piñero (Chairman); Alfonso Vivancos Arigita (CEO)
- Products: Clothing
- Revenue: ▲€42 million (2018)
- Number of employees: +350 employees
- Website: scalperscompany.com

Scalpers is a chain of men's fashion stores founded in Seville, Spain, in 2007. In 2018, Scalpers reported €42 million in sales, with 132 stores and other points of sale and 314 employees. In the same year it reported that 8.5% of its sales was via e-commerce.

The chain was founded by the 20th Duke of Feria and his friends, and became known for "elegant" suits and ties as well as making slippers fashionable among what Spanish publishers referred to as the "jet set".

Scalpers operates owned shops as well as what it calls "corners" (mini-shops within department stores El Corte Inglés, Falabella and El Palacio de Hierro) in Spain, Andorra, Chile, Ecuador, the UAE, France, Mexico, and Portugal.

At first the brand only manufactured and sold men's clothing, accessories and shoes, but in 2013 it launched its children's collection, in 2018 its women's collection and in 2019 a capsule collection for girls.

In 2017, Scalpers began expanding internationally and today has a presence in Europe, Latin America and the Middle East. In all this expansion strategy, the company has diversified, not only within the men's fashion itself, but with a line for women and children, and now has "all the meat on the spit" with the online store: "To do this, we have developed new platforms, we have incorporated new equipment and we are working with the major world marketplaces in distribution", says Vázquez,

Currently, the range of products includes suits, sportswear, sustainable collections and collaborations with other brands. In 2009 it launched its online store and is currently operating in seven different markets.

== Stores ==
Scalpers currently has over 180 points of sale, including its own stores, franchises, corners in different showrooms and department stores. It is present in Spain, Portugal, and in countries outside the European Union such as Mexico, Chile, Qatar, Peru or the United Arab Emirates.

== Performance ==
Scalpers closed the 2017 fiscal year with sales of €42 million and in 2018 is expected to exceed €60 million.

The company increased its sales by 31% in 2019, reaching €83 million. The company reported that this increase was due to year on year sales increases and the opening of more than 30 new points of sale. Online sales had increased by 58% over the previous year and by 2019 represented more than 15% of sales.

Scalpers operates in the Spanish domestic market with nearly 190 points of sale, including both single-brand stores (with a total of 62) and corners in El Corte Inglés. The company states that it continues to look for opportunities in the country and continues to grow its network of establishments, after opening in 2019 in cities such as A Coruña and Logroño.
