= Diego Rodríguez de Lucero =

Inquisitor of the Spanish Inquisition

Inquisitor of Córdoba
- In office 1499–1507

Personal details
- Born: Moguer, Castile
- Died: Seville, Castile
- Occupation: Priest

Diego Rodríguez de Lucero was a priest and inquisitor of the Kingdom of Castile based in Córdoba between 1499 and 1507. His harsh and unjust persecutions created a reign of terror, and eventually he was removed from office.

== Origins ==
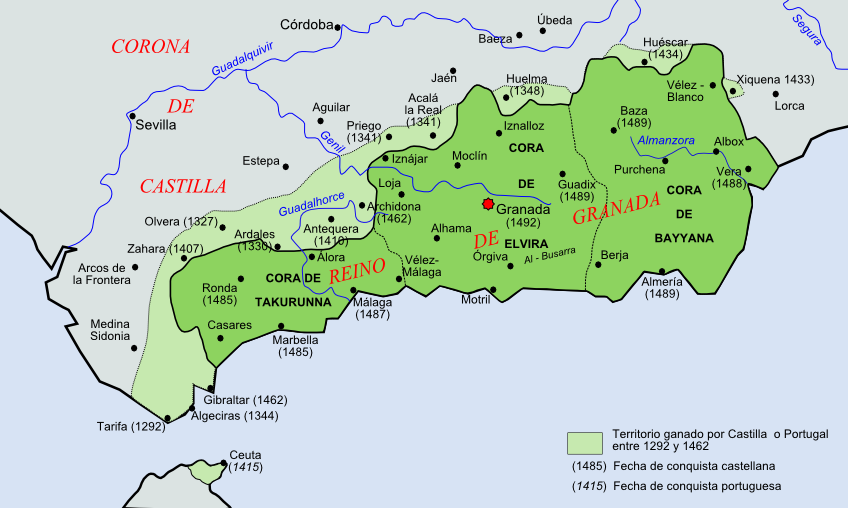
Emirate of Granada in 1462. The conquest was completed during the Granada War (1482–91).

The birth date of Diego Rodríguez de Lucero is unknown, but he seems to have been born in Moguer. This was a region where many of the people were converts from Judaism or Islam, which perhaps helps explain his fanaticism. His parents were Juan Lucero and Marina Rodriguez. He received a bachelor's degree in Law and a degree in Theology. He became a prelate and a canon of Seville. There is an early reference to Rodríguez de Lucero working as an inquisitor in Jerez de la Frontera, followed by a reference to him in mid-1492 in Córdoba asking for a position as a schoolmaster in Almería. He may not have got that job, but in later documents he is given the title of schoolmaster. In 1495 he was a judge of confiscated assets (Note: Confiscated assets: the property of people found guilty of heresy, including converted Jews found to be practicing their old faith in secret.) in Jerez de la Frontera.

== Inquisitor ==
The Spanish Inquisition was created in 1478 to persecute Jewish converts to Christianity and their descendants, accused of secretly retaining their ancestral faith. The Jews were expelled from Aragon and Castile in 1492, and the last secret synagogues were found and destroyed around 1500. In 1499 there were rumors among the conversos and crypto-Jewish people of Córdoba that the end of the world would come in 1500. When the Inquisition heard of this, it opened an investigation.

On 7 September 1499 the Grand Inquisitor, Diego Deza, appointed Diego Rodríguez de Lucero inquisitor of Córdoba. As described in the Catalog of the Bishop of Cordoba, "After the death of the first inquisitors, Diego Rodríguez Lucero, schoolmaster, came from Almería in the year 1500". As inquisitor of the Córdoba tribunal he gave his address as Encarnación Street, very close to the Mosque–Cathedral. He launched a fierce persecution of Jews who had converted to Christianity, and created a reign of terror in Andalusia. His hardness and excesses in the trials became proverbial. The chronicler Peter Martyr d'Anghiera called him "the Dark One". Others at the time said he was an "exceptional monster, inspired by Lucifer." Gómez Bravo wrote of him:

he had a pungent and hard genius; and to accredit himself as a jealous minister in the faith, and to accumulate merit for promotion to greater dignities, he began to treat inmates of prison with exquisite rigor so that they could denounce others as accomplices, which resulted in so many numbers of indicted persons, both converts and from other pure families, the city was scandalized and came to tumult.

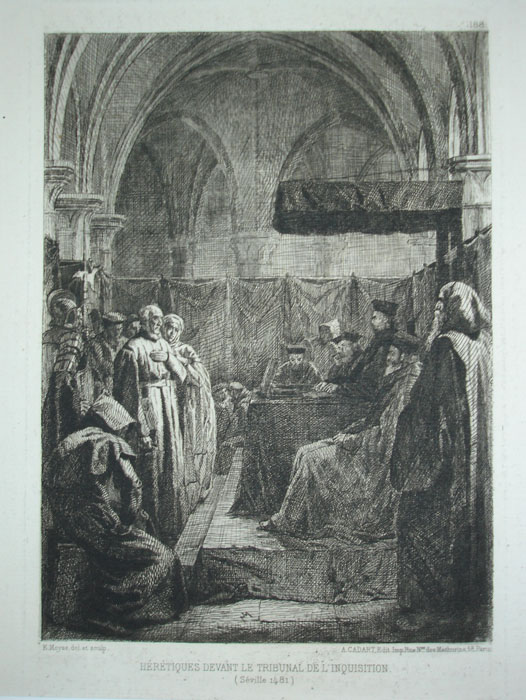
Heretics before the 1481 tribunal in Seville (drawn in 1870)

At this time the tribunal had jurisdiction throughout the new Archdiocese of Granada. Rodríguez de Lucero undertook many investigations in the city of Granada. Lucero waited for Queen Isabel to die on 26 November 1504 before involving the archbishop of Granada, Hernando de Talavera and his family in a case of alleged heresy. Several hundred innocent people, many of them supporters of Queen Isabel, were executed at the stake. The Inquisitor General, supported by the king, suppressed all protest. (Note: The attitude of Rodríguez de Lucero was very different from later officials of the Holy Office who imposed only minor penalties for occasional transgressions by people of otherwise good character.)

Rodríguez de Lucero celebrated an auto-da-fé in Córdoba in December 1504 that caused widespread fear. His testimony of the massacre said, "when he burned a hundred and seven men they were shouting to God and the Virgin to forgive them and saying that they never committed the sin of heresy, and called on the scribes to testify that they died as Christian Catholics and in the faith of Jesus Christ."

== Growing opposition ==
Due to Rodríguez de Lucero's many excesses, the Count of Cabra wrote to Diego Deza, Archbishop of Seville and Grand Inquisitor, and to the municipal and ecclesiastical councils of Seville, asking that Rodríguez de Lucero be removed from office. Deza rejected the allegations and would not act. Rodríguez de Lucero stepped up his activities and ordered demolition of numerous houses in Córdoba that he claimed were synagogues. There were many victims of new autos-da-fé. After burning the defendants Rodríguez de Lucero burned all the instruments of torture, leaving no trace of what had been done.

Some nobles and knights went to King Ferdinand II of Aragon, at that time regent of Castile, but did not succeed. The King may have been influenced by the fact that all the confiscated assets became the property of the crown. (Note: This was an unsettled time. Isabella I of Castile died in 1504 leaving Castile to her daughter Juana, wife of Philip of Austria. Juana was insane so Ferdinand acted as regent. In 1506 Ferdinand renounced the government to Philip, but soon after Philip died and Ferdinand again became regent of Castile. In 1516 Juana and Philip's son Charles finally became king of both Aragon and Castile, and in 1519 became Holy Roman Emperor.) The nobles even appealed to Pope Julius II. In November 1506 some nobles, including Diego Fernández de Córdoba y Mendoza, Count of Cabra and Pedro Fernández de Córdoba y Pacheco, Marquis of Priego, instigated a riot in which the inquisition's prison was assaulted and the prisoners released. Rodríguez de Lucero fled through a tunnel and mounted a mule to save his life. (Note: The medieval castle of Montilla, built in the thirteenth century, was partially demolished in 1508 by order of King Ferdinand to punish the 1st Marquis of Priego, Pedro Fernández de Córdoba y Pacheco for having led the 1506 riot. In 1722 Juan Antonio Camacho de Saavedra was given a commission to build a granary on the site, the Alhorí de Montilla.)

== Downfall ==
Francisco Jiménez de Cisneros became Grand Inquisitor in 1507. Cisneros imprisoned Rodríguez de Lucero in 1508 and tried him. It was shown that his accusations had been false, and his victims were released from prison. Rodríguez de Lucero was removed from office, and some of the houses he had destroyed were rebuilt. However, he was allowed to return to his post as canon in Seville, where he lived on for many years.

== Sources ==
- Baena Sánchez, Alicia (2018), Estudio histórico-técnico y reconstrucción virtual del Alhorí de los Duques de Medinaceli de Montilla a través de la obra del arquitecto Juan Antonio Camacho de Saavedra, Universidad de Córdoba, UCOPress
- "Diego Rodríguez de Lucero", Biografías y Vidas (in Spanish)
- La Piconera, El Inquisidor Lucero y como lo echaron los cordobeses de la ciudad (in Spanish)
- Pérez, Joseph (26 February 2014), Cisneros, el cardenal de España (Colección Españoles Eminentes) (in Spanish), Penguin Random House Grupo Editorial España, ISBN 978-84-306-0958-1
- Recio Mateo, Luis, "El inquisidor Rodríguez de Lucero", cordobainterculturalidad.com (in Spanish)
- Rubén Maslatón, Sergio (2 February 2017), Los Judíos en España y Portugal: Historia social, política y religiosa de los Judíos de España y Portugal (in Spanish), Moy Amiga
- Sánchez González, Antonio (21 November 2017), EL ARTE DE LA REPRESENTACIÓN DEL ESPACIO: MAPAS Y PLANOS DE LA COLECCIÓN MEDINACELI, Servicio de Publicaciones de la Universidad de Huelva, ISBN 978-84-17066-31-4
- Thomas, Werner (27 March 2019), "The Metamorphosis of the Spanish Inquisition, 1520-1648", A Companion to Heresy Inquisitions, BRILL, ISBN 978-90-04-39387-5
