= Naty Abascal =

Spanish socialite and fashion model (born 1943)

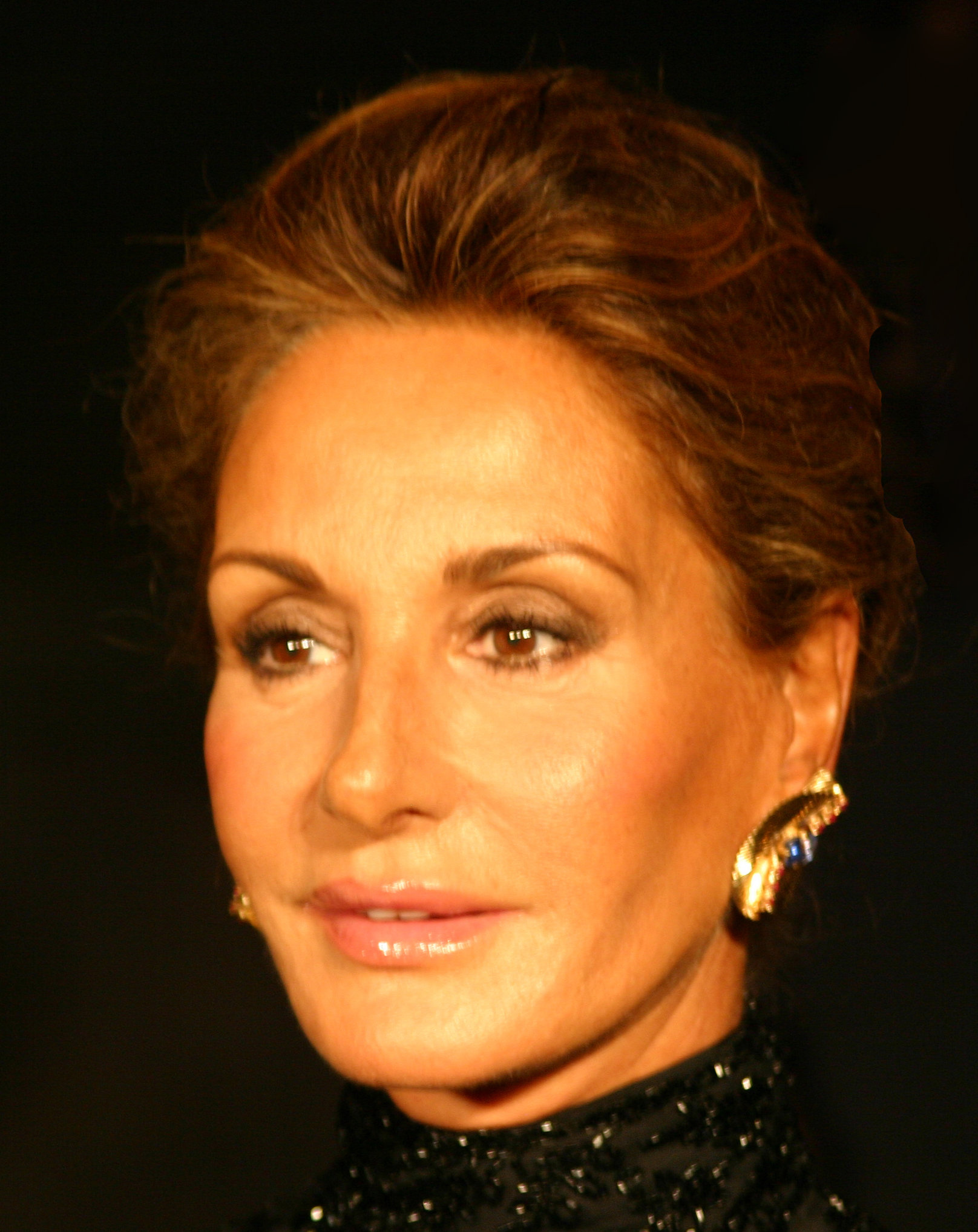
- Abascal, September 2007
- Born: 2 April 1943 (age 82); Seville, Spain

Natividad Abascal y Romero-Toro (born 2 April 1943, in Seville, Spain), more commonly known as Naty Abascal ([ˈnatjaβaˈskal]) formerly, the Duchess of Feria, is a Spanish socialite and former fashion model. She has been a member of the International Best Dressed List since 1984.

== Biography ==
Naty Abascal is the daughter of Domingo Abascal y Fernández, a wealthy lawyer and owner of a vast olive grove estate in Andalusia, and his wife María Natividad Romero-Toro y Noriega, and the granddaughter of Joaquín Romero y de Ochoa, 3rd Marquis of Romero-Toro (a papal title). She was born with a twin sister into a family of 12 siblings.

Her modeling career started when Spanish fashion designer Elio Berhanyer asked both her and her twin sister Ana María Abascal to model some of his designs at the International Exhibition in New York in 1964. The couple caught Richard Avedon's eye and he decided to photograph them in Ibiza later in 1964 for his 'The Iberians (The Blaze in Spain)' editorial in Harper's Bazaar. By 1965 Abascal was on the cover of this publication in another photograph signed by Avedon. After this, her modeling career took off and she fixed her residence in New York. Among others, she worked for Oscar de la Renta from his very early days -in fact they met while he was still working for Elizabeth Arden- and became great friends, a friendship that lasted until his death.

Designer Valentino met Abascal in 1968 at a party when she was 25 years old. By then, she had already been working as a model in New York for at least 3 years and had a full-time contract with Ford model agency; years later she would also be employed by Wilhelmina model agency. Valentino brought her to the island of Capri for modeling shoots and, ever since, they've remained close friends.

In 1971 Abascal married Murray Livingstone Smith, a vice-president of an advertising agency, although this has been disputed. They met at Cartier in NYC, and a few months later Smith sent a red Ferrari to her house with a note saying "Marry me". They did, but split up in 1975.

In 1971 she also had a short role within Woody Allen's 1971 film Bananas as the guerrilla girl Yolanda. This same year she posed nude for Playboy magazine and was also the cover of Andy Warhol's magazine Interview.

In 1974 she made a 'commercial/happening' for Alka-Seltzer with Salvador Dalí which was seen as "too aggressive" by certain viewers. Dalí was shown pretending to stab Naty with some paint brushes, at the same time as he painted her body. The commercial was not particularly successful and was taken back from public view quite quickly.

Towards the end of 1975 she returned to her home in Seville (Spain). She reunited with an ex-boyfriend from her teenage years, Rafael Medina y Fernandez de Cordoba, Duke of Feria and Marquis of Villalba and they married in July 1977 and had two sons: Rafael, born on 25 September 1978, who is the present Duke of Feria, and Luis, born on 30 August 1980.

At the beginning of the 1980s, and well after having left the fashion world, she jumped again on the catwalks for her friend Carolina Herrera's first collection. It would be her last catwalk show. In 1982, several years after having left the fashion world, Norman Parkinson decided to portray her in the Caribbean for Town and Country magazine. In 1984 she presented Oscar de la Renta's collection to the Spanish media and in 1987 Lord Snowdon also photographed her in Seville. Naty and Rafael Medina split up in 1989 and divorced on unfriendly terms.

Abascal is known as one of Valentino Garavani's Spanish muses and she's also closely connected to Oscar de la Renta and Carolina Herrera, among other designers. She still works regularly as a stylist for Hola! magazine as well as many other punctual projects.

== Notable published works ==
- Cuestión de estilo. Martínez Roca. Barcelona. 2000. ISBN 9788427025523
- Manual de estilo de Naty Abascal con Vicente Gallart. Grijalbo. Madrid. 2013. ISBN 9788425351198
