= Army of Alsace =

Army of Alsace may refer to:

- Army of Alsace (1633), a Spanish field army during the Thirty Years' War
- Army of Alsace (1914), a French field army during the First World War
