= Lorenzo Suárez de Figueroa, 2nd Duke of Feria =

Spanish diplomat and nobleman (Mechelen, 28 September 1559 - Naples, 27 January 1607)

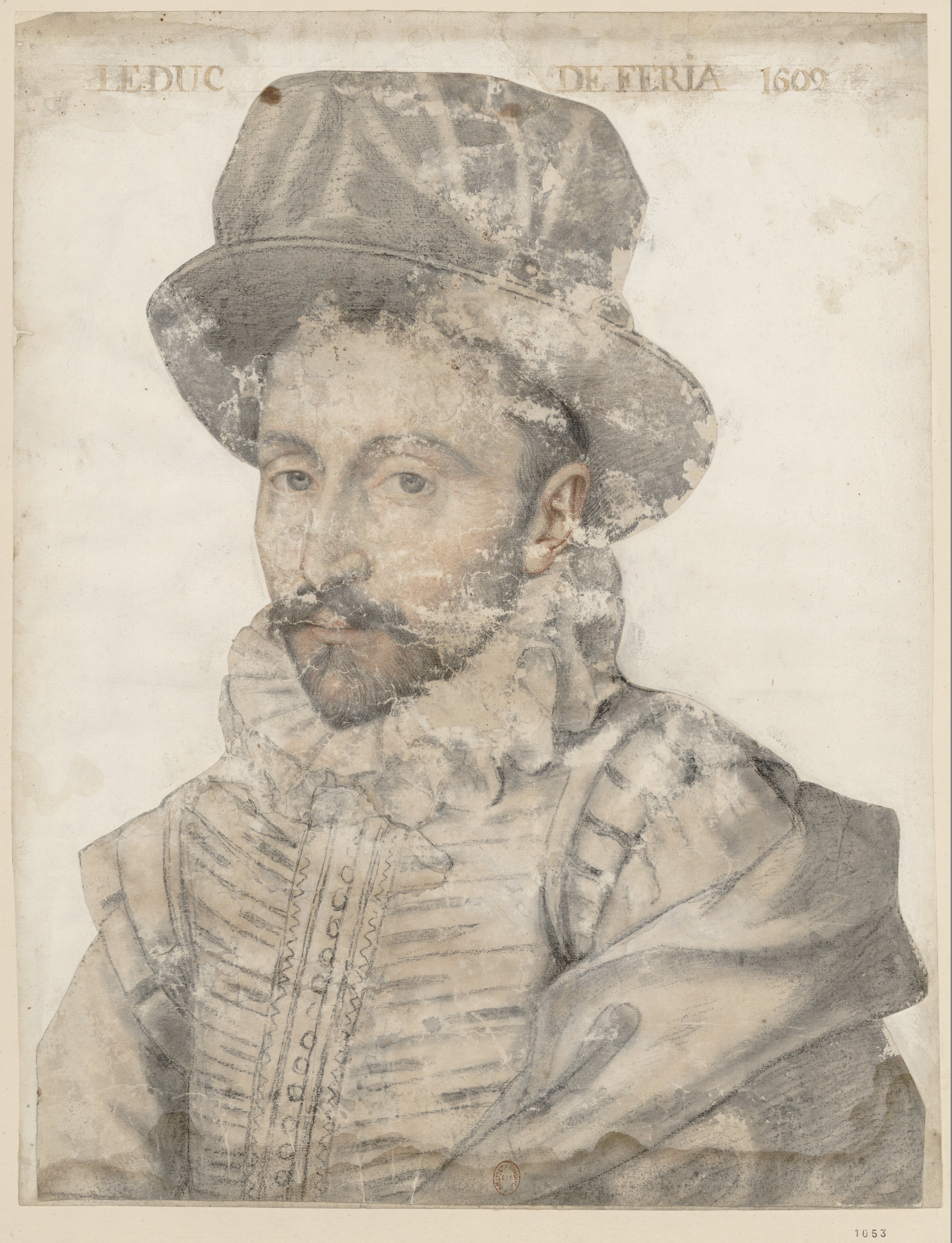
The Duke of Feria in 1602 by Daniel Dumonstier

Lorenzo Suárez de Figueroa y Dormer, 2nd Duke of Feria (Mechelen, 28 September 1559 - Naples, 27 January 1607) was a Spanish peer.

He was the son of Gómez Suárez de Figueroa y Córdoba, 1st Duke of Feria and Jane Dormer, an English lady-in-waiting to Mary I. He succeeded his father at the age of 12.

He served as Spanish ambassador in Rome (1591–1592), France (1593–1595), Viceroy of Catalonia (1596–1602) and Viceroy of Sicily (1603–1607), where he strengethened the defences of the island against failed ottoman attacked, and led bombing and raiding campaigns against Alger, Tunis, Misrata and Tripoli.

He married twice: in 1577, to Isabel de Cárdenas, daughter of the Marquess of Elche, and in 1586, to Isabel de Mendoza, daughter of Íñigo López de Mendoza y Mendoza, 5th Duke of the Infantado. His second wife gave him his only surviving son and successor to the Dukedom of Feria, Gómez Suárez de Figueroa.

== Life ==
He was born in Mechelen, and died in Naples.

== Sources ==
- Fundacion Medinaceli
- Casa de Feria

Government offices
Preceded by Bernardino de Cárdenas y Portugal	Viceroy of Catalonia; 1596–1602	Succeeded by Joan Terès i Borrull
Preceded by Jorge de Cárdenas y Manrique	Viceroy of Sicily; 1602–1606	Succeeded by Giovanni III Ventimiglia
Spanish nobility
Preceded by Gómez Suárez de Figueroa	Duke of Feria; 1571–1607	Succeeded by Gómez Suárez de Figueroa
