= Hospital del Cardenal Salazar =

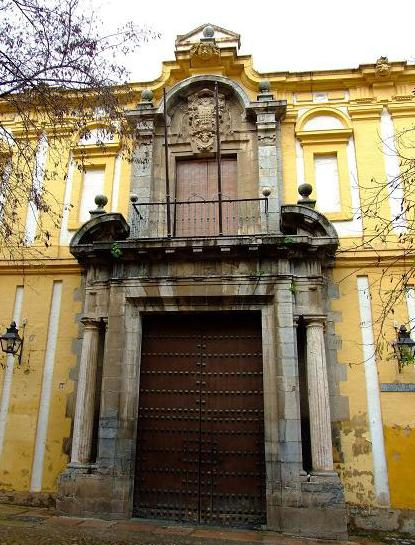
Faculty of Philosophy and Arts

Hospital del Cardenal Salazar (originally, Hospital General del Cardenal; currently, Facultad de Filosofía y Letras) was a general hospital located in Córdoba, Spain. It was founded in 1703 in the historic centre by Cardinal Pedro de Salazar Gutiérrez de Toledo, Bishop of Cordoba. The building was designed by Juan Antonio Camacho de Saavedra. It has great architectural beauty, with a facade of columns with Doric capitals flanking the arched entrance. The rooms surrounded patios that brought them light and air. It has served as a school, a hospital for the terminally ill, and is currently home to the University of Cordoba's Faculty of Philosophy and Arts.
