= Nicolás Fernández de Córdoba, 10th Duke of Medinaceli =

Spanish noble

The Most Excellent The Duke of Medinaceli GE
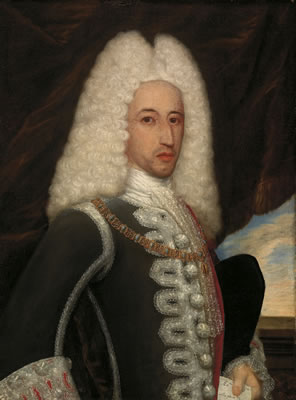
- Portrait by Valero Iriarte, 1729
- Born: 24 June 1682; Madrid, Spain
- Died: 19 March 1739 (aged 56); Madrid, Spain
- Occupation: Aristocrat

Nicolás Fernández de Córdoba y de la Cerda, 10th Duke of Medinaceli, GE (24 June 1682 – 19 March 1739) was a Spanish aristocrat. He was the 10th Duke of Medinaceli, an Ambassador of the King of Spain, Majordomo and Stable master of the queen, and a knight of the Order of the Golden Fleece.

== Family ==
Nicolás Fernández de Córdoba y de la Cerda was born in Madrid on 24 June 1682. He was the second son of Luis Mauricio Fernández de Córdoba y Figueroa (1650–90), 7th Marquis of Priego and 7th Duke of Feria. His mother was Feliche de la Cerda y Aragón (1657–1709), sister of the 9th Duke of Medinaceli, Luis Francisco de la Cerda (1660–1711). His uncle was the last male descendant of the second line of the Cerda house, descendants of Prince Ferdinand de la Cerda (1255–75), first son of King Alfonso X of Castile (1221–84). His older brother was Manuel Luis (1679–1700), 8th Marquis of Priego and 8th Duke of Feria, whom he succeeded in 1700. His other siblings were María Francisca (1677–99), María de la Encarnación (1696–1746), who married Vicente Álvarez de Toledo y Portugal, 10th Count of Oropesa, and Luis María (1708–1717).

== Career ==
Before the death of his older brother, Nicolás served as the page (Note: His position was "menino bracero", one who gives his arm to the queen.) of Queen Maria Anna of Neuburg (1667–1740), second wife of Charles II of Spain (1661–1700), and then served as the gentleman of the chamber of Philip V of Spain (1683–1746). He participated in the Battle of Cádiz (1702) and in the defense of El Puerto de Santa María.

In 1711 Nicolás succeeded his uncle Luis Francisco de la Cerda y Aragón, 9th Duke of Medinaceli, who had died without issue. He ordered the transfer to Madrid of the library created by Antonio de la Cerda, 7th Duke of Medinaceli (1607–71) in El Puerto de Santa María, which consisted of 1,474 works according to an inventory of 1673, and of the Seville library of what today is called the Casa de Pilatos, in order to create a centralized library. However, the collection was later sold to the friars of San Martin de Madrid by the Duchess of Cardona (possibly his wife).

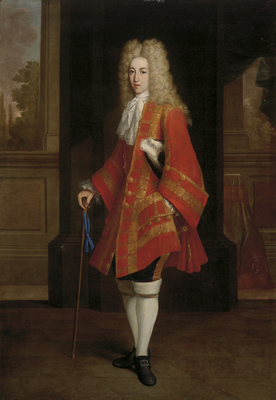
The Duke of Medinaceli as a young man

At the start of 1714, the King chose the palace of the Duke of Medinaceli to retire after the death of his first wife. The king appointed Nicolás as an Ambassador Extraordinary in charge of taking jewels to the intended new Queen Elisabeth Farnese (1692–1766) in Parma and receiving her in the king's name. He served as the queen's Majordomo and Stable master. By Royal Decree of 10 January 1724 he was honored with the Collar of the Fleece, which was given to him by King Louis I of Spain (1707–24). (Note: Philip V abdicated in favor of his son Louis on 14 January 1724, then resumed the throne when his son died on 6 September 1724.)

Nicolás Fernández de Córdoba endowed many of his estates with churches, chapels and oratories. On 7 May 1727 he gave a license for the establishment of the Capuchin Order in El Puerto de Santa María. He ordered construction of the granaries of Montilla and Aguilar de la Frontera. The Montilla granary is dated in 1722 and was designed by the Cordoban architect Juan Antonio Camacho de Saavedra. The same architect may have designed the Tercia de Aguilar for Nicolás, sometimes called the Tercia del Duque, which stands on the site of a previous building. He died in Madrid on 19 March 1739, and was buried at the Monastery of Santa María de Huerta in the Province of Soria.

== Marriage ==
On 30 September 1703 he married his first cousin, Jerónima María Spínola y de la Cerda (1687–1757), in the San Sebastian Church, Madrid. His wife was the daughter of Carlos Felipe Spínola y Colonna, Marquis of Los Balbases and Duke of Sexto, and of Isabel María de la Cerda y Aragón, daughter of Juan Francisco de la Cerda, 8th Duke of Medinaceli. Their children were:

- Luis Antonio (1704–68), 11th Duke of Medinaceli, who married María Teresa de Moncada y Benavides, 7th Marquesa de Aytona (1707–56)
- María Feliche (1705–48), who married José María de Guzmán Vélez de Ladrón de Guevara y Tassis, 12th Count of Oñate (died 1781)
- Felipe Antonio (1708–17)
- Teresa Francisca (1713–57), who married Antonio Álvarez de Toledo y Pérez de Guzmán, Marquis of Molina, 10th Marquis of Villafranca del Bierzo (1716–73)
- Joaquín (1715–17)
- Nicolasa (born 1719)
- Juan de Mata (1723–77), who married Mariana Sarmiento de Sotomayor, 6th Condesa de Salvatierra (1725–70)
- Buenaventura Fernández de Córdoba Spínola (1724–77), Cardinal and Patriarch of the West Indies

== Sources ==
- Larios de la Rosa, Juan; Albendea Solís, Juan (2003), "Nicolás Fernández de Córdoba y de la Cerda", in F. Fernández de Bethencourt (ed.), Historia Genealógica y Heráldica de la Monarquía Española. Casa Real y Grandes de España, vol. VI, Sevilla: Fabiola de Publicaciones Hispalenses, pp. 212–219
- Maestre Ballesteros, Antonio, Hechos y personajes en la historia de Aguilar (3) : Nicolás Fernández de Córdoba y la Cerda (in Spanish)
- Nicolás Fernández de Córdoba y de la Cerda (in Spanish), Fundación Casa Ducal de Medinaceli
- Nicolás Fernández de Córdoba y de la Cerda, IX Marqués de Priego (1682-1739) (in Spanish), Biblioteca de la Universidad Complutense de Madrid
