= Gómez Suárez de Figueroa, 3rd Duke of Feria =

Spanish nobleman

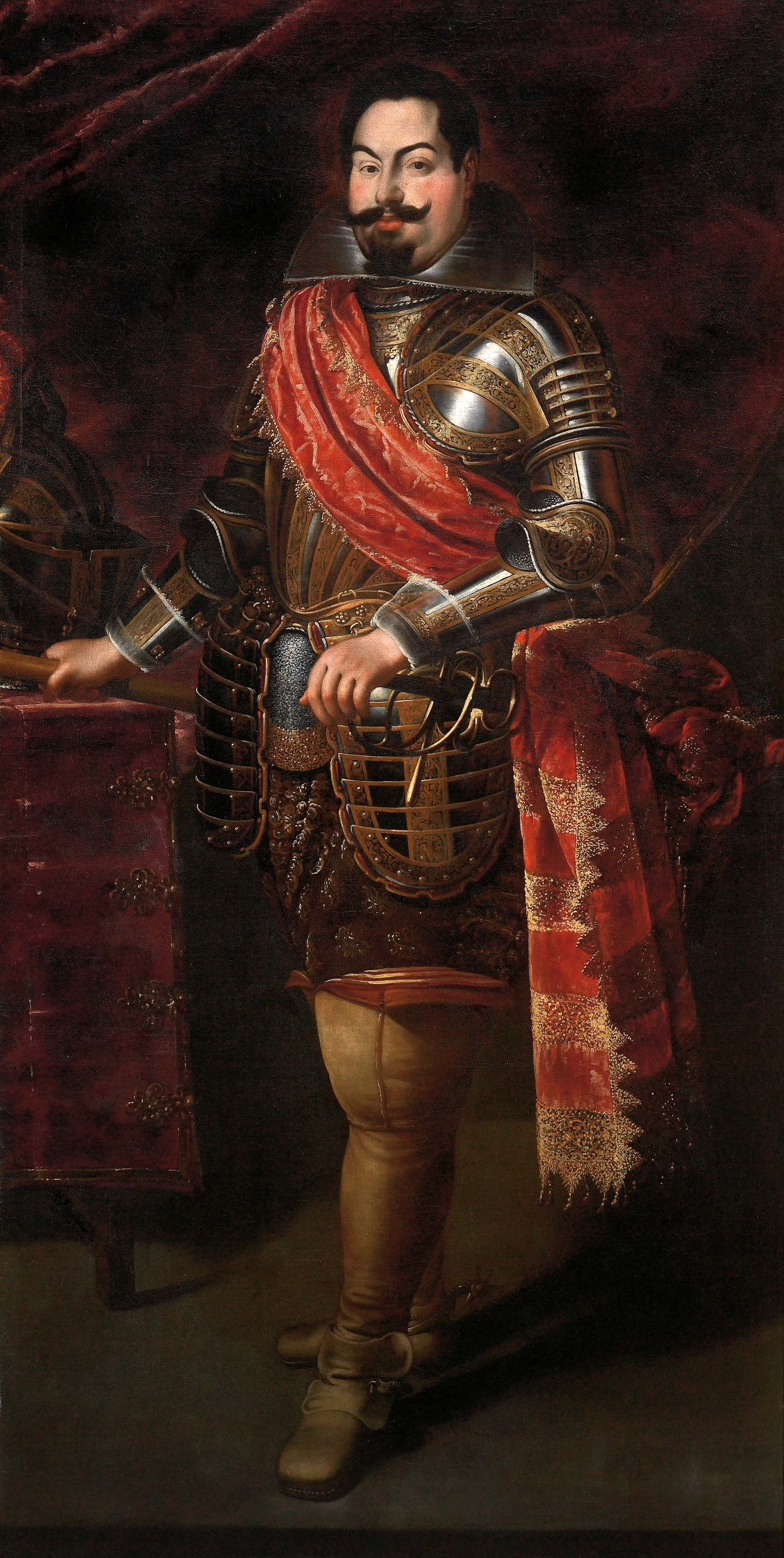
A portrait of the Duke of Feria

Gómez Suárez de Figueroa y Córdoba, 3rd Duke of Feria (1 September 1587 – 12 January 1634) was a Spanish nobleman, diplomat and army commander during the 17th century.

He was the son of Lorenzo Suárez de Figueroa y Córdoba, who he succeeded in 1607 as third Duke of Feria and second Marquis of Villalba (1604–1634). His mother was his father's third wife.

Don Gómez was known as the Gran Duque de Feria for his military skills. He can be considered as one of the last able military commanders of the Spanish Empire. He was also Viceroy of Valencia, Viceroy of Catalonia, Governor of Milan, state councillor, and special ambassador to Rome and France. While leading the Army of Alsace, he died in 1634 in Munich from typhoid.

He first married Francisca Cardona y Córdoba, whose three daughters all died very young. Later, he married Ana Fernández de Córdoba y Figueroa, who had two sons, Gaspar Lorenzo Suárez de Figueroa y Córdoba (1629–1634) and Baltasar, and a daughter, Maria. He became the fourth Duke of Feria and third Marquis of Villalba (1634), after the death of his father. Gaspar died that same year at the age of five, and the title went to the boy's maternal grandfather, the Marquis of Priego.

Government offices
Preceded by The Marquis of Caracena	Viceroy of Valencia; 1615–1618	Succeeded by The Marquis of Tavara
Preceded by The Marquis of Villafranca	Governor of the Duchy of Milan; 1618–1625	Succeeded by Gonzalo Fernández de Córdoba
Preceded by The Bishop of Solsona	Viceroy of Catalonia; 1629–1630	Succeeded by Enrique de Aragón
Preceded by The Marquis of Santa Cruz	Governor of the Duchy of Milan; 1631–1633	Succeeded by The Cardinal-Infante
Spanish nobility
Preceded by Lorenzo Suárez de Figueroa	Duke of Feria; 1607–1634	Succeeded by Gaspar Suárez de Figueroa
Preceded by Lorenzo Suárez de Figueroa	Marquis of Villalba; 1604–1634	Succeeded by Gaspar Suárez de Figueroa
