= Gómez Suárez de Figueroa y Córdoba, 1st Duke of Feria =

Spanish nobleman and diplomat

Gómez Suárez de Figueroa y Córdoba
- Duke of Feria
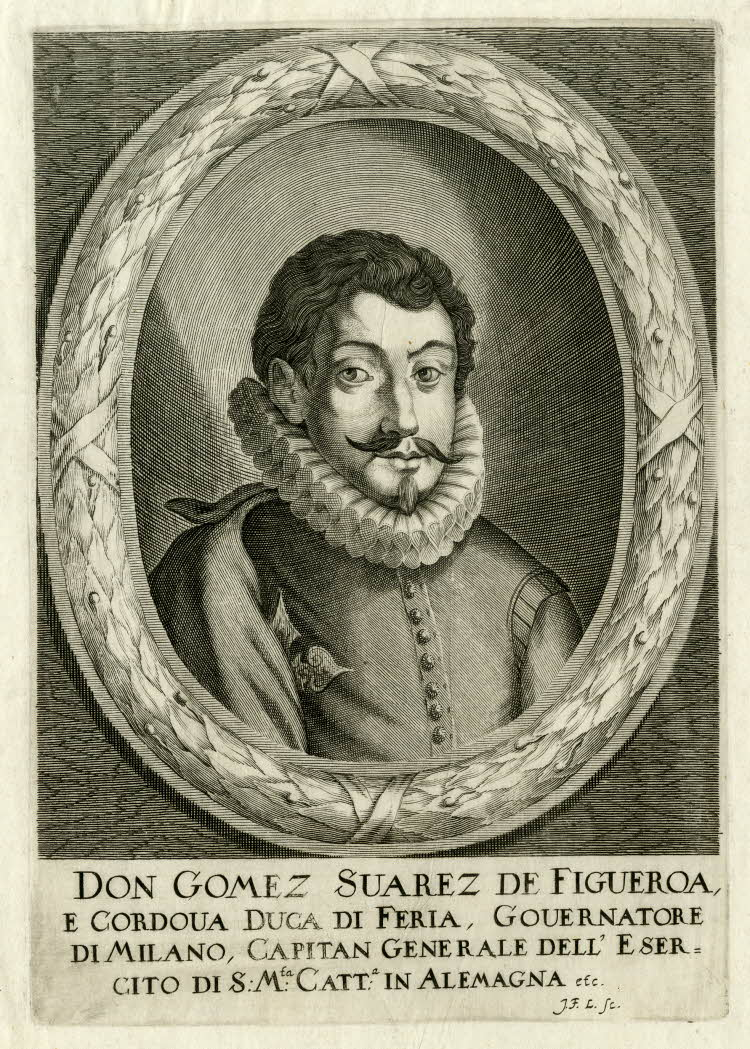
- Engraving of the Duke of Feria
- Born: Gómez Suárez de Figueroa y Córdoba c. 1520; Zafra, Extremadura
- Died: 1571 (aged 50–51)
- Buried: Convent of Santa Clara, Zafra
- Spouse: Jane Dormer (m. 1558)
- Issue: Lorenzo Suárez de Figueroa y Córdoba; Gomez Suárez de Figueroa y Córdoba
- Father: Lorenzo Suárez de Figueroa, 3rd Count of Feria
- Mother: Catalina Fernandez de Córdoba, Marchioness of Priego

Gómez Suárez de Figueroa y Córdoba, 1st Duke of Feria (c. 1520–1571) was a Spanish nobleman and diplomat, and close advisor of Philip II of Spain.

He served as Governor of Milan, at the time part of the Spanish Empire, and was also Captain General of the Spanish Armies in Germany.

== Early life ==
Probably born in Zafra, Extremadura, he was the second son of Lorenzo Suárez de Figueroa, 3rd Count of Feria, and his wife, Catalina Fernandez de Córdoba, Marchioness of Priego.

== Career ==
In 1551, he became 5th Count of Feria upon the death of his elder brother Pedro, and in 1554, he travelled with Philip of Spain to England for the King's marriage to Queen Mary I. He served as Captain of the King's Guard, and was regarded as only second to Ruy Gómez in the king's confidence. He went on to fight against the rebellion in the Low Countries, at the Battle of St Quentin.

After Elizabeth I's accession, he served as Philip's ambassador until he was succeeded by Bishop Álvaro de la Quadra, in May 1559.

In 1567, Philip II elevated his County to a Dukedom when he was created the 1st Duke of Feria. Feria returned to Spain where he served the King as royal chamberlain.

== Personal life ==
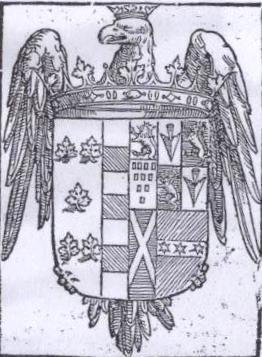
Arms of the 1st Duke of Feria.

On 29 December 1558, Feria married Mary I's former maid-of-honour, Lady Jane Dormer, a match resisted by both their families. Feria and his wife maintained a strong interest in the protection of English Catholic exiles; the former ambassador also supported the Ridolfi Plot of 1571. The couple had two children:

- Lorenzo Suárez de Figueroa y Córdoba (1559–1607), who served as ambassador to the Low Countries and viceroy of Naples.
- Don Gomez Suárez de Figueroa y Córdoba, who predeceased his father.

After Feria's death in 1571, he was buried in Zafra, in the Convent of Santa Clara. He was succeeded by his elder, and only surviving, son Lorenzo Suárez de Figueroa y Córdoba, who served as ambassador to the Low Countries and viceroy of Naples.
