= Duke of Feria =

Ancient duchy of Spain

Dukedom of Feria
- Creation date: 28 November 1567
- Created by: Philip II
- Peerage: Peerage of Spain
- First holder: Gómez Suárez de Figueroa y Córdoba, 1st Duke of Feria
- Present holder: Rafael de Medina y Abascal, 20th Duke of Feria

Duke of Feria (Spanish: Duque de Feria) is a hereditary title in the Peerage of Spain accompanied by the dignity of Grandee, granted in 1567 by Philip II to Gómez Suárez de Figueroa, 5th Count of Feria.

The name makes reference to the town of Feria in Badajoz.

== Counts of Feria ==
	Holder	Period
Created by Henry IV of Castile
I	Lorenzo II Suárez de Figueroa	1460–1461
II	Gómez II Suárez de Figueroa	1461–1506
III	Lorenzo III Suárez de Figueroa	1506–1528
IV	Pedro I Fernández de Córdoba y Figueroa	1528-1552
V	Gómez III Suárez de Figueroa y Córdoba	1552-1567
Raised to Duchy by Felipe II

== Dukes of Feria ==
1. Gómez Suárez de Figueroa y Córdoba, 1st Duke of Feria (1567–1571)
2. Lorenzo Suárez de Figueroa y Dormer, 2nd Duke of Feria (1571–1607)
3. Gómez Suárez de Figueroa y Mendoza, 3rd Duke of Feria (1607–1634)
4. Lorenzo Gaspar Suárez de Figueroa y Fernández de Córdoba, 4th Duke of Feria (1634)
5. Alonso Fernández de Córdoba y Enríquez de Ribera, 5th Duke of Feria (1637–1645)
6. Luis Ignacio Fernández de Córdoba y Fernández de Córdoba, 6th Duke of Feria (1645–1665)
7. Luis Mauricio Fernández de Córdoba y Fernández de Córdoba, 7th Duke of Feria (1665–1690)
8. Manuel Fernández de Córdoba y de la Cerda, 8th Duke of Feria (1690–1700)
9. Nicolás Fernández de Córdoba y de la Cerda, 9th Duke of Feria (1700–1739)
10. Luis Antonio Fernández de Córdoba y Spínola, 10th Duke of Feria (1739–1768)
11. Pedro de Alcántara Fernández de Córdoba y Moncada, 11th Duke of Feria (1768–1789)
12. Luis María Fernández de Córdoba y Moncada, 12th Duke of Feria (1789–1806)
13. Luis Joaquín Fernández de Córdoba y Benavides, 13th Duke of Feria (1806–1840)
14. Luis Tomás Fernández de Córdoba y Ponce de León, 14th Duke of Feria
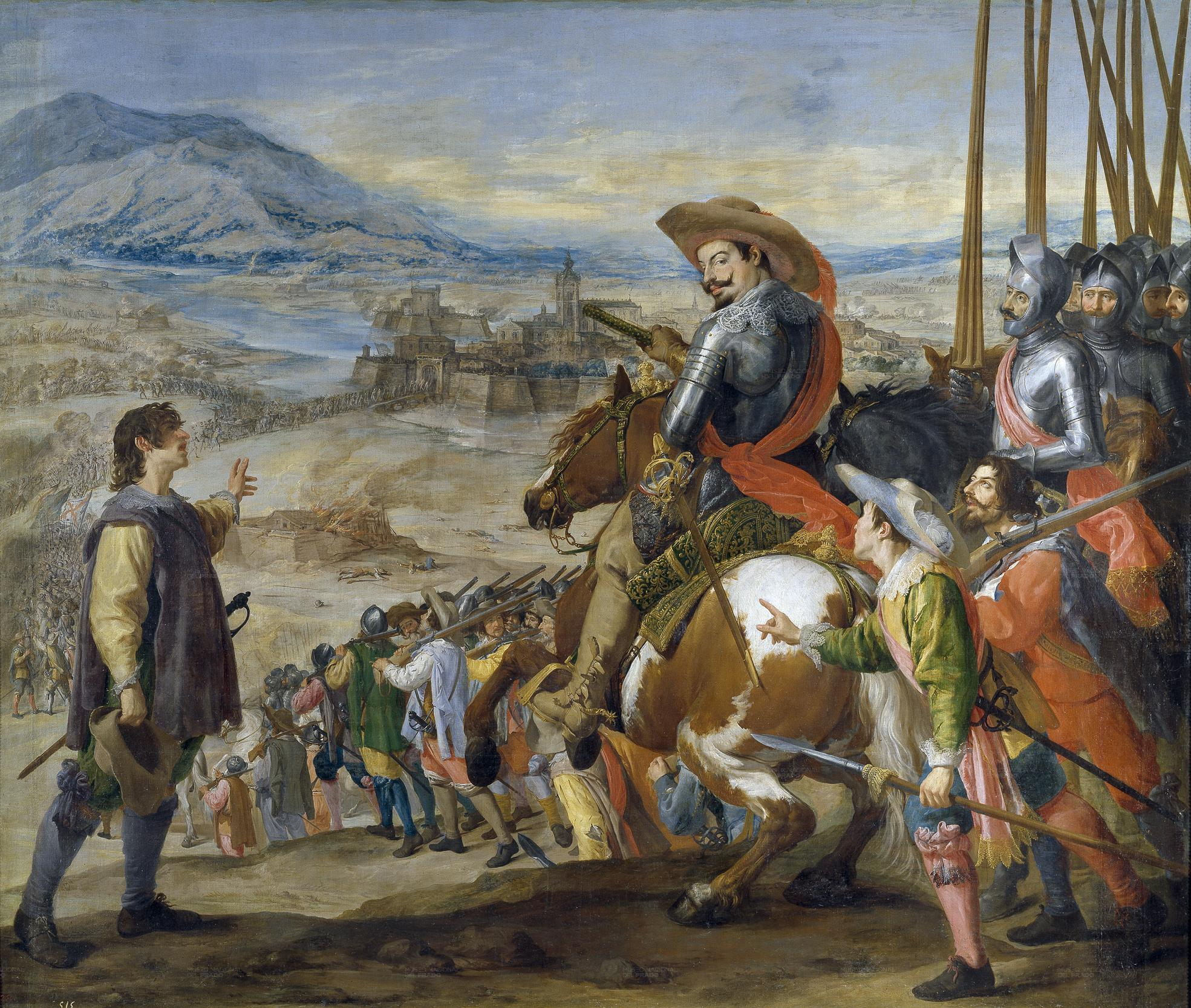
  The 3rd Duke of Feria leading the conquest of Breisach by Jusepe Leonardo, 1635
  (1840-1847 and 1854–1873)
15. Antonio Fernández de Córdoba y Ponce de León, 15th Duke of Feria (1847–1853)
16. Luis María Fernández de Córdoba y Pérez de Barradas, 16th Duke of Feria (1873–1879)
17. Luis Fernández de Córdoba y Salabert, 17th Duke of Feria (1880–1956)
18. Victoria Eugenia Fernández de Córdoba y Fernández de Henestrosa, 18th Duchess of Feria (1956–1969)
19. Rafael de Medina y Fernández de Córdoba, 19th Duke of Feria (1969–2001)
20. Rafael de Medina y Abascal, 20th Duke of Feria (2002)

== See also ==
- List of dukes in the peerage of Spain
- List of current grandees of Spain
