= Carcabuey =

- Municipality
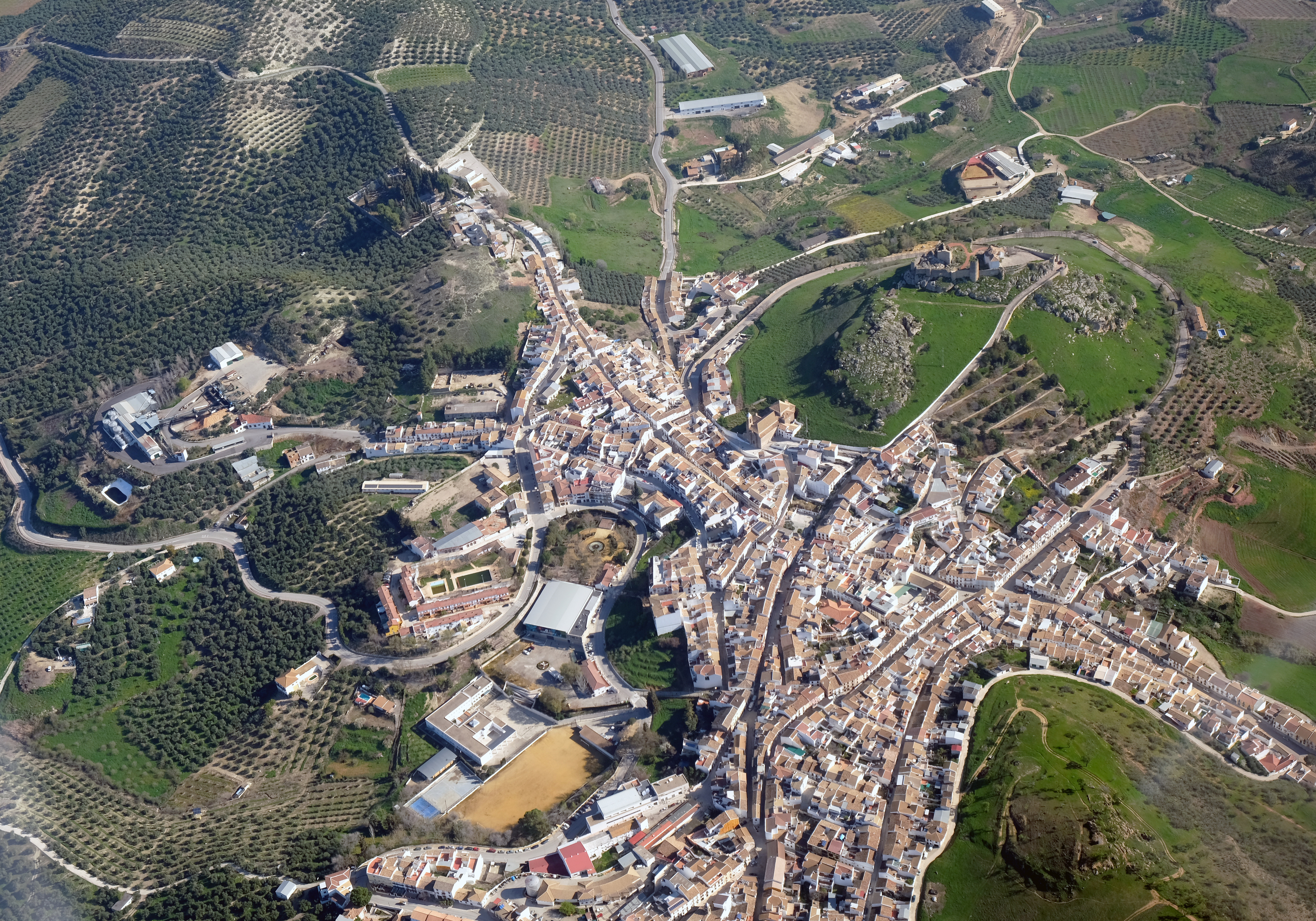
- Aerial view of Carcabuey.

- Seal
- Interactive map of Carcabuey
- Coordinates: 37°26′N 4°16′W
- Country: Spain
- Province: Córdoba
- Municipality: Carcabuey

Area
  - Total: 80 km^{2} (31 sq mi)
- Elevation: 642 m (2,106 ft)

Population (2025-01-01)
  - Total: 2,302
  - Density: 29/km^{2} (75/sq mi)
- Time zone: UTC+1 (CET)
  - Summer (DST): UTC+2 (CEST)

Carcabuey is a municipality located in the province of Córdoba, Spain. According to the 2006 census (INE), the city has a population of 2,775 inhabitants.

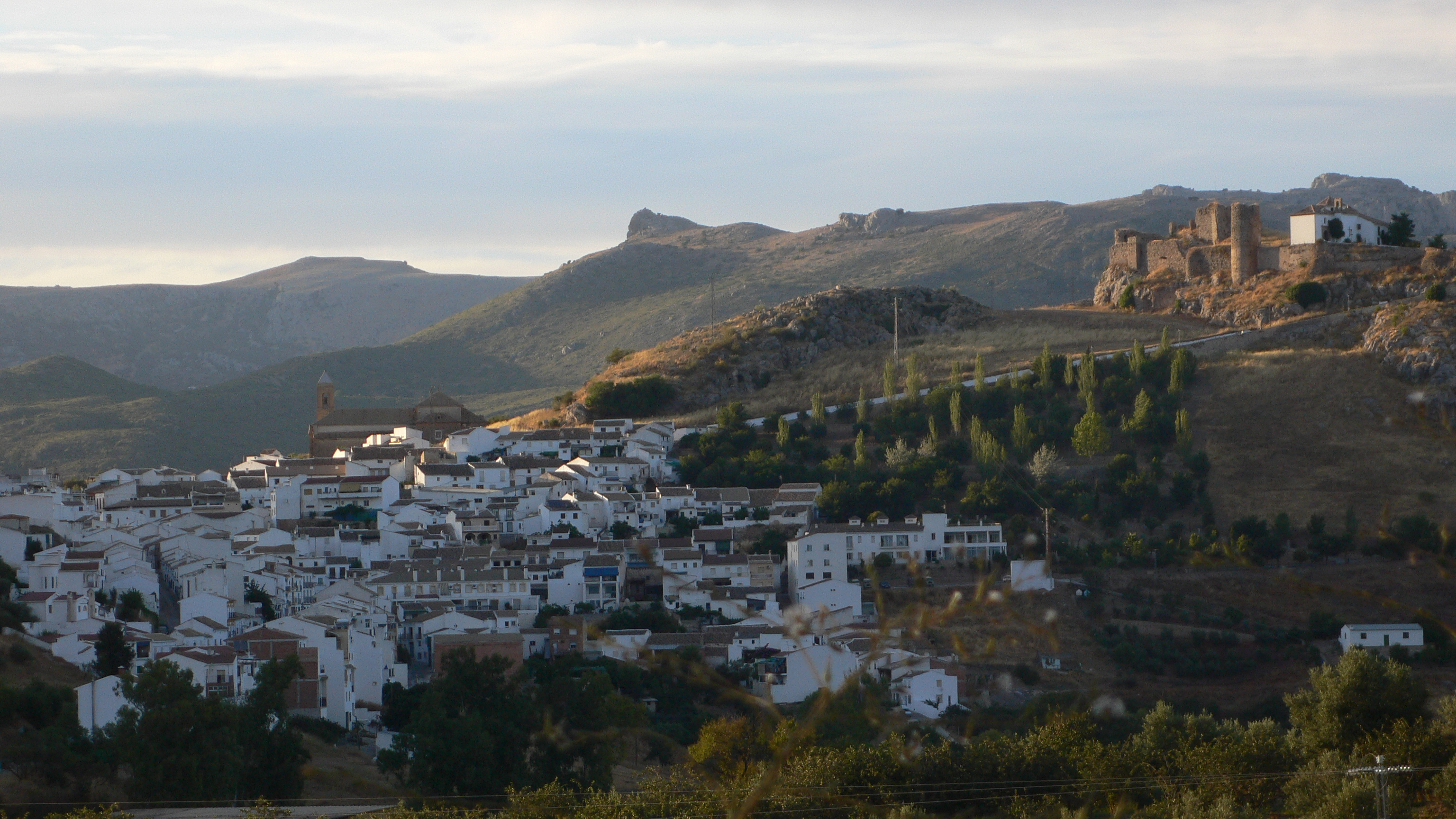
Panoramic view of Carcabuey, Cordoba, Spain

== See also ==
- List of municipalities in Córdoba
