= Olías del Rey =

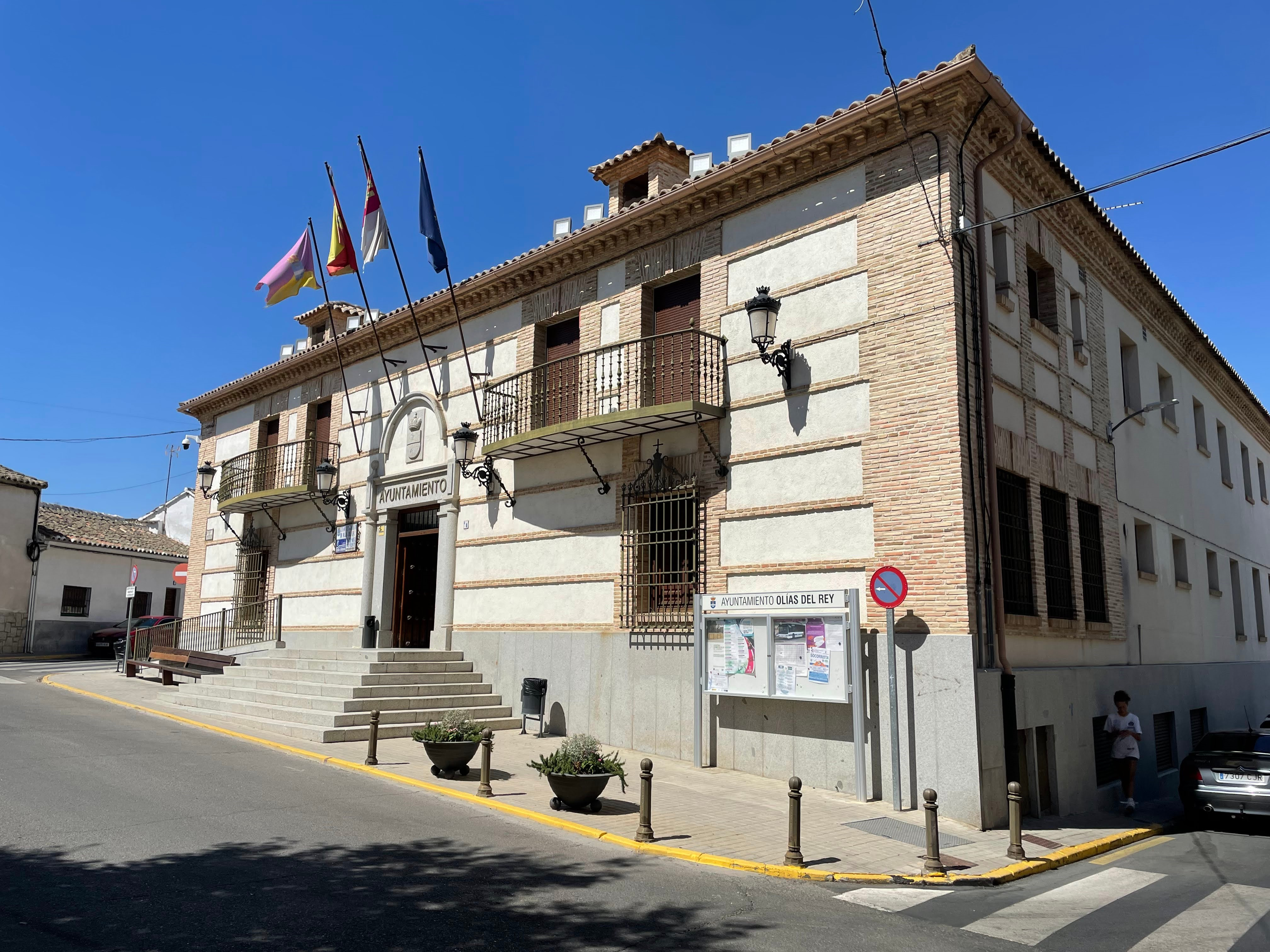
- Town hall

- Flag Coat of arms

- Location in Spain.
- Coordinates: 39°56′36″N 03°59′16″W
- Country: Spain
- Autonomous community: Castile-La Mancha
- Province: Toledo
- Comarca: La Sagra

Government
  - Mayor: Luis Miguel Hernández Martínez

Area
  - Total: 39.94 km^{2} (15.42 sq mi)
- Elevation: 588 m (1,929 ft)

Population (2025-01-01)
  - Total: 9,174
  - Density: 229.7/km^{2} (594.9/sq mi)
- Demonym(s): Olieros, Olieños
- Time zone: UTC+1 (CET)
  - Summer (DST): UTC+2 (CEST)
- Postal code: 45280
- Website: Official website

Olías del Rey is a municipality located in the province of Toledo, Castile-La Mancha, Spain. As of 2009, the municipality has a population of 6656 inhabitants.
