= Rafael de Medina, 20th Duke of Feria =

Spanish nobleman and businessman

The Most Excellent The Duke of Feria GE
- Tenure: 2002 - present
- Other titles: Marquess of Villalba (GE)
- Born: July 25, 1978 (age 47); Madrid, Spain
- Spouse: Laura Vecino de Acha
- Issue: Rafael de Medina y Vecino; Laura de Medina y Vecino (twins)
- Parents: Rafael de Medina y Fernández de Córdoba, 19th Duke of Feria; Natividad Abascal y Romero Toro

Rafael de Medina y Abascal, 20th Duke of Feria, GE (Spanish pronunciation: [rafaˈel de meˈðinaj aβaˈskal]) (born 25 September 1978) is a Spanish nobleman and businessman. He is the son of the late 19th Duke of Feria and the Spanish top-model Naty Abascal. He belongs to one of the most important families of Spain, the House of Medinaceli, being a grandson of Victoria Eugenia Fernández de Córdoba, 18th Duchess of Medinaceli.

== Background ==
Rafael studied Finance in Washington and in New York. He subsequently worked for the company Credit Suisse. In 2002, he succeeded his father to the dukedom of Feria at the age of 23, therefore becoming one of the youngest dukes in the Spanish nobility. In 2007 he gave up his job to launch a project named Scalpers, a fashion line for men. Rafael is a celebrated member of the Spanish aristocracy and jet-set, entering the Vanity Fair's International Best Dressed List in 2007. He currently resides in Madrid.

== Wedding ==
The Duke married Laura Vecino de Acha on 16 October 2010.

== Ancestry ==
Ancestors of Rafael de Medina, 20th Duke of Feria

16. Francisco de Asís de Medina, 3rd Marquis of Esquivel
8. Luis de Medina y Garvey
17. María Dolores Garvey y Capdepont
4. Rafael de Medina y Vilallonga
18. José de Vilallonga y Gipuló
9. Amelia de Vilallonga e Ybarra
19. Rafaela María de Ybarra y Arámbarri
2. Rafael de Medina, 19th Duke of Feria
20. Luis María Fernández de Córdoba, 16th Duke of Medinaceli
10. Luis Fernández de Córdoba, 17th Duke of Medinaceli
21. Casilda Remigia de Salabert, 9th Marquise of la Torrecilla
5. Victoria Eugenia Fernández de Córdoba, 18th Duchess of Medinaceli
22. Ignacio Fernández de Henestrosa, 8th Count of Moriana del Río
11. Ana María Fernández de Henestrosa y Gayoso de los Cobos
23. Francisca de Borja Gayoso de los Cobos, 15th Marquise of Camarasa
1. Rafael de Medina, 20th Duke of Feria
12. Francisco Abascal y Cobo
6. Domingo Abascal y Fernández
13. Dominica Fernández y García de la Villa
3. Natividad Abascal y Romero-Toro
28. Antonio Romero-Toro, 2nd Marquis of Romero-Toro
14. Joaquín Romero-Toro, 3rd Marquis of Romero-Toro
29. Ana de Ochoa y Eguíluz
7. Natividad Romero-Toro y Noriega
30. Florencio Noriega y Noriega
15. Natividad Noriega y de la Borbolla
31. Natividad de la Borbolla y Arpide

== Titles and styles ==
=== Titles ===
- 20th Duke of Feria, Grandee of Spain
- 17th Marquess of Villalba

=== Styles ===
- The Most Excellent Don Rafael de Medina y Abascal (1978 - 2002)
- The Most Excellent The Duke of Feria (2002 -)

== Notes ==
Spanish nobility
Preceded by Rafael de Medina	Duke of Feria; 2002–present	Incumbent
