= Luis Fernández de Córdoba y Spínola =

Spanish aristocrat

Luis Antonio Fernández de Córdoba y Spínola (Madrid, 20 September 1704 - Madrid, 14 January 1768), 11th Duke of Medinaceli, 10th Duke of Feria, 9th Duke of Alcalá de los Gazules, 11th Duke of Segorbe, 12th Duke of Cardona and 10th Count of Santa Gadea, was a Spanish aristocrat who served the Royal Spanish House.

== Early life ==
He was the eldest son of Nicolás Fernández de Córdoba, 10th Duke of Medinaceli and Jerónima María Spínola y de la Cerda.

== Career ==
In addition to his many titles, he was Lieutenant General of the Royal Armies and Captain of the Royal Guard Company of the King.

In 1747, he was sent by King Ferdinand VI of Spain to Naples as Extraordinary ambassador, to act as godfather on behalf of the King, of the newborn Infante Felipe Pascual, son of the King of Naples and Sicily. For this, he received the collar of the Golden Fleece.

The King appointed him in 1749 Caballerizo mayor, a position he would hold under the new King Charles III of Spain, until the end of his life. In 1766 he tried, without success, to mediate in the Esquilache Riots.

== Personal life ==
On 19 November 1722 he was married to María Teresa de Moncada and Benavides (1707-1756). After the death of her father in 1727, she became the 7th Duchess of Camiña, 7th Marchioness of Aytona, 5th Marchioness of la Puebla de Castro, and 11th Countess of Medellín. Together, they had one son and three daughters:

- Pedro de Alcántara Fernández de Córdoba y Montcada (1730-1789), his successor
- María del Rosario de Córdoba y Montcada(1732-1773), who married Francisco Ponce de León y Spínola, 10th Duke of Arcos.
- Ana María de la O de Córdoba y Montcada (1738-1782), who married Antonio de Benavides y de la Cueva, 2nd Duke of Santisteban del Puerto.
- María Dolores de Córdoba y Montcada (1746-1770)

After the death of his first wife in 1756, he remarried with María Francisca Pignatelli de Aragón y Gonzaga (1747-1769), daughter of Joaquín Pignatelli, Count of Fuentes, in 1763. They had no children.
