= Army of Alsace (1633) =

The Army of Alsace was a field army raised by the Spanish Empire in 1633 during the Thirty Years' War for the purposes of recovering Alsace and defending the Rhineland and the County of Burgundy.

The idea for an army of Alsace originated with the Duke of Feria in November 1632, when he received a request from Isabella Clara Eugenia, the governor of the Habsburg Netherlands, to provide for the defence of the County of Burgundy. Already charged with protecting the Milan–Flanders route for the planned march of the Cardinal-Infante Ferdinand of Austria, wrote to Madrid on 4 February 1633 proposing to raise an army of 15,000 men for service in Germany. This plan was approved, but the duke soon requested an enlargement to 20,000 infantry and 4,000 cavalry. This was approved on 27 March and orders went out on 8 April.

Diplomatically, it was necessary to secure the approval of Emperor Ferdinand III, Elector Maximilian I of Bavaria and General Albrecht von Wallenstein. On 5 July, with the army almost formed, the emperor, acting on Wallenstein's advice, refused to permit it to operate in Alsace. By mid-August, however, he had been persuaded by Spanish representatives, the Count of Oñate and Marquis of Castañeda, to change his mind and permit the army freedom of operation. The first task of the Army of Alsace would be the relief of besieged Breisach.

The Duke of Feria crossed the Alps into Germany with an army of 5,000 infantry and 1,300 cavalry on 5 September. Its financing was secured. On 20 October, it relieved Breisach. As it prepared to winter, it was struck by typhus. The Duke of Feria died of the disease on 11 February 1634. The army, which had reached a strength 20,000, was reduced to 4,000 and dissolved. It never entered Alsace.

== Works cited ==
- Elliott, J. H. (1986). The Count-Duke of Olivares: The Statesman in an Age of Decline. Yale University Press. ISBN 978-0-300-03390-8.
- Pike, John (2022). The Thirty Years War, 1618–1648: The First Global War and the End of the Habsburg Supremacy. Pen and Sword Military.
