= Monturque =

- Municipality
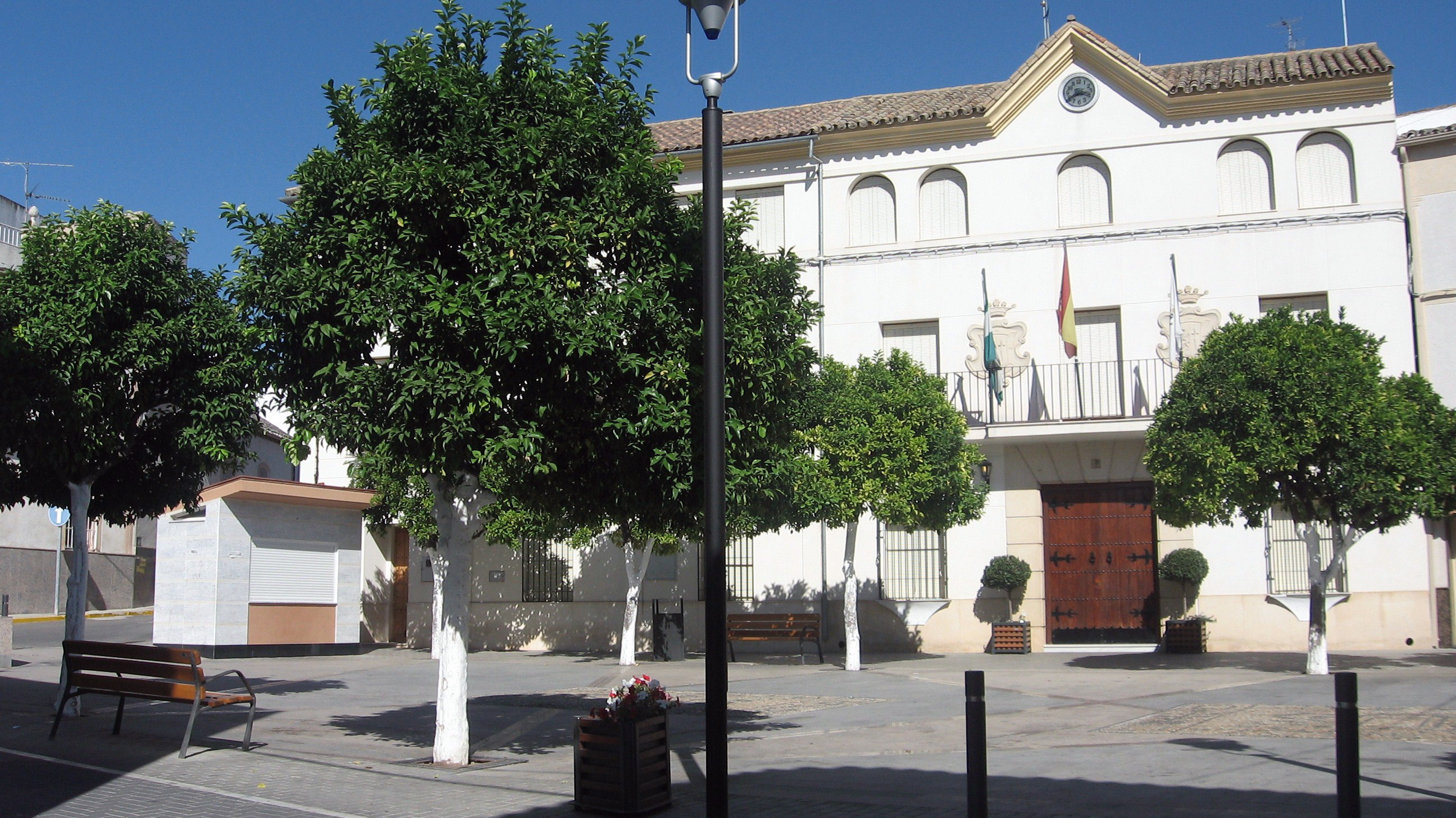
- Monturque Town Hall
- Flag Seal
- Location within Spain Location within Andalusia Location within Province of Córdoba (Spain)
- Coordinates: 37°28′N 4°34′W
- Country: Spain
- Province: Córdoba
- Municipality: Monturque

Area
  - Total: 33 km^{2} (13 sq mi)
- Elevation: 395 m (1,296 ft)

Population (2025-01-01)
  - Total: 1,929
  - Density: 58/km^{2} (150/sq mi)
- Time zone: UTC+1 (CET)
  - Summer (DST): UTC+2 (CEST)

Monturque is a municipality located in the province of Córdoba, Spain. According to the 2006 census (INE), the city has a population of 2001 inhabitants.

== See also ==
- List of municipalities in Córdoba
