= Marquess of Priego =

Hereditary noble title of the Kingdom of Spain

Marquessate of Priego
- Creation date: 9 December 1501
- Created by: Ferdinand II
- Peerage: Peerage of Spain
- First holder: Pedro Fernández de Córdoba y Pacheco, 1st Marquess of Priego
- Present holder: Victoria Elisabeth Hohenlohe-Langenburg y Schmidt-Polex

Marquess of Priego (Spanish: marqués de Priego) is a hereditary noble title of the Kingdom of Spain that Ferdinand the Catholic granted on 9 December 1501 to Pedro Fernández de Córdoba y Pacheco, 7th Lord of Aguilar in Córdoba, of the house of Córdoba. It is one of the most important noble titles in Spain, and was made a first class grandee in 1520 by Charles V, Holy Roman Emperor.

The name comes from the Andalusian municipality of Priego de Córdoba in the province of Córdoba.

The Marquessate of Montalbán belongs to the same noble house, and both titles today are held by the House of Medinaceli.

== List of title holders ==
| | Title holder | Period |
Creation of the lordship by Henry II of Castile in 1370
| I. | Gonzalo Fernández de Córdoba y Ruiz de Biedma | 1370-1384 |
| II. | Alfonso Fernández de Córdoba y García | 1384-1424 |
| III. | Pedro Fernández de Córdoba y Venegas | 1424-1447 |
| IV. | Alfonso Fernández de Córdoba y Arellano | 1441-1441 |
| V. | Pedro Fernández de Córdoba y Arellano | 1441-1455 |
| VI. | Alfonso Fernández de Córdoba | 1455-1501 |
| VII. | Pedro Fernández de Córdoba y Pacheco | 1501-1517 |
Elevation to marquessate by Ferdinand II of Aragon and Isabella I of Castile in 1501
| I | Pedro Fernández de Córdoba y Pacheco | 1501–1517 |
| II | Catalina Fernández de Córdoba y Enríquez | 1517–1569 |
| III | Catalina Fernández de Córdoba y Ponce de León | 1569–1574 |
| IV | Pedro Fernández de Córdoba y Figueroa | 1574–1606 |
| V | Alonso Fernández de Córdoba y Enríquez de Ribera | 1606–1645 |
| VI | Luis Ignacio Fernández de Córdoba y Enríquez de Ribera | 1645–1665 |
| VII | Luis Fernández de Córdoba y Fernández de Córdoba | 1665–1690 |
| VIII | Manuel Fernández de Córdoba y de la Cerda | 1690–1700 |
| IX | Nicolás Fernández de Córdoba y de la Cerda | 1700–1739 |
| X | Luis Fernández de Córdoba y Spínola | 1739–1768 |
| XI | Pedro de Alcántara Fernández de Córdoba y Moncada | 1768–1789 |
| XII | Luis Fernández de Córdoba y Gonzaga | 1789–1806 |
| XIII | Luis Fernández de Córdoba y Benavides | 1806–1840 |
| XIV | Luis Fernández de Córdoba y Ponce de León | 1840–1873 |
| XV | Luis Fernández de Córdoba y Pérez de Barradas | 1873–1879 |
| XVI | Luis Fernández de Córdoba y Salabert | 1880–1956 |
| XVII | Victoria Eugenia Fernández de Córdoba y Fernández de Henestrosa | to 2013 |
| XVIII | Victoria Elisabeth von Hohenlohe-Langenburg | 2018–present |

== Marquesses ==
- Pedro Fernández de Córdoba y Pacheco (died 24 January 1517), I Marquess of Priego, Alguacil mayor of Córdoba, married Elvira Enríquez. Succeeded by his daughter.
- Catalina Fernández de Córdoba y Enríquez (died 13 July 1569), II Marchioness of Priego. Married 15 August 1518 to Lorenzo Suárez de Figueroa, III Count of Feria. She was succeeded by her granddaughter, daughter of Pedro Fernández de Córdoba y Figueroa and Ana de la Cruz Ponce de León, daughter of Rodrigo Ponce de León y Ponce de León, I Duke of Arcos.
- Catalina Fernández de Córdoba y Ponce de León, III Marchioness of Priego (died 28 September 1574), married on 8 January 1560 to her uncle, Alfonso Fernández de Córdoba y Figueroa, also called Alonso de Aguilar, I Marquess of Villafranca. Succeeded by her son.
- Pedro Fernández de Córdoba y Figueroa (died 24 August 1606), IV Marquess of Priego, married on 22 July 1587 to Juana Enríquez de Ribera (died 7 November 1635). Succeeded by his son.
- Alonso Fernández de Córdoba y Enríquez de Ribera (died 24 July 1645), V Marquess of Priego and V Duke of Feria. married his first cousin, Juana Enríquez de Ribera, daughter of Fernando Enríquez de Ribera y de Ana Téllez-Girón. Succeeded by his son;
- Luis Ignacio Fernández de Córdoba y Figueroa (died 26 August 1665), VI Marquess of Priego and VI Duke of Feria. Married Mariana Fernández de Córdoba. Succeeded by his son;
- Luis Mauricio Fernández de Córdoba y Figueroa (died 23 August 1690), VII Marquess of Priego and VII Duke of Feria. married Feliche María de la Cerda y Aragón, daughter of Juan Francisco de la Cerda, IX Duke of Medinaceli and of Catalina de Aragón y Sandoval, VIII Duchess of Segorbe and IX Duchess of Cardona. Succeeded by his son.
- Manuel Luis Fernández de Córdoba Figueroa (died 11 June 1799), VIII Marquess of Priego and VIII Duke of Feria. Single and without children. succeeded by his brother.
- Nicolás Fernández de Córdoba y de la Cerda (died 19 March 1739), IX Marquess of Priego, IX Duke of Feria, X Duke of Medinaceli, etc. married on 30 September 1703 to his first cousin, Jerónima María Spínola y de la Cerda. Succeeded by his son.
- Luis Fernández de Córdoba y Spínola (died 13 January 1768), X Marquess of Priego, X Duke of Feria, XI Duke of Medinaceli, IX Duke of Alcalá de los Gazules, XI Duke of Segorbe and XII Duke of Cardona. Married 19 November 1722 to María Teresa de Moncada y Benavides, VII Duchess of Camiña, VII Marchioness of Aytona], V Marchioness of Puebla de Castro and XI Countess of Medellín. Succeeded by his son.
- Pedro de Alcántara Fernández de Córdoba y Moncada (died 24 November 1789), XI Marques of Priego, XII Duke of Medinaceli, Duke of Feria, etc. Married twice, first to María Francisca Gonzaga di Castiglione, daughter of I Duke of Solferino, and second to María Petronila Pimentel. Succeeded by a son of the first marriage.
- Luis María Fernández de Córdoba y Gonzaga (died 12 November 1806), XII Marquess of Priego, XIII Duke of Medinaceli, etc. Succeeded by his son.
- Luis Joaquín Fernández de Córdoba y Benavides (died (7 July 1840), XIII Marquess of Priego, XIV Duke of Medinaceli, etc. Succeeded by his son.
- Luis Tomás Fernández de Córdoba y Ponce de León (died 6 January 1873), XIV Marquess of Priego, XV Duke of Medinaceli, etc. married Ángela Pérez de Barradas y Bernuy, I Duchess of Denia y Tarifa. Succeeded by his son.
- Luis Fernández de Córdoba y Pérez de Barradas (died 14 May 1879), XV Marquess of Priego, XVI Duke of Medinaceli. First married María Luisa Fitz-James Stuart y Portocarrero, IX Duchess of Montoro, with no children. Second married Casilda de Salabert y Arteaga, VII Countess of Ofalia. Succeeded by his son.
- Luis Fernández de Córdoba y Salabert (16 January 1880 – 13 July 1956), XVI Marquess of Priego, XVII Duke of Medinaceli, etc. First married in 1911 to Ana María Fernández de Henestrosa y Gayoso de los Cobos, and second married María de la Concepción Rey de Pablo Blanco. Succeeded by his daughter of the first marriage;
- Victoria Eugenia Fernández de Córdoba, 18th Duchess of Medinaceli (Madrid, 16 April 1917 – Sevilla, 18 August 2013), XVII Marchioness of Priego, XVIII Duchess of Medinaceli, Married Rafael de Medina y Vilallonga. Succeeded by her granddaughter, daughter of Ana Luisa de Medina y Fernández de Córdoba y de Prince Marco of Hohenlohe-Langenburg, 19th Duke of Medinaceli;
- Princess Victoria of Hohenlohe-Langenburg, 20th Duchess of Medinaceli (born Málaga, 17 March 1997), XVIII Marchioness of Priego, XIX Duchess of Medinaceli and other titles.
